= New York State Route 20SY =

Former highway in New York

New York State Route 20SY
- Map of the Syracuse area with NY 20SY highlighted in red

Route information
- Auxiliary route of US 20
- Maintained by New York Department of Public Works
- Length: 38.13 mi (61.36 km)
- Existed: 1951–1961

Major junctions
- West end: US 20 / NY 321 in Skaneateles
- US 11 in Syracuse
- East end: US 20 / NY 20N / NY 92 in Cazenovia

Location
- Country: United States
- State: New York
- Counties: Onondaga, Madison

Highway system
- New York Highways; Interstate; US; State; Reference; Parkways
← NY 20N	→ NY 21

New York State Route 20SY (NY 20SY) was a state highway in the vicinity of the city of Syracuse, New York, in the United States. It connected U.S. Route 20 (US 20) to downtown Syracuse via Skaneateles, Camillus, Manlius, and Cazenovia in Onondaga County and Madison County. The highway began at an intersection with US 20 and NY 321 in the village of Skaneateles and ended at a junction with US 20, NY 20N, and NY 92 near the village of Cazenovia. Most of NY 20SY overlapped another route; however, two sections of NY 20SY—one in the town of Camillus and another near the village of Fayetteville—were not concurrent with another highway.

NY 20SY was assigned in 1951, overlapping parts of the pre-existing NY 321, NY 5, NY 92, and NY 20N, a more southerly alternate route of US 20 in the Syracuse area. Both NY 20N and NY 20SY were removed in 1961. The two independent sections of NY 20SY near Camillus and Fayetteville eventually became part of NY 321 and NY 92, respectively.

== Route description ==
=== West of Syracuse ===
NY 20SY began at an intersection with US 20 (East Genesee Street) and NY 321 (State Street) in the village of Skaneateles. The route proceeded northward, overlapping NY 321 through the lakeside village and into the surrounding town of Skaneateles, where it became State Street Road. Once in Skaneateles, the surroundings became mostly rural ahead of an intersection with the Old Seneca Turnpike. The highway continued on, turning to the northeast as the highway entered the town of Elbridge.

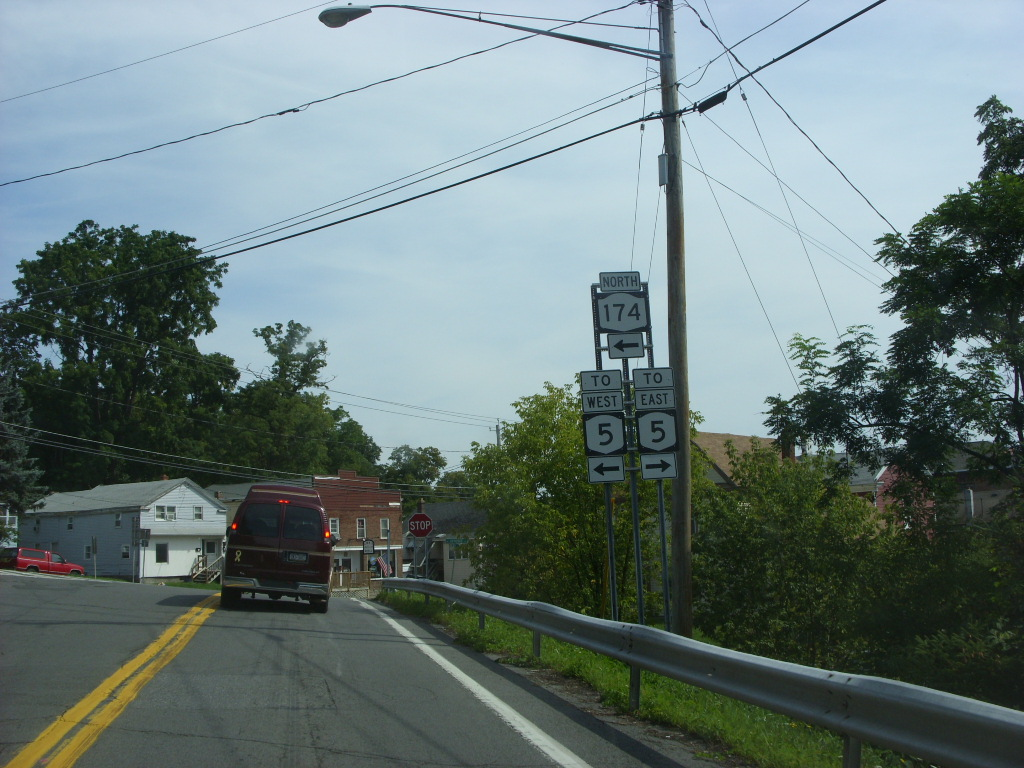
The former northern terminus of NY 174 and NY 321 at NY 5 and NY 20SY in Camillus as it appeared in 2008

In Elbridge, NY 20SY and NY 321 followed a more east–west routing as it passed through the town and intersected NY 368. The route progressed eastward, intersecting with Limeledge Road (County Route 236A or CR 236A) as it passed into the town of Camillus. Just east of the town line, NY 20SY and NY 321 split at an intersection with Forward Road, with NY 321 following Forward Road eastward and NY 20SY proceeding north on modern NY 321 to an intersection with NY 5 (West Genesee Street). NY 20SY turned eastward here, joining NY 5 as both highways headed toward the village of Camillus.

West of Camillus, NY 5 and NY 20SY passed to the north of the West Hill Golf and Croquet Club before veering to the southeast as the highway approached the village of Camillus and the edge of a valley surrounding Ninemile Creek that contains the village. Upon reaching the lip of the valley, NY 5 and NY 20SY descended northeastward into both the valley and the village. Here, NY 5 and NY 20SY met the northern terminus of NY 174 and NY 321 before exiting the valley and entering an area of Camillus known as Fairmount.

=== Syracuse ===
Routes 5 and 20SY proceeded eastward through the primarily residential neighborhood of Fairmount to an intersection with NY 173 (South Onondaga Road) in eastern Fairmount. The routes continued on, passing through the town of Geddes before entering the city of Syracuse. In Syracuse, the two routes followed West Genesee Street and West Erie Boulevard into the downtown district, where NY 5 and NY 20SY intersected NY 48 at the intersection of West Erie Boulevard and West Genesee Street and US 11 at the junction of Erie Boulevard and State Street.

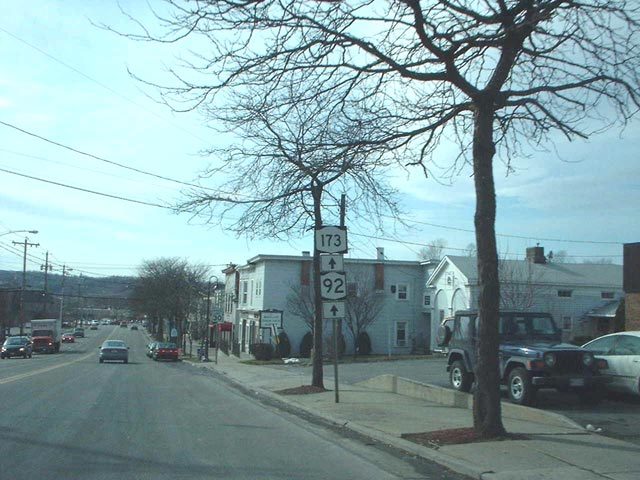
Signage along the NY 92 / NY 173 overlap in Manlius. This overlap included NY 20N and NY 20SY during the 1950s and early 1960s

East of State, NY 20SY continued to follow NY 5 through the eastern part of Syracuse. The two routes met the southern terminus of NY 433 at Midler Avenue before passing north of LeMoyne College and exiting the city of Syracuse. Upon crossing into the town of DeWitt, Routes 5 and 20SY curved southward toward the hamlet of DeWitt, situated at the junction of NY 5 and NY 92. Both NY 5 and NY 20SY turned east onto NY 92, joining the route for just over 1 mile (1.6 km) to the vicinity of Fayetteville. While NY 5 and NY 92 continued east into Fayetteville, NY 20SY turned southeast onto High Bridge Road.

=== East of Syracuse ===
The High Bridge Road portion of NY 20SY largely served as a southwestern bypass of Fayetteville. NY 20SY proceeded southeast from NY 5 and NY 92, crossing into the town of Manlius and passing over Limestone Creek at a point known as High Bridge. Just northwest of the village of Manlius, NY 20SY intersected NY 92 at what is now the junction of NY 92 and NY 257. The two routes converged once more, following Fayette Street into the village of Manlius. In the village center, NY 20SY and NY 92 intersected Seneca Street, which carried the overlapping routes of NY 20N and NY 173. NY 20SY and NY 92 joined NY 20N and NY 173 here, creating a four-route overlap that lasted for two blocks through the village's business district to the junction of Washington and Seneca Streets. Here, NY 173 split from the overlap, following Seneca Street (the old Seneca Turnpike) eastward while the other three highways veered southeast onto Washington Street.

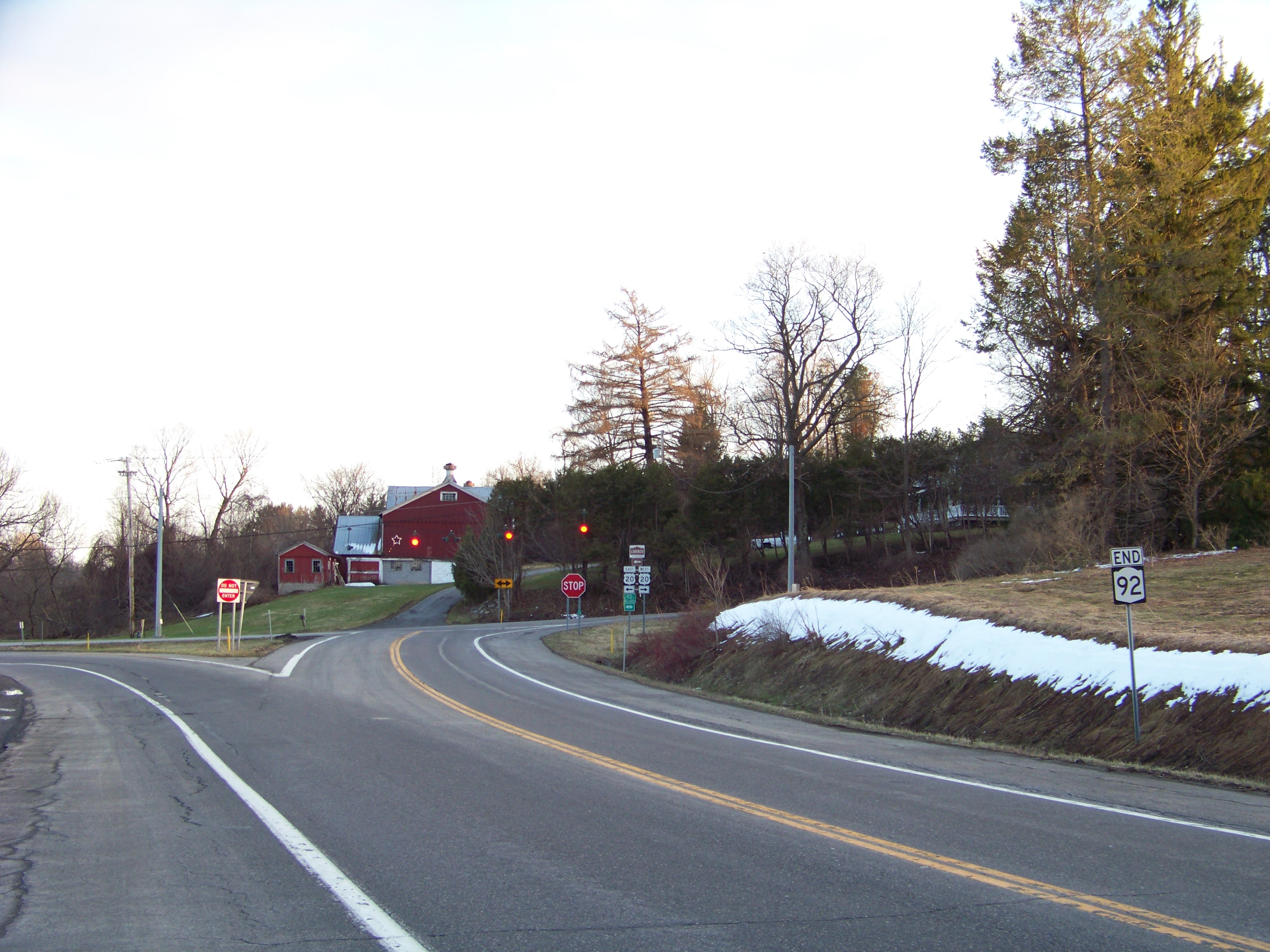
The eastern terminus of NY 92 in Cazenovia. This also served as the eastern terminus of NY 20SY and NY 20N

NY 20N, NY 20SY, and NY 92 exited the village, paralleling Limestone Creek as the highway headed southeastward through rural portions of the towns of Manlius and Pompey. As Cazenovia Road, the route served Buellville and Oran, two small creekside hamlets in the town of Pompey. Roughly 4 miles (6.4 km) southeast of Manlius, Limestone Creek and the three-route overlap split, with the creek proceeding south through a valley known as Pompey Hollow and the highway continuing into Madison County and the town of Cazenovia within.

In Cazenovia, the road became known as Syracuse Road and began to follow a more southerly alignment as it turned ahead of Cazenovia Lake. NY 20N, NY 20SY, and NY 92 gradually approached the lake and ultimately followed the western lakeshore as the roadway approached the village of Cazenovia. The three routes never actually reached the village, however, as all three designations ended at an intersection with US 20 (the Cherry Valley Turnpike) 0.25 miles (0.40 km) west of the village limits and 1 mile (1.6 km) west of the village center.

== History ==
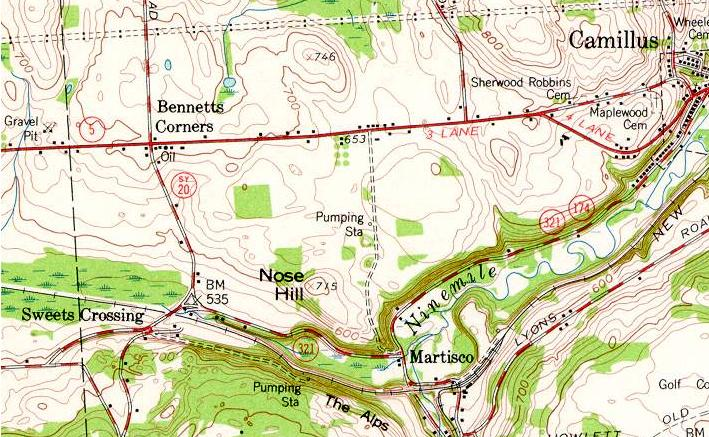
1957 United States Geological Survey topographic map of Camillus, showing one of NY 20SY's two independent segments

NY 20SY was assigned in 1951 as an alternate route of US 20 in the Syracuse area. While US 20 bypassed the city of Syracuse to the south, NY 20SY veered north to serve Downtown Syracuse and the eastern and western suburbs of the city. It was the second alternate route of US 20 near Syracuse; the first, NY 20N, was also a northern alternate route of US 20 but it followed a more southerly routing than NY 20SY. Most of NY 20SY was concurrent to other, pre-existing state highways in the Syracuse area, namely NY 321, NY 5, NY 92, NY 173, and NY 20N. NY 5 was assigned in 1924; NY 92, NY 173, and NY 321 were assigned as part of the 1930 renumbering of state highways in New York; and NY 20N was assigned c. 1938.

While most of NY 20SY was concurrent with at least one other state highway, there were two segments where NY 20SY followed an independent routing. One was in the town of Camillus, where NY 20SY followed a previously unnumbered highway between NY 321 and NY 5; the other was southwest of the village of Fayetteville, where NY 20SY used a previously unnumbered highway to bypass the village while NY 92 passed through it.

When NY 20SY was first assigned, it entered downtown Syracuse on NY 5 and followed NY 5 and US 11 through downtown before leaving the area on NY 92. It was realigned by 1954 to follow only NY 5 through downtown. The route left its original alignment at the junction of US 11 and NY 5 in downtown Syracuse and rejoined it at the western terminus of the NY 5 / NY 92 overlap in DeWitt.

Both NY 20N and NY 20SY were removed in 1961. The independent section of NY 20SY that bypassed Fayetteville became a realignment of NY 92 upon the removal of NY 20SY. The other independent section in Camillus became a realignment of NY 321 in the late 1980s.

== Major intersections ==
County	Location	mi	km	Destinations	Notes
Onondaga	Village of Skaneateles	0.00	0.00	US 20 / NY 321	Southern terminus of NY 321; southern terminus of NY 20SY / NY 321 overlap
Onondaga	Town of Elbridge	6.01	9.67	NY 368	Now CR 107; southern terminus of NY 368
Onondaga	Town of Camillus	7.64	12.30	NY 321 north	Northern terminus of NY 20SY / NY 321 overlap
Onondaga	Town of Camillus	8.45	13.60	NY 5 west	Hamlet of Bennetts Corners; western terminus of NY 5 / NY 20SY overlap
Onondaga	Village of Camillus	10.65	17.14	NY 174	Northern terminus of NY 174
Onondaga	Town of Camillus	15.18	24.43	NY 173	
Onondaga	Syracuse	18.22	29.32	NY 48	Southern terminus of NY 48
Onondaga	Syracuse	20.04	32.25	US 11	
Onondaga	Syracuse			NY 433	Now NY 598; southern terminus of NY 433
Onondaga	DeWitt	25.21	40.57	NY 92 west	Western terminus of NY 20SY / NY 92 overlap
Onondaga	DeWitt	26.34	42.39	NY 5 east / NY 92 east	Eastern terminus of NY 5 / NY 20SY and NY 20SY / NY 92 overlaps
Onondaga	Village of Manlius	29.80	47.96	NY 92 west	Now NY 257; western terminus of NY 92 / NY 20SY overlap
Onondaga	Village of Manlius	30.20	48.60	NY 20N west / NY 173 west	Western terminus of NY 20N / NY 20SY and NY 20SY / NY 173 overlaps
Onondaga	Village of Manlius	30.36	48.86	NY 173 east	Eastern terminus of NY 20SY / NY 173 overlap
Madison	Town of Cazenovia	38.13	61.36	US 20 / NY 20N / NY 92	Eastern terminus of NY 20N and NY 92; eastern terminus of NY 20N / NY 20SY and NY 20SY / NY 92 overlaps
1.000 mi = 1.609 km; 1.000 km = 0.621 mi: Concurrency terminus
