= New York State Route 20N =

Former state highway in central New York in the United States

New York State Route 20N
- Map of the Syracuse area with NY 20N highlighted in red

Route information
- Auxiliary route of US 20
- Maintained by New York Department of Public Works
- Length: 30.76 mi (49.50 km)
- Existed: May 1937–1961

Major junctions
- West end: US 20 / NY 174 in Marcellus town
- NY 174 / NY 175 in Marcellus village; US 11 in Syracuse; NY 20SY / NY 92 / NY 173 in Manlius
- East end: US 20 / NY 20SY / NY 92 in Cazenovia

Location
- Country: United States
- State: New York
- Counties: Onondaga, Madison

Highway system
- New York Highways; Interstate; US; State; Reference; Parkways
← NY 20D	→ NY 20SY

New York State Route 20N (NY 20N) was a state highway in central New York in the United States. It was an alternate route of U.S. Route 20 (US 20) that stretched for 30.5 miles (49.1 km) between Marcellus and Cazenovia. The road began at its parent route, US 20, and NY 174 in Marcellus and ended at US 20, NY 20SY, and NY 92 in Cazenovia. All of NY 20N was concurrent with at least one other route, namely NY 174 in Marcellus, NY 175 from Marcellus to Onondaga Hill, NY 173 from Onondaga Hill to Manlius, and NY 92 and NY 20SY between Manlius and Cazenovia. NY 20N was assigned in May 1937 and removed in 1961 along with NY 20SY.

== Route description ==
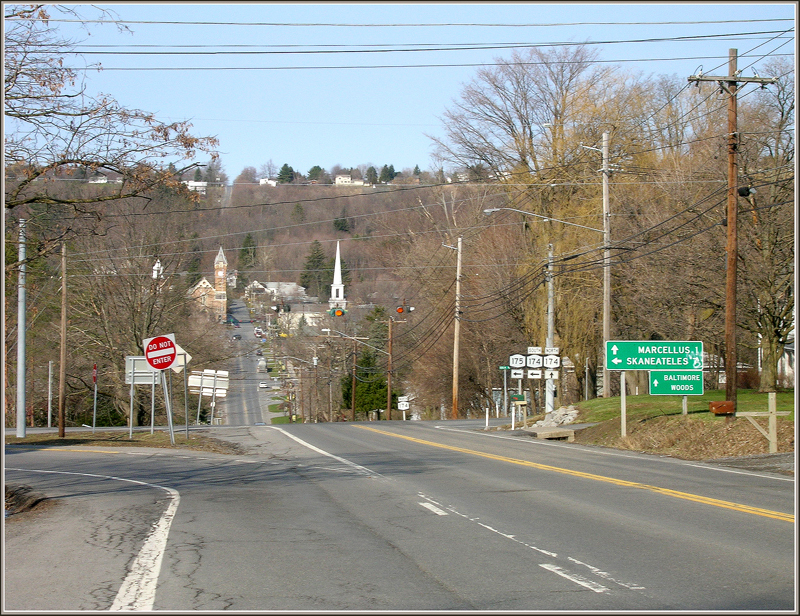
The modern intersection of NY 174 and NY 175 east of Marcellus, which NY 20N passed through

NY 20N began at an intersection with US 20 and NY 174 in the town of Marcellus. The route headed north, overlapping NY 174 through the town of Marcellus into the village of Marcellus. At the time, the two routes entered the village on South Street and followed it north to Main Street. NY 20N and NY 174 turned east, following Main for a half-block to North Street. Here, NY 20N and NY 174 split, with NY 174 heading to the west and NY 20N proceeding east along NY 175, which began at this junction at the time of NY 20N's removal.

NY 20N and NY 175 continued east to Onondaga, where NY 173 joined the two routes and created a three-route overlap for 100 yards (91 m). At the east end of the overlap, NY 20N continued east along NY 173 into the southernmost section of Syracuse. Here, the two routes intersected NY 80 and US 11 and passed under Interstate 81 before exiting the city limits.

Now in the town of De Witt, NY 20N and NY 173 met the northern terminus of NY 91 in the hamlet of Jamesville. The overlap between NY 20N and NY 173 ended 5 miles (8.0 km) to the east in the village of Manlius, where NY 92 and NY 20SY joined both routes just west of where NY 173 split from NY 20N and continued to the east. Outside of Manlius, NY 20N, NY 20SY and NY 92 headed southeast for 7 miles (11 km) to Cazenovia, where all three routes ended at US 20 adjacent to Cazenovia Lake and west of the village.

== History ==
The portion of NY 20N from the intersection of NY 174 and NY 175 in the village of Marcellus to the junction of NY 92 and NY 173 in Manlius was part of the Seneca Turnpike. The turnpike was created in the 1800s and at the time was the longest in the state.

The establishment of an alternate route to U.S. Route 20, which bypassed Syracuse to the south, began in 1933. Local restaurants, hotels and gas stations, along with the Syracuse Chamber of Commerce all demanded a route bearing the "20" number on it. This new route would be designated NY 20N, to be established in 1938. The route extended from the town of Marcellus to the village of Cazenovia and overlapped NY 174, NY 175, NY 173, and NY 92 upon assignment. All four of the routes that NY 20N originally overlapped were assigned as part of the 1930 renumbering of state highways in New York.

A second, more northerly alternate route of US 20 in the Syracuse area was assigned in 1951 and designated as NY 20SY. From Manlius to Cazenovia, NY 20SY overlapped NY 20N and NY 92. Both NY 20N and NY 20SY were removed in 1961.

== Major intersections ==
County	Location	mi	km	Destinations	Notes
Onondaga	Town of Marcellus	0.00	0.00	US 20 / NY 174 south	Southern terminus of NY 20N / NY 174 overlap
Onondaga	Village of Marcellus	3.67	5.91	NY 174 north / NY 175	Northern terminus of NY 20N / NY 174 overlap; western terminus of NY 175; western terminus of NY 20N / NY 175 overlap
Onondaga	Onondaga	12.01	19.33	NY 173 west	Hamlet of Onondaga Hill; western terminus of NY 20N / NY 173 overlap
Onondaga	Onondaga	12.07	19.42	NY 175 east	Hamlet of Onondaga Hill; eastern terminus of NY 20N / NY 175 overlap
Onondaga	Syracuse	13.33	21.45	NY 80	
Onondaga	Syracuse	13.87	22.32	US 11	
Onondaga	DeWitt	17.87	28.76	NY 91	Hamlet of Jamesville; northern terminus of NY 91
Onondaga	Village of Manlius	22.83	36.74	NY 20SY west / NY 92 west	Western terminus of NY 20N / NY 20SY and NY 20N / NY 92 overlaps
Onondaga	Village of Manlius	22.99	37.00	NY 173 east	Eastern terminus of NY 20N / NY 173 overlap
Madison	Village of Cazenovia	30.76	49.50	US 20 / NY 20SY / NY 92	Eastern terminus of NY 20SY and NY 92; eastern terminus of NY 20N / NY 20SY and NY 20N / NY 92 overlaps
1.000 mi = 1.609 km; 1.000 km = 0.621 mi: Concurrency terminus
