= New York State Route 257 =

State highway in Onondaga County, New York, US

New York State Route 257
- Map of Onondaga County in central New York with NY 257 highlighted in red

Route information
- Maintained by NYSDOT
- Length: 3.82 mi (6.15 km)
- Existed: 1940s–present

Major junctions
- South end: NY 92 in Manlius village
- North end: NY 290 in Manlius town

Location
- Country: United States
- State: New York
- Counties: Onondaga

Highway system
- New York Highways; Interstate; US; State; Reference; Parkways
| ← NY 256 | → NY 258 |

New York State Route 257 (NY 257) is a state highway in eastern Onondaga County, New York, in the United States. It runs from a junction with NY 92 near the village of Manlius through downtown Fayetteville to an intersection with NY 290 at Manlius Center. The path of NY 257 has been state-maintained since 1918; however, the NY 257 designation only dates back to the 1940s, when it was assigned to the portion of its modern alignment north of Fayetteville. The remainder, originally part of NY 92, became part of NY 257 in the early 1960s.

== Route description ==
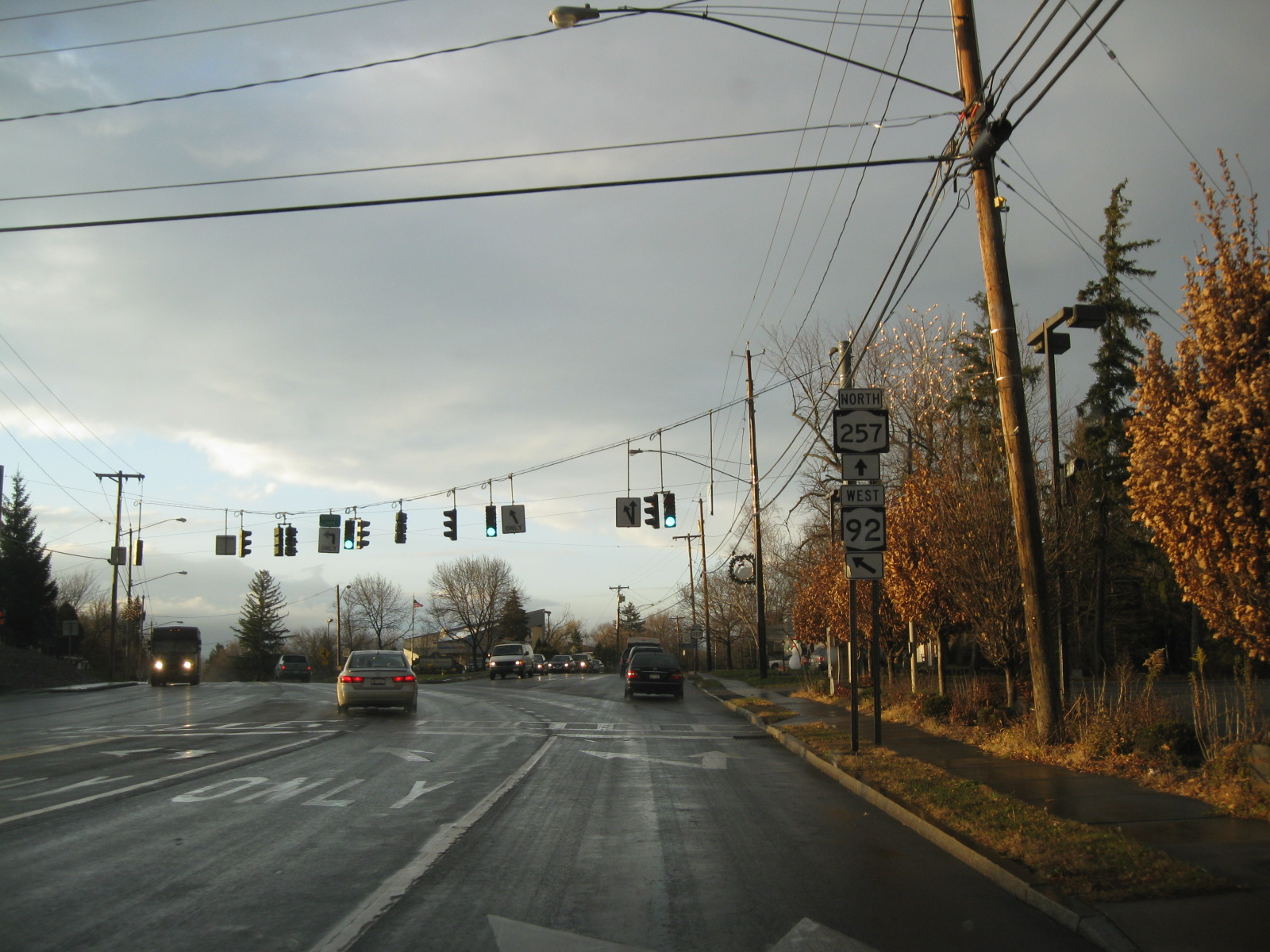
South end of NY 257 at NY 92 in Manlius

Route 257 begins at NY 92 in Manlius. Known as Fayetteville–Manlius Road, it proceeds northwest to Fayetteville, where it becomes South Manlius Street as it passes near the Fayetteville Cemetery. At an intersection with NY 5 in the center of the village, NY 257 becomes North Manlius Street. Just outside Fayetteville in the town of Manlius, it intersects County Route 56 and crosses a small stream before becoming North Manlius Road. From this point northward, NY 257 parallels an old alignment of the Erie Canal (as well as the surrounding Old Erie Canal State Park) to Manlius Center, where it ends at NY 290.

== History ==
All of what is now NY 257 was originally added to the state highway system on August 14, 1918, as part of State Highway 1073 (SH 1073), an unsigned legislative designation still used today for inventory purposes. In the 1930 renumbering of state highways in New York, the section of SH 1073 south of Fayetteville became part of NY 92. The portion of the route north of Fayetteville remained unnumbered until the 1940s when it was designated as NY 257. In the early 1950s, what is now NY 92 from DeWitt to Manlius was designated as part of NY 20SY. The NY 20SY designation was eliminated c. 1962, at which time NY 92 was realigned to bypass Fayetteville by way of NY 20SY's former routing southwest of the village. The former alignment of NY 92 between Fayetteville and Manlius became a southward extension of NY 257.

== Major intersections ==
The entire route is in Onondaga County.

| Location | mi | km | Destinations | Notes |
|---|---|---|---|---|
| Village of Manlius | 0.00 | 0.00 | NY 92 | Southern terminus |
| Fayetteville | 1.92 | 3.09 | NY 5 | |
| Town of Manlius | 3.82 | 6.15 | NY 290 – Minoa, East Syracuse | Northern terminus; hamlet of Manlius Center |
1.000 mi = 1.609 km; 1.000 km = 0.621 mi
