= Manlius Village Historic District =

Historic district in New York, United States

- U.S. National Register of Historic Places
- U.S. Historic district
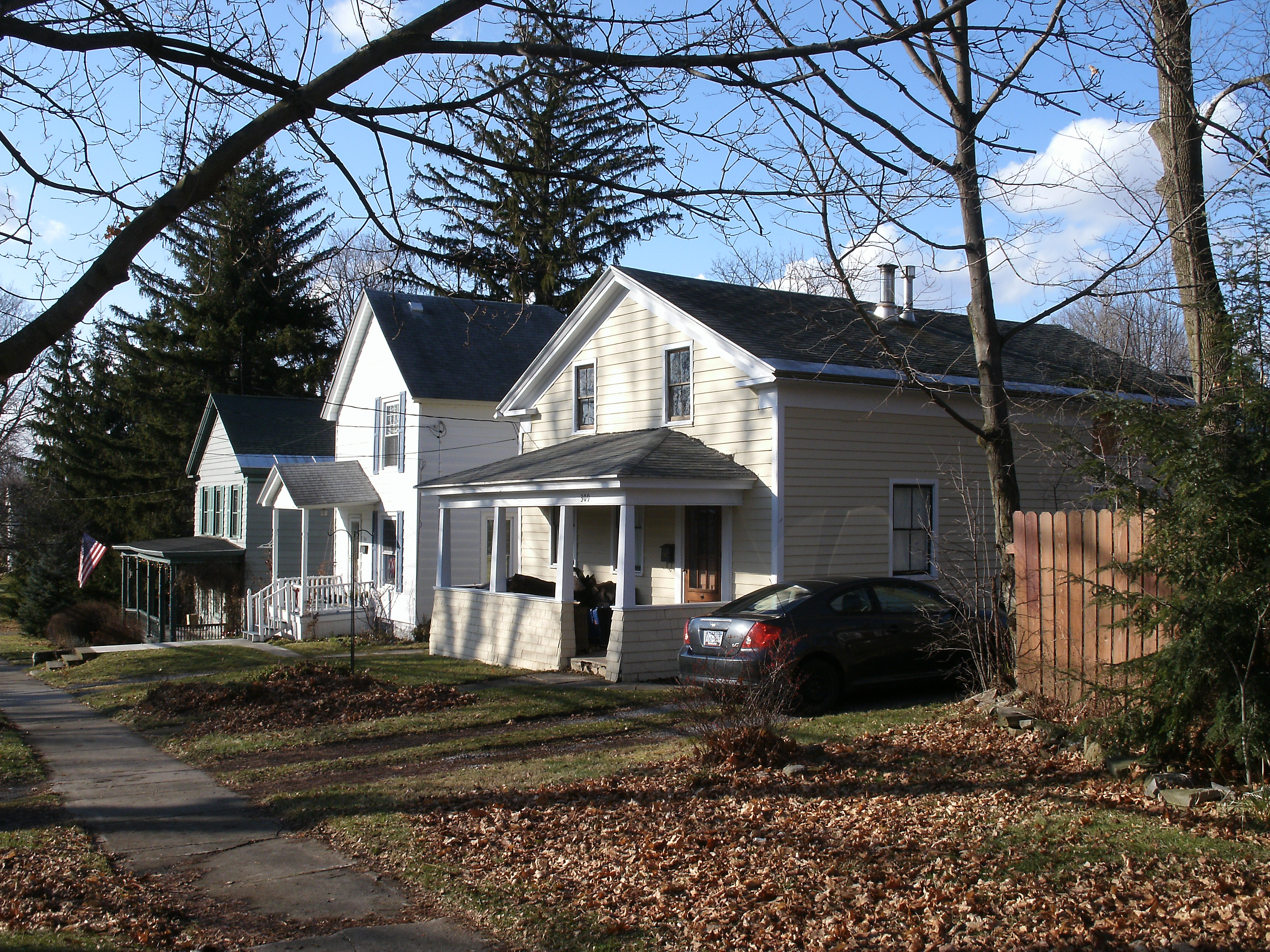
- 305, 307, and 309 Pleasant Street

- Location within New York Location within the United States
- Location: Pleasant, Franklin, North, Clinton, and E. Seneca Streets, Manlius, New York
- Coordinates: 43°0′11″N 75°58′31″W
- Area: 15 acres (6.1 ha)
- Built: 1813
- Architectural style: Greek Revival, Italianate
- NRHP reference No.: 73001232
- Added to NRHP: November 6, 1973

The Manlius Village Historic District is a 15-acre (6.1 ha) historic district on the east side of the Village of Manlius, in the Town of Manlius, New York, about 9.5 miles from the downtown of Syracuse.

The village was bypassed by later transportation—Genesee Street/Route 5, which took a flatter course to the north, the Erie Canal, which generated growth of Syracuse, railroads, and the NYS Thruway in the 1950s—and "thus retains much of the flavor of the turnpike era to which this small Onondaga County village owes its existence."

The historic district was listed on the National Register of Historic Places in 1973. The district includes four churches and one commercial block building on the western edge of the district. "The district does not include the downtown commercial area of Manlius because a number of fires, remodelings, and demolitions have infringed on its visual continuity." Most of the 50 contributing buildings in the district are single-family homes. Most of the buildings are on Seneca Street, part of the old Seneca Turnpike, or one block north on Pleasant Street.

The district, which comprises a three-block area, includes several buildings dating from approximately 1813, when the village of Manlius was incorporated, as well as buildings constructed later in the 19th century and a few 20th-century buildings. It includes Greek Revival and Italianate architectural styles.

The first wave of construction in the village was around its incorporation in 1813. The Christ Episcopal Church, Smith Hall, and other buildings that still survive in the district were built during that time. Smith Hall, built during 1813–16, was expanded in 1824 to include a third-floor meeting room for the Masons. The "lodge room still has murals depicting symbolic Masonic scenes; these are said to have been painted early in the nineteenth century by an itinerant painter by the name of Fish. The paintings were later covered by wallpaper and were rediscovered in 1902." The buildings at 105 North Street and 112 Franklin Street, both pictured, are residential examples of structures built during the first wave of construction and are also two of the five buildings in the district to be adorned with pilasters.

Greek Revival was a predominant architectural style in the second wave of building in the 1830s. 311 Pleasant Street, pictured, is an example of this style in a residential structure. Later construction included the gazebo in Academy Park on Seneca Street in the 1880s and First Baptist Church on North Street in 1929, both pictured.

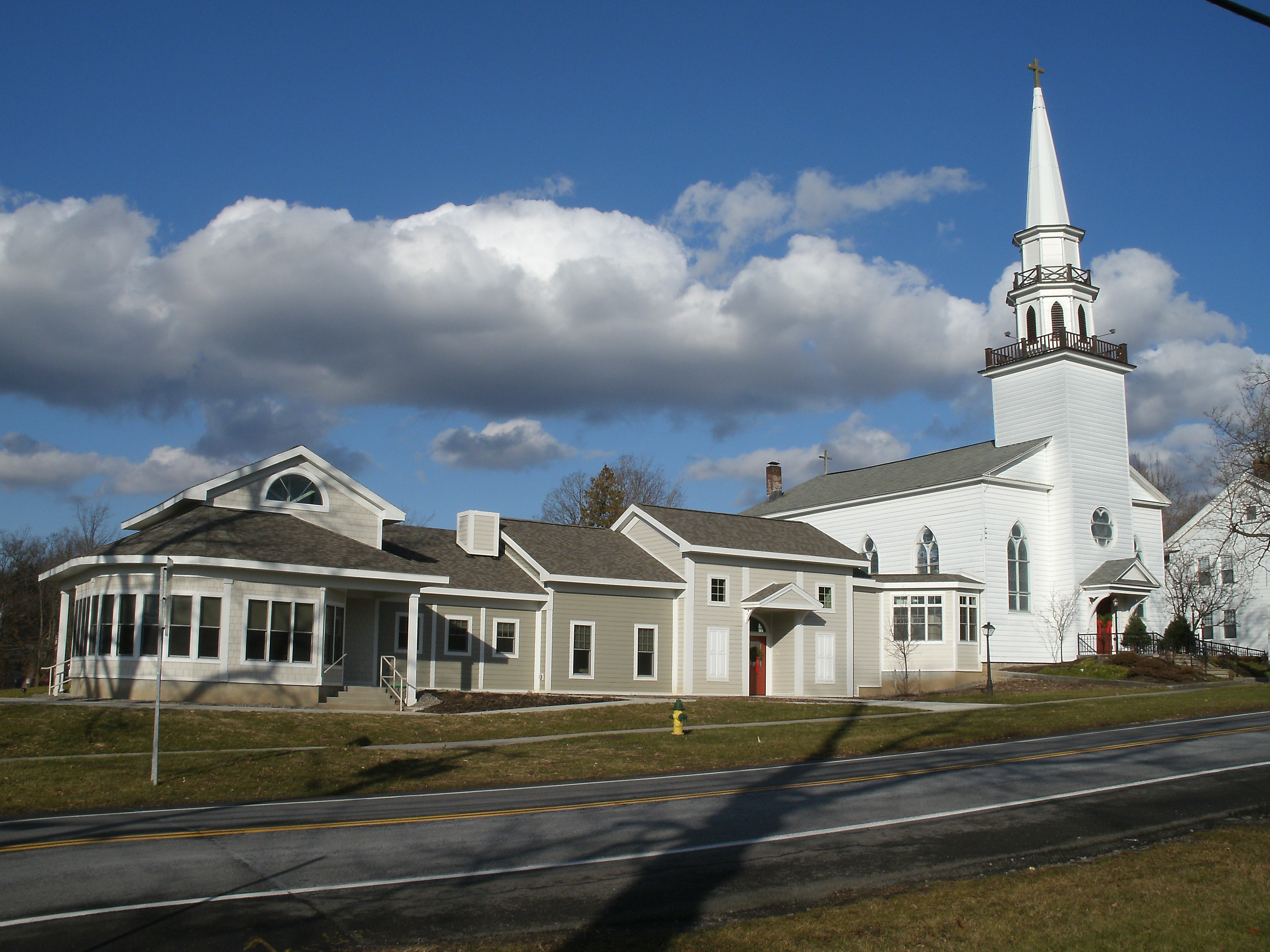
Christ Church, on Seneca Street, with an extension to the left that recently replaced two historic buildings

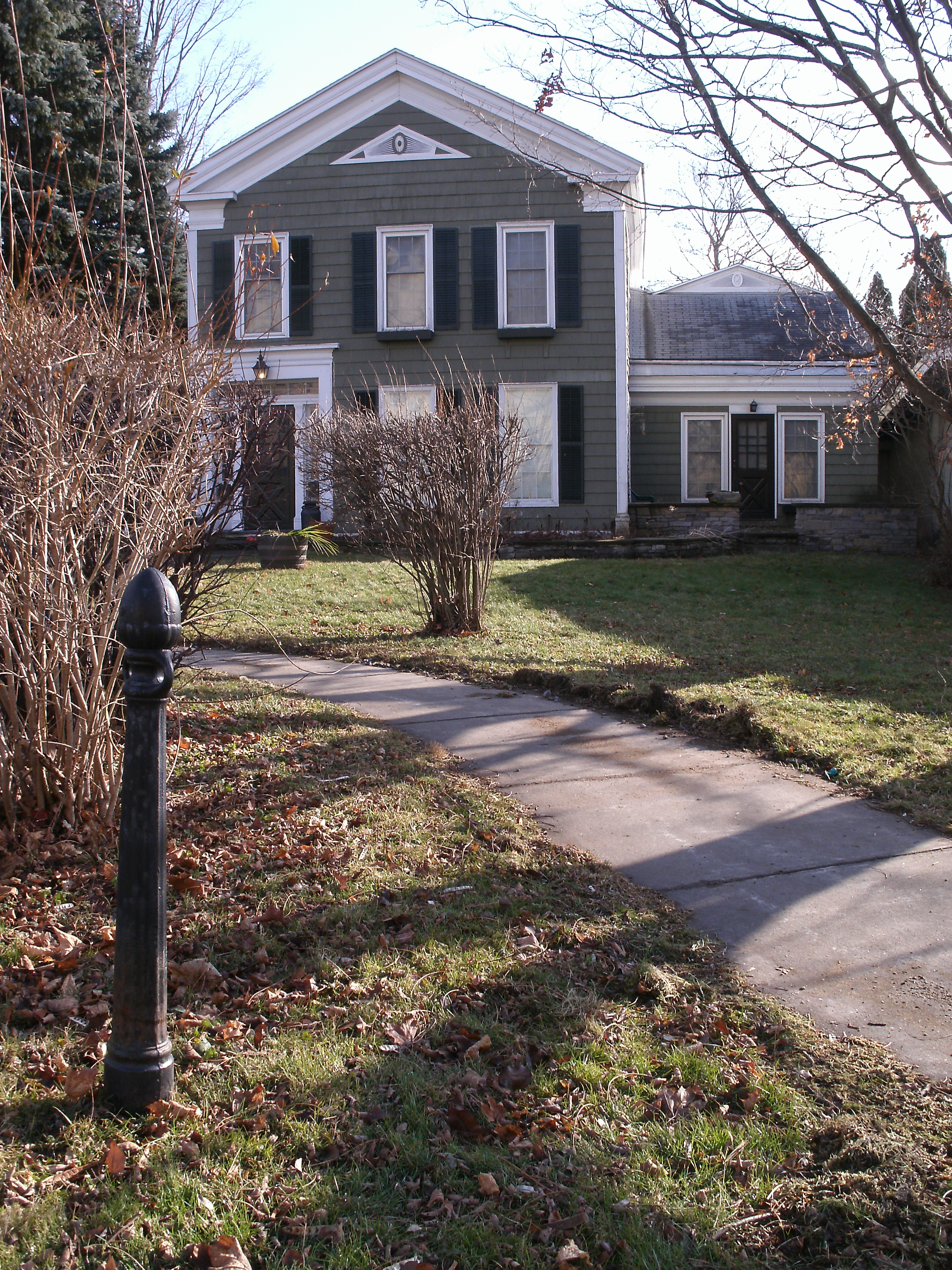
Hitching post in front of 306 Seneca Street

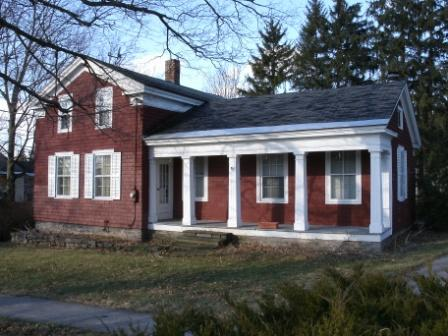
Greek Revival House at 311 Pleasant Street

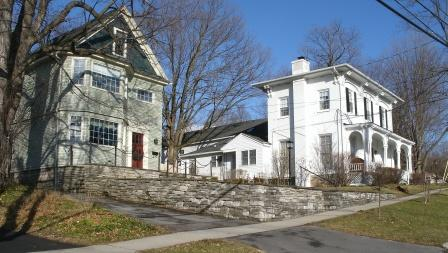
Italianate house at 501 Pleasant Street (right) and its neighbor at 409 Pleasant Street

Beginning at the east side of the district on Seneca Street, the properties in the district are as follows:

- 503 Seneca Street, Greek Revival style residence built in the second wave of construction beginning in the 1830s
- 501 Seneca Street, a pilastered house with an off-center doorway and faced gable end to the street, stone hitching posts flank a stone mounting block at the street, built in the first wave of construction circa 1810
- 500 Seneca Street, described as being from the 1850s - 1860s, no longer standing
- In Academy Park, where the old Cherry Valley Turnpike diverged away from the old Seneca Turnpike (Seneca Street), is the gazebo, built in 1880
- St. Ann's Church, a modern building fitted into an odd-shaped lot and not incompatible with the scale of the nearby historic buildings, was built in 1969
- 417 Seneca Street, stucco-covered limestone, the first wave of construction near 1813, originally commercial, now a residence
- 413 Seneca Street
- 411 Seneca Street
- Christ Episcopal Church, built during the first wave of construction in 1813, moved in 1832 from its original site atop the Seneca Street hill, with gothic elements added in the mid-19th century
- Modern extension of Christ Church replaced separate buildings at 405 and 407 Seneca Street (Note, the former buildings still show in Google satellite view photo as of January 2010)
- 316 Seneca Street, St. Ann's Convent, built in the 1850s - 1860s, Italianate style brick building
- 314 Seneca Street, St. Ann's Rectory, like 105 North Street, is a brick building with an oval window centered in its stepped gables and is three bays wide with two stories and a one-story two-bay wing with the first wave of construction near 1813
- 312 Seneca Street
- 310 Seneca Street
- 306 Seneca Street
- Smith Hall (the Masonic Temple), built 1813–16, the first wave of construction, third-floor added in 1824, brick buildings with stepped gables
- 301 Seneca Street
- Old Baptist Church, from 1827, Greek Revival style church built in the second wave of construction, has lost its steeple and been converted to commercial space
- Vasto Commercial Block, Greek Revival style commercial structure built in the second wave of construction beginning in the 1830s
- 241 Seneca Street

Then, turning right on Franklin Street:

- 105 Franklin Street, brick Bell Telephone building, contemporary style modern intrusion built in 1970
- 108 Franklin Street
- 112 Franklin Street, the first wave of construction near 1813
- 113 Franklin Street, the first wave of construction near 1813

Then, at Pleasant Street, beginning to the left and continuing to the right in an easterly direction:

- 211 Pleasant Street, a pilastered house with an off-center doorway and faced gable end to the street, was built in the first wave of construction near 1813
- 213-25 Pleasant Street
- 301 Pleasant Street
- 305 Pleasant Street
- 307 Pleasant Street
- 309 Pleasant Street, Greek Revival style residence built in the second wave of construction beginning in the 1830s
- 311 Pleasant Street, Greek Revival style residence built in the second wave of construction beginning in the 1830s
- 304 Pleasant Street
- 306 Pleasant Street, Greek Revival style residence built in the second wave of construction beginning in the 1830s
- 308 Pleasant Street, Greek Revival style residence built in the second wave of construction beginning in the 1830s

Then, at Pleasant Street and North Street, turn right onto North Street:

- First Baptist Church, a neo-Federal style brick church built in 1929, at the corner of Pleasant Street
- 117 North Street
- 113 North Street, a pilastered house with an off-center doorway and faced gable end to the street, built in the first wave of construction near 1813
- 106 North Street, no longer standing
- 105 North Street, the Wattles-Van Schaak-Barnes House, with a fruited pediment and narrow pilasters connected by flattened arches, the first wave of construction built near 1813, this one, like 314 Seneca Street, is a brick building with an oval window centered in its stepped gables and is three bays wide with two stories and one-story two-bay wing

Returning to Pleasant Street and continuing east:

- 401 Pleasant Street
- 405 Pleasant Street
- 407 Pleasant Street
- 409 Pleasant Street
- 501 Pleasant Street, pilastered residence with centered front door and nearly flat roof, the first wave of construction near 1813

Turning right on Clinton Street:

- 105 Clinton Street

All photos in this article are from December 2009 unless otherwise noted.

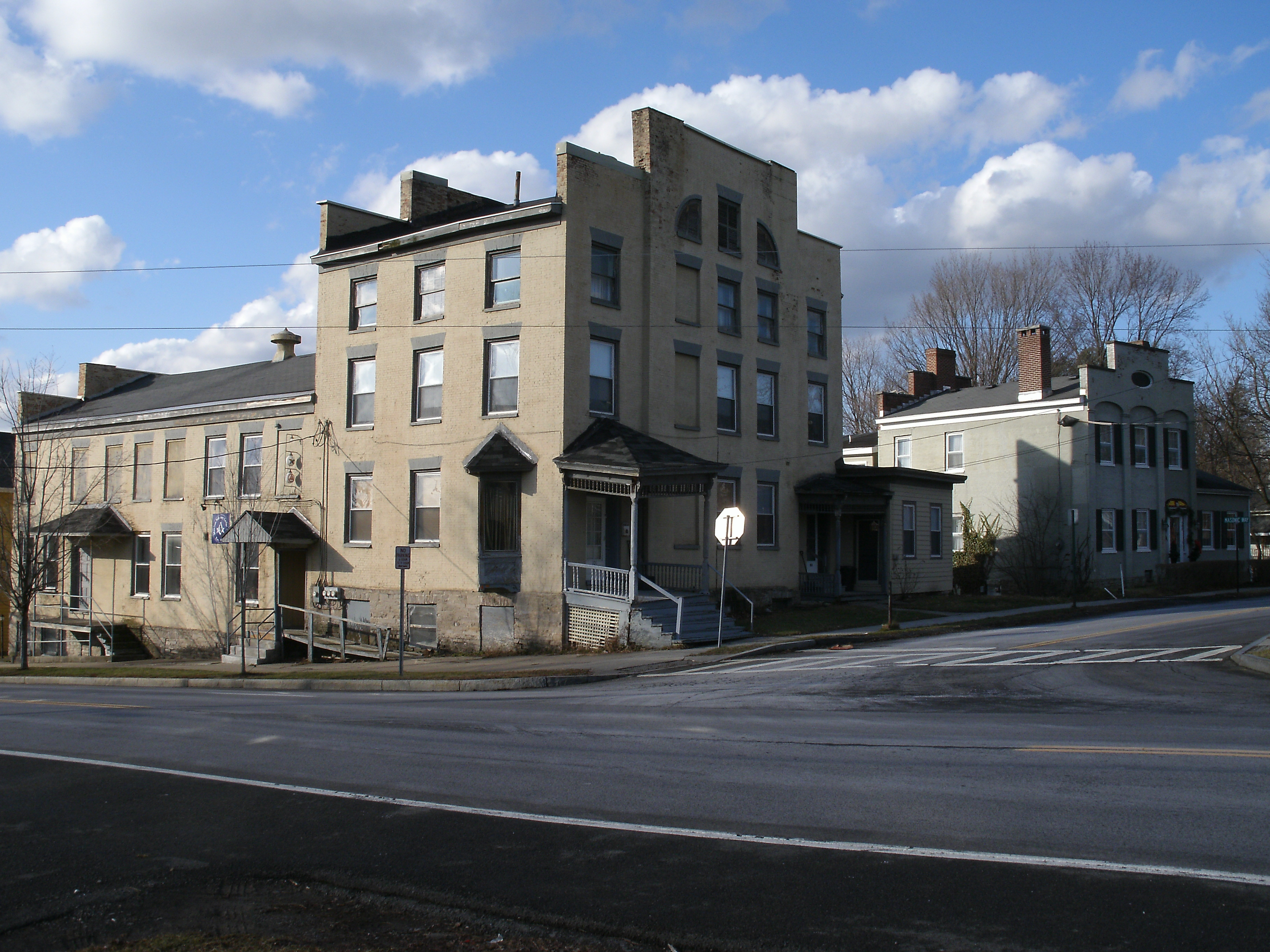
Smith Hall, and, to the right, 105 North Street

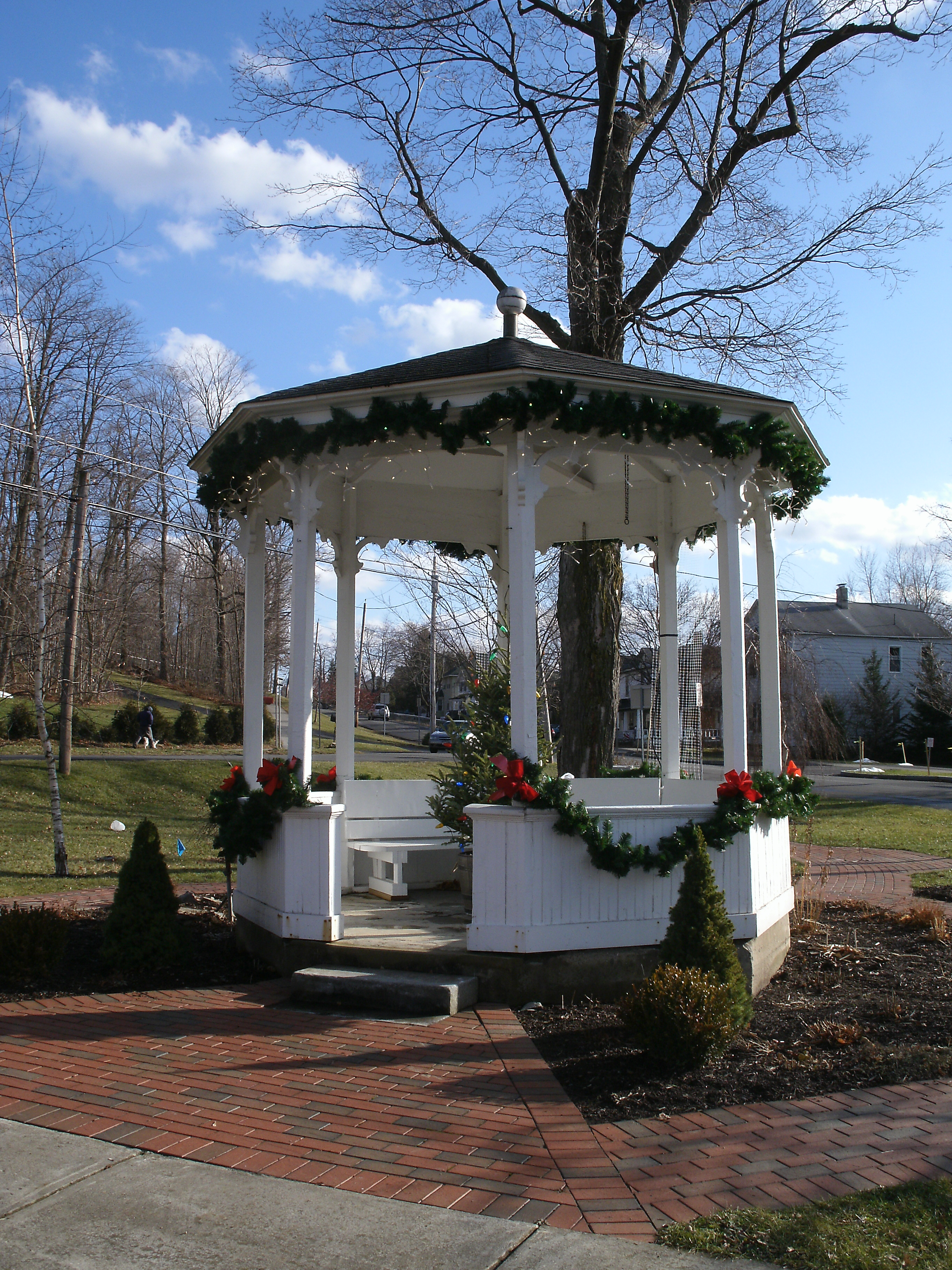
Gazebo in Academy Park

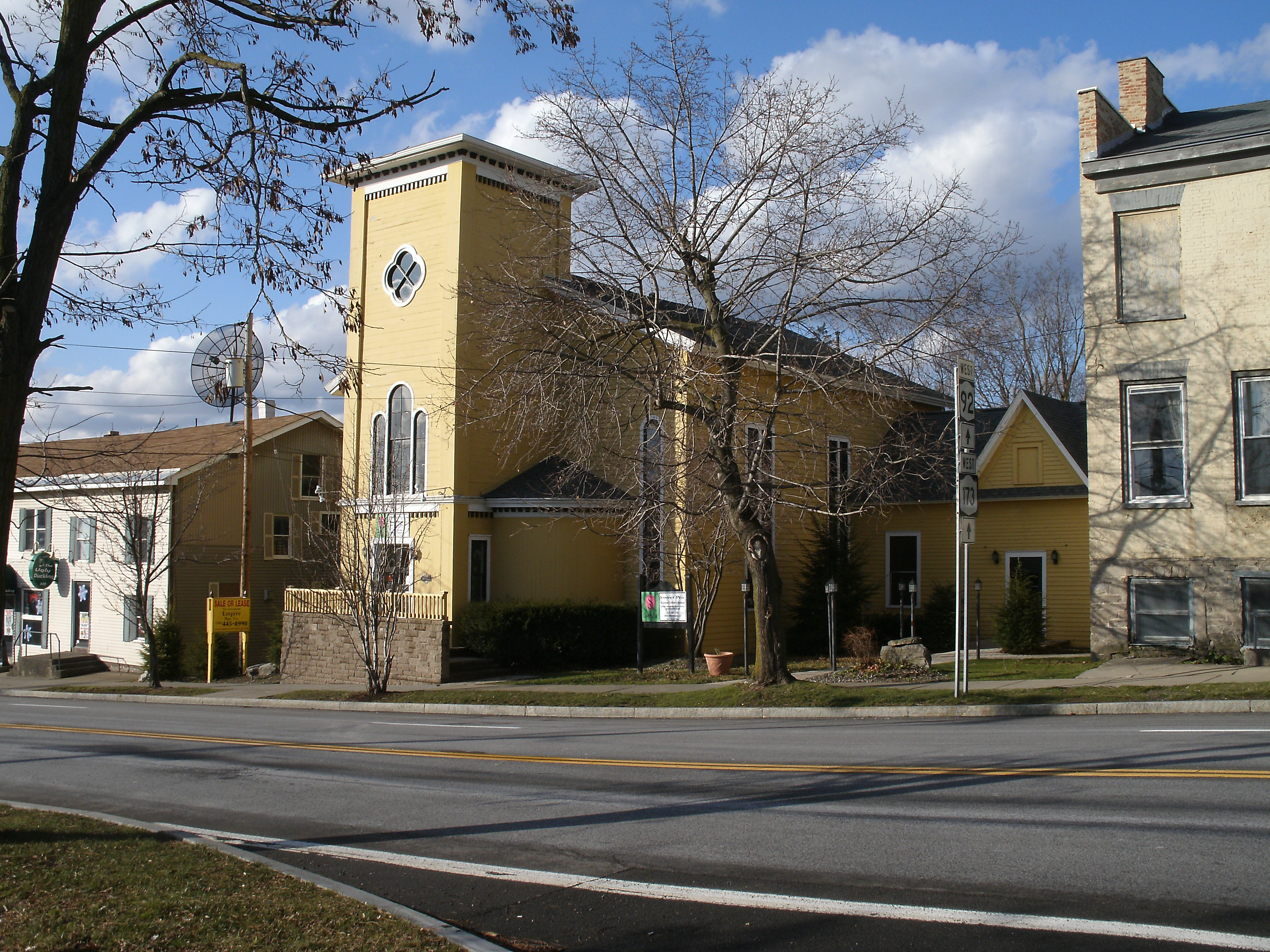
Old Baptist Church

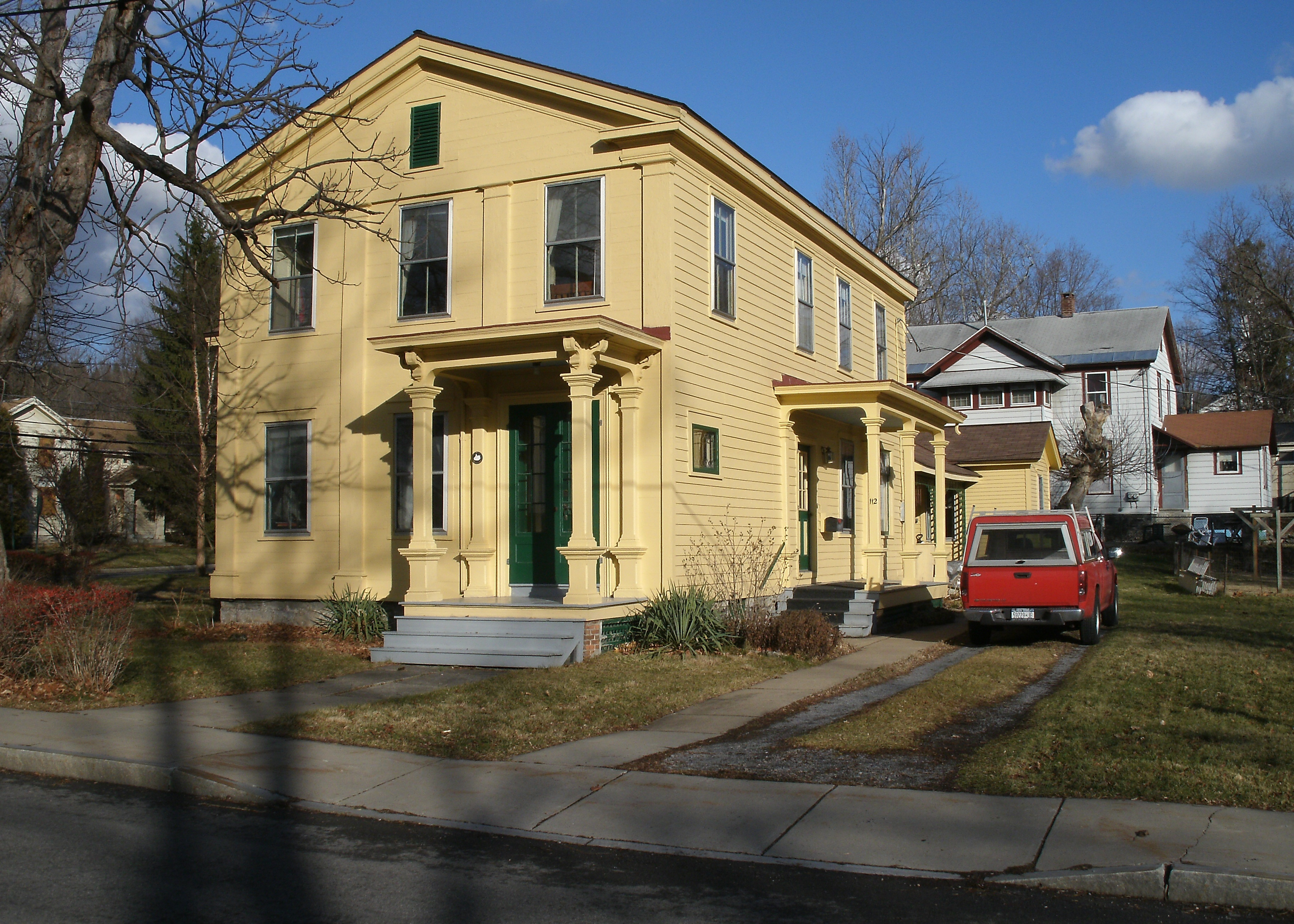
112 Franklin Street, with pilasters

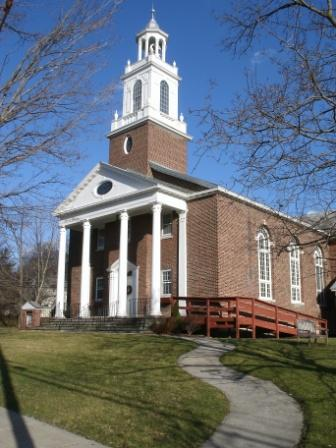
First Baptists Church, built in 1929

== See also ==
- Christ Church and Manlius Village Cemeteries, also NRHP-listed in Manlius
