= New York State Route 92 =

State highway in central New York, US

New York State Route 92
- Map of the Syracuse area with NY 92 highlighted in red

Route information
- Maintained by NYSDOT and the city of Syracuse
- Length: 17.33 mi (27.89 km)
- Existed: 1930–present

Major junctions
- West end: US 11 in Syracuse
- I-81 in DeWitt
- East end: US 20 in Cazenovia

Location
- Country: United States
- State: New York
- Counties: Onondaga, Madison

Highway system
- New York Highways; Interstate; US; State; Reference; Parkways
← NY 91	→ NY 93

New York State Route 92 (NY 92) is a state highway located in central New York in the United States. The western terminus of the route is at an intersection with U.S. Route 11 (US 11, named State Street) in downtown Syracuse. Its eastern terminus is at a junction with US 20 west of the village of Cazenovia. NY 92 is known as East Genesee Street through Syracuse and DeWitt; from DeWitt to Cazenovia, its name varies by location. It heads generally eastward through Syracuse to DeWitt, where it crosses Interstate 81 (I-81) while concurrent with NY 5. At the east end of the overlap, it splits off follows a more southeasterly routing through the village of Manlius to Cazenovia.

NY 92 was assigned as part of the 1930 renumbering of state highways in New York; however, it originally began in Fayetteville. At the time, the portion of Genesee Street in eastern Syracuse was part of NY 5. NY 92 was extended westward into Syracuse in the 1930s after NY 5 was realigned to follow Erie Boulevard instead. NY 92 was concurrent with parts of NY 20N from the 1930s to c. 1962 and with the easternmost section of NY 20SY from the 1950s to in 1961. When NY 20SY was removed in 1961, NY 92 was rerouted to bypass Fayetteville on NY 20SY's former routing southwest of the village.

== Route description ==
=== Syracuse ===
NY 92 begins as a city-maintained highway at an intersection with US 11 (State Street) in downtown Syracuse. The route heads eastward on East Genesee Street, passing under I-81 Bus before splitting into a one-way couplet at Almond Street. For the next two blocks, the eastbound and westbound lanes of NY 92 are separated by a small park situated within the block formed by Almond Street, Forman Avenue, and both directions of Genesee Street. The couplet ends just east of Forman Avenue, at which point NY 92 continues on as a highway two lanes wide with dedicated cycle lanes in each direction.

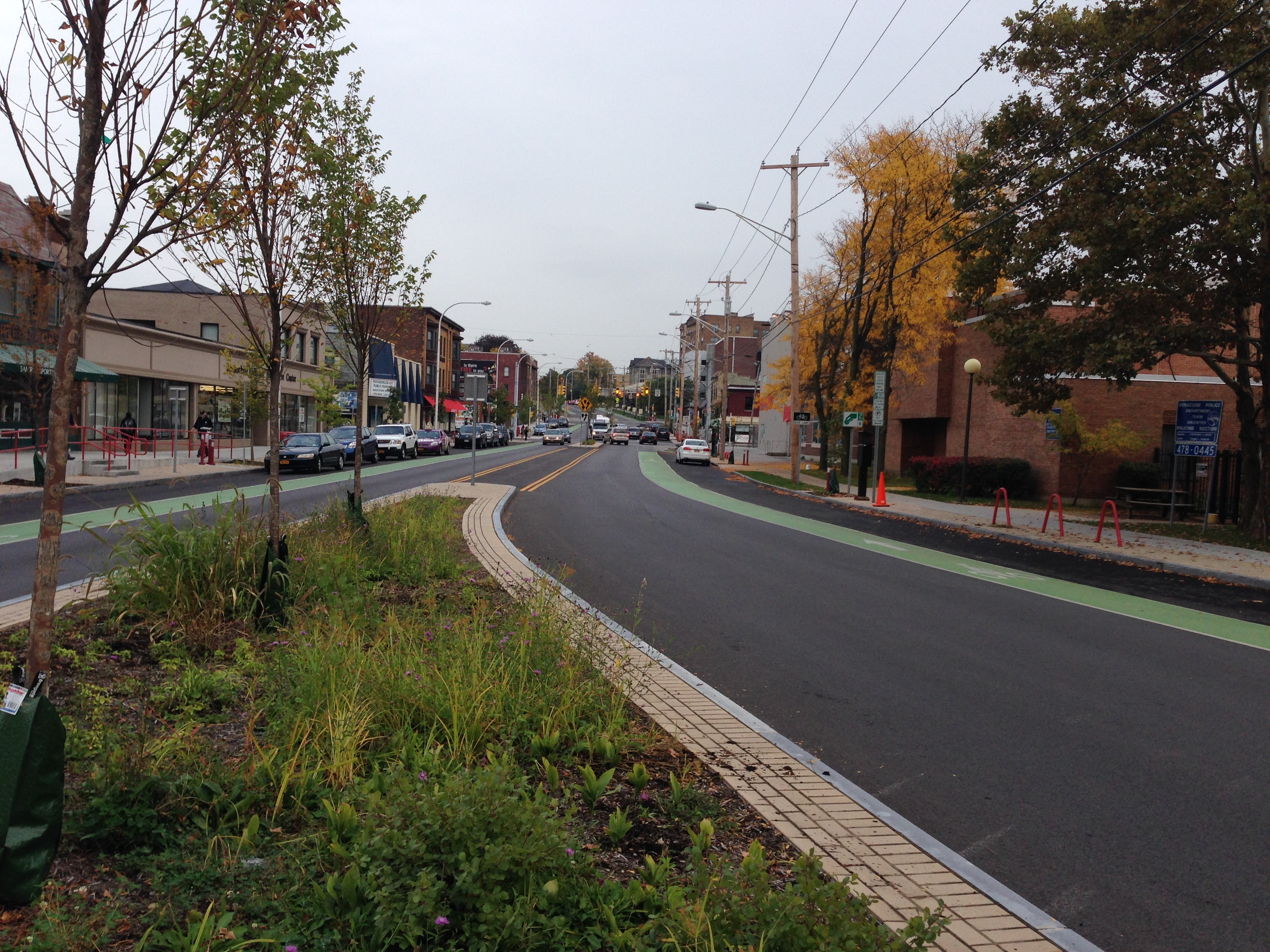
Heading east past Forman Park

At Lexington Avenue, NY 92 begins to turn to the southeast as it heads through more residential areas of the city. At East Avenue, a local street just west of Nottingham Senior High School, a center lane begins, enabling left turns from both directions. The route passes north of the school and St. Mary's Cemetery and south of LeMoyne College before exiting the city limits. At this point, maintenance of the route shifts from Syracuse to the New York State Department of Transportation (NYSDOT). Now in DeWitt, NY 92 continues past several blocks lined with homes to an intersection with Erie Boulevard, a six-lane divided highway that carries NY 5 through eastern Syracuse. The boulevard ends here, however, and NY 5 turns to join NY 92 eastward along Genesee Street.

=== East of Syracuse ===
Not far to the east of this junction, NY 5 and NY 92 meet I-81 by way of a cloverleaf interchange. East of the interchange, Genesee Street widens to six lanes (three in each direction) as it heads along a commercial strip anchored by a large plaza featuring a Wegmans Food Markets store. NY 5 and NY 92 split at the east end of the strip in the hamlet of Lyndon. While NY 5 continues east along Genesee Street to Fayetteville, NY 92 heads southeast along the two-lane Highbridge Road and bypasses Fayetteville to the southwest.

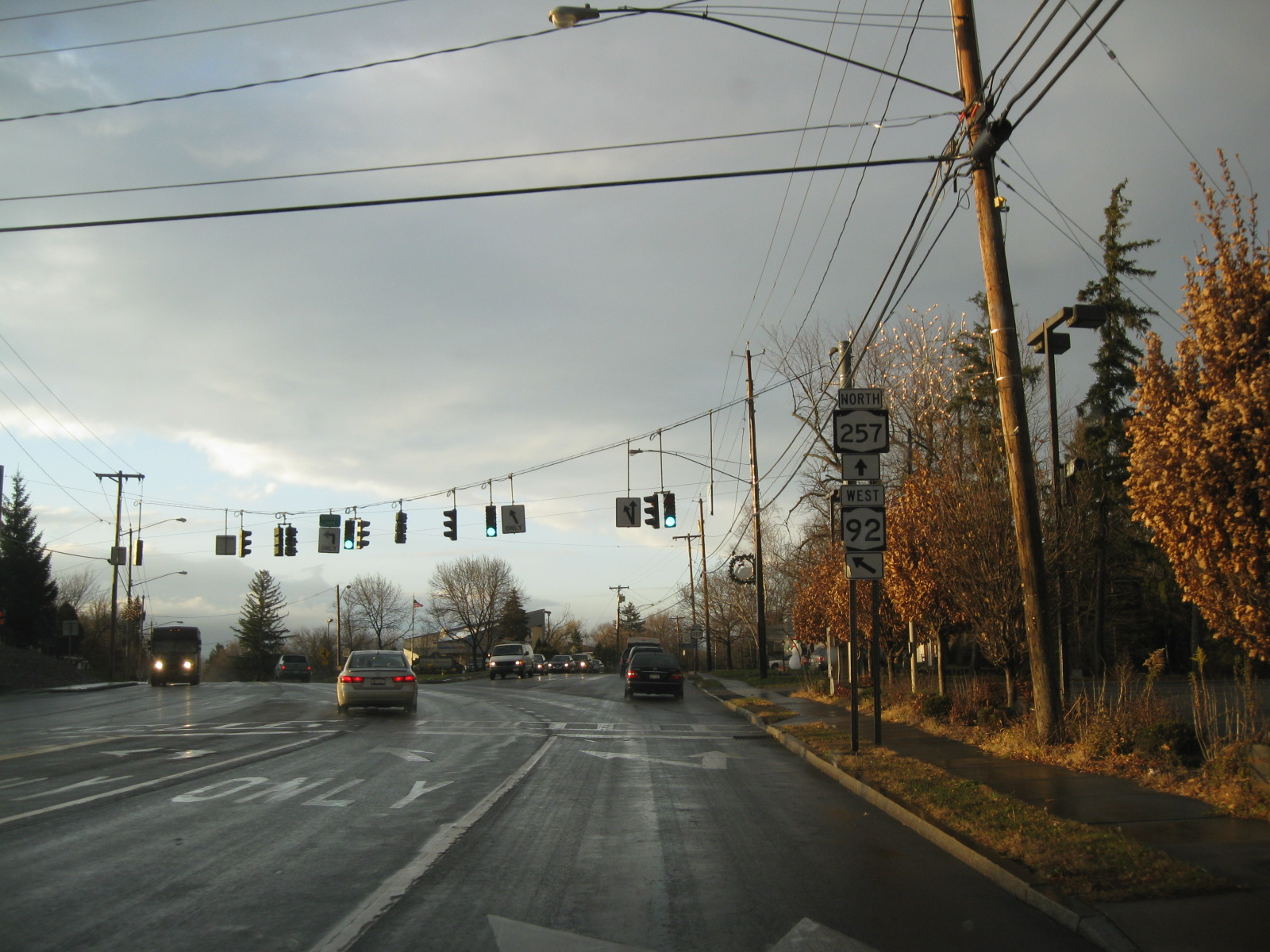
Route 92 westbound at the intersection with Route 257 in the village of Manlius

The route continues into the town of Manlius, where it crosses over Limestone Creek at the hamlet of High Bridge. Past this point, the amount of development along the highway increases as it approaches an intersection with NY 257 just inside of the Manlius village limits. Here, NY 92 becomes four lanes wide once again as it heads along the mostly commercial Fayette Street toward the village center. In the heart of Manlius, NY 92 overlaps with NY 173 for about 750 feet (230 m) past another commercial strip along Seneca Street before resuming its southeasterly progression at Washington Street. It becomes Cazenovia Road upon exiting the village.

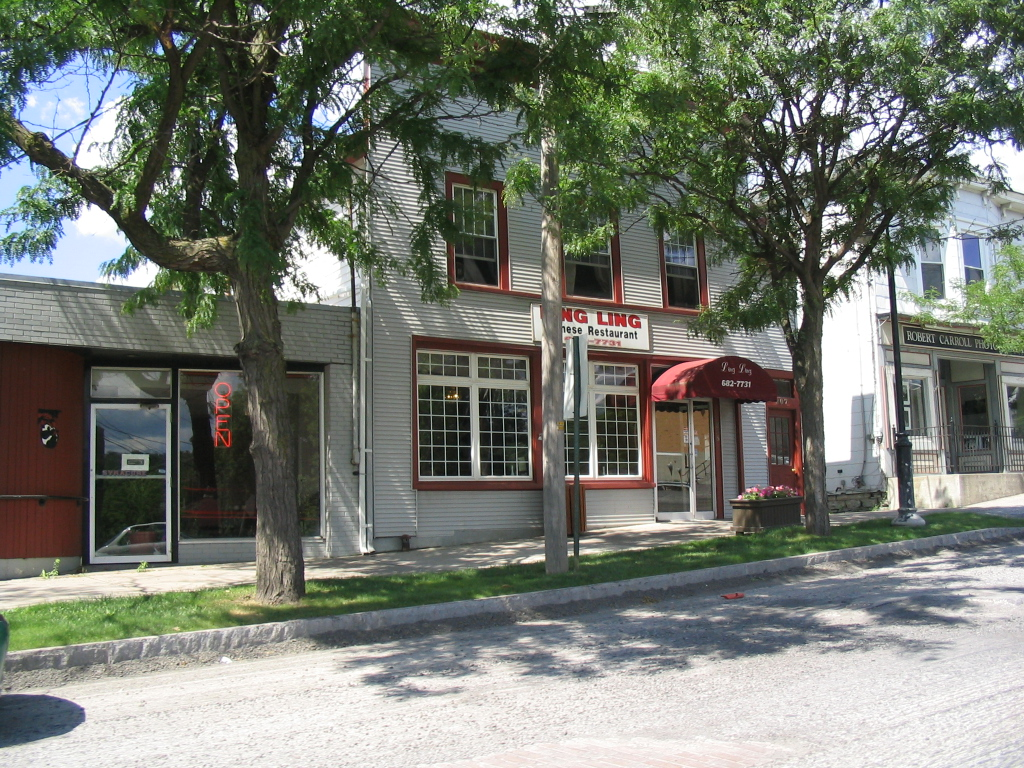
Buildings along NY 92 and NY 173 in Manlius

Outside of the village of Manlius, the amount of development along the route decreases as the homes lining the route become more spaced out. NY 92 follows Limestone Creek southeastward through the towns of Manlius and Pompey to the Madison County line, where the creek turns south to run through Pompey Hollow, an area of flatlands situated on the Onondaga County side of the line. The highway continues on into Madison County, where it becomes known as Syracuse Road as it heads through the town of Cazenovia. Most of NY 92 in Madison County passes through rural, undeveloped areas; however, the section just north of its intersection with US 20 runs along Cazenovia Lake and serves several lakeside homes. NY 92 ends upon intersecting US 20 at the southwestern tip of the lake just west of the village of Cazenovia.

== History ==
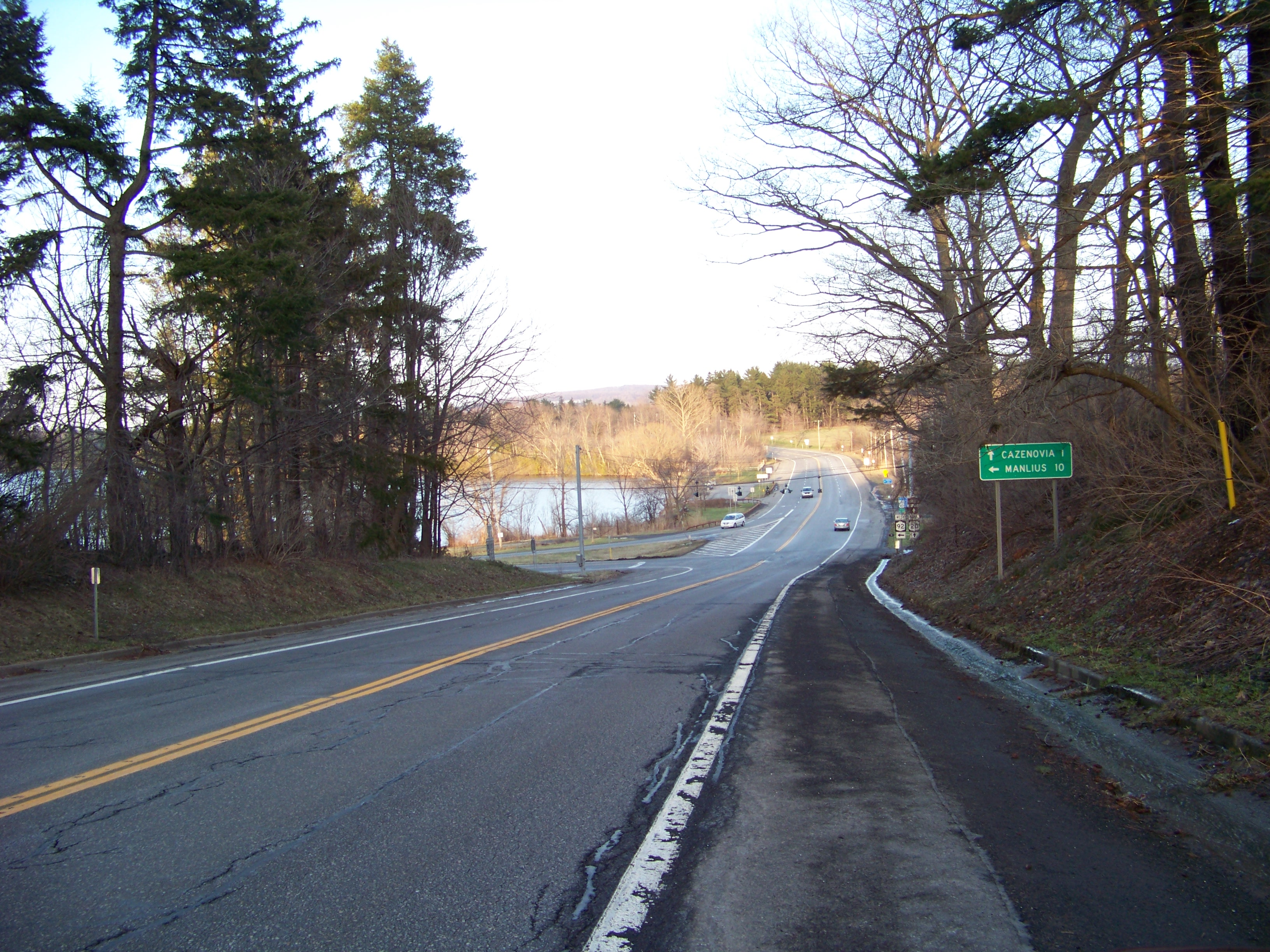
The eastern terminus of NY 92 at an intersection with US 20 in Cazenovia

NY 92 was assigned as part of the 1930 renumbering of state highways in New York to a northwest–southeast roadway connecting Fayetteville to Cazenovia. At Fayetteville, NY 92 ended at NY 5, which continued west into downtown Syracuse on Genesee Street. NY 5 was realigned c. 1934 to follow Erie Boulevard through eastern Syracuse. NY 5's former routing along Genesee Street between Columbus Avenue and Erie Boulevard became a westward extension of NY 92, which overlapped NY 5 from Fayetteville to DeWitt. At Columbus Avenue, NY 92 turned north and followed that street to Erie Boulevard, where it ended at NY 5. NY 92 was extended west along Genesee Street to its current terminus at US 11 in April 1935.

The segment of NY 92 between Manlius and Cazenovia gained another designation in 1937 when it became part of NY 20N, a northerly alternate route of US 20 that was concurrent with other state routes for its entire length. In the early 1950s, the portions of NY 92 west of DeWitt and from Manlius to Cazenovia also became part of NY 20SY, another alternate route of US 20 that veered even farther north than NY 20N in order to serve downtown Syracuse. NY 20SY was realigned slightly between 1952 and 1954 to follow NY 5 through eastern Syracuse instead.

While most of NY 20SY overlapped other state routes, there were two sections where NY 20SY was the sole designation assigned to the highway it ran along. One of the two segments was near Fayetteville, where NY 20SY left NY 5 and NY 92 west of the village and bypassed Fayetteville to the southwest on Highbridge Road before rejoining NY 92 just north of Manlius. The NY 20N and NY 20SY designations were removed in 1961, at which time NY 92 was realigned to bypass Fayetteville by way of NY 20SY's former routing southwest of the village.

== Major intersections ==
County	Location	mi	km	Destinations	Notes
Onondaga	Syracuse	0.00	0.00	US 11 (Salina Street) to I-81 BL north / East Onondaga Street	Western terminus
Onondaga	DeWitt	4.41	7.10	NY 5 west (Erie Boulevard) – Shoppingtown Mall	Western terminus of NY 5 / NY 92 overlap; community of De Witt
Onondaga	DeWitt	4.77	7.68	I-81 to I-90 – Syracuse, Jamesville	Exit 86 (I-81)
Onondaga	DeWitt	5.54	8.92	NY 5 east (East Genesee Street) / Lyndon Road / Bridlepath Road – Fayetteville, Chittenango	Eastern terminus of NY 5 / NY 92 overlap
Onondaga	Village of Manlius	9.00	14.48	NY 257 north (Fayette Street) – Fayetteville	Southern terminus of NY 257; no access from NY 92 east to NY 257 north
Onondaga	Village of Manlius	9.40	15.13	NY 173 west (West Seneca Street) – Jamesville	Western terminus of NY 92 / NY 173 overlap
Onondaga	Village of Manlius	9.56	15.39	NY 173 east (East Seneca Street) – Chittenango	Eastern terminus of NY 92 / NY 173 overlap
Madison	Town of Cazenovia	17.33	27.89	US 20 – Cazenovia, Lafayette	Eastern terminus
1.000 mi = 1.609 km; 1.000 km = 0.621 mi: Concurrency terminus; Incomplete access
