= New York State Route 173 =

State highway in central New York, US

New York State Route 173
- Map of the Syracuse area with NY 173 highlighted in red

Route information
- Maintained by NYSDOT, Onondaga County, and the city of Syracuse
- Length: 30.59 mi (49.23 km)
- Existed: 1930–present

Major junctions
- West end: NY 31 in Van Buren
- NY 5 in Camillus; US 11 in Syracuse
- East end: NY 5 in Chittenango

Location
- Country: United States
- State: New York
- Counties: Onondaga, Madison

Highway system
- New York Highways; Interstate; US; State; Reference; Parkways
← NY 172	→ NY 174

New York State Route 173 (NY 173) is a state highway located in the Syracuse area of central New York in the United States. It takes a slightly bow-shaped route from NY 31 in the town of Van Buren to NY 5 in Chittenango, gently curving to the south of Downtown Syracuse in the center of its 30.59-mile (49.23 km) routing. Even so, NY 173 briefly enters the Syracuse city limits near where it intersects U.S. Route 11 (US 11). NY 173 passes through several suburbs of Syracuse, including Camillus, where it first meets NY 5, and Manlius, where it has a short overlap with NY 92.

NY 173 was assigned as part of the 1930 renumbering of state highways in New York to its modern alignment. The route itself has not been altered since; however, the portion of the route from Onondaga to Manlius became part of NY 20N c. 1938 and a small section of the route within Manlius was included in NY 20SY when that highway was assigned in the early 1950s. Both designations were removed in 1961. All of NY 173 east of Onondaga was originally part of the Seneca Turnpike.

== Route description ==
=== West of Syracuse ===
NY 173 begins at an intersection with NY 31 in Ionia, a hamlet within the town of Van Buren. The route heads southeast, intersecting several county roads as it proceeds through a rural, marshy area of Onondaga County as Warners Road. It crosses over the New York State Thruway (Interstate 90 or I-90) on its way into the hamlet of Warners, where it briefly follows Canton Street and crosses the CSX Transportation-owned Rochester Subdivision rail line before becoming Warners Road once again as it follows the railroad east out of the community and into the town of Camillus.

The route parallels the track for roughly 2 miles (3.2 km), over which time it passes to the north of Greenlawn Memorial Park. As the trackage and the highway approach a point known as Amboy Station, NY 173 curves away from the railroad and heads southeast toward Amboy. After making the turn, NY 173 meets Pottery Road (County Route 164 or CR 164), a local road leading to Camillus Airport, a simple one-runway facility located adjacent to the railroad line. NY 173 continues into and through Amboy, passing a large area of tailings that was once the site of the Syracuse Municipal Airport. The brownfields are bordered to the north by Ninemile Creek and to the south by the Old Erie Canal, both of which are traversed by NY 173 on its way into the densely populated Fairmount neighborhood of Camillus.

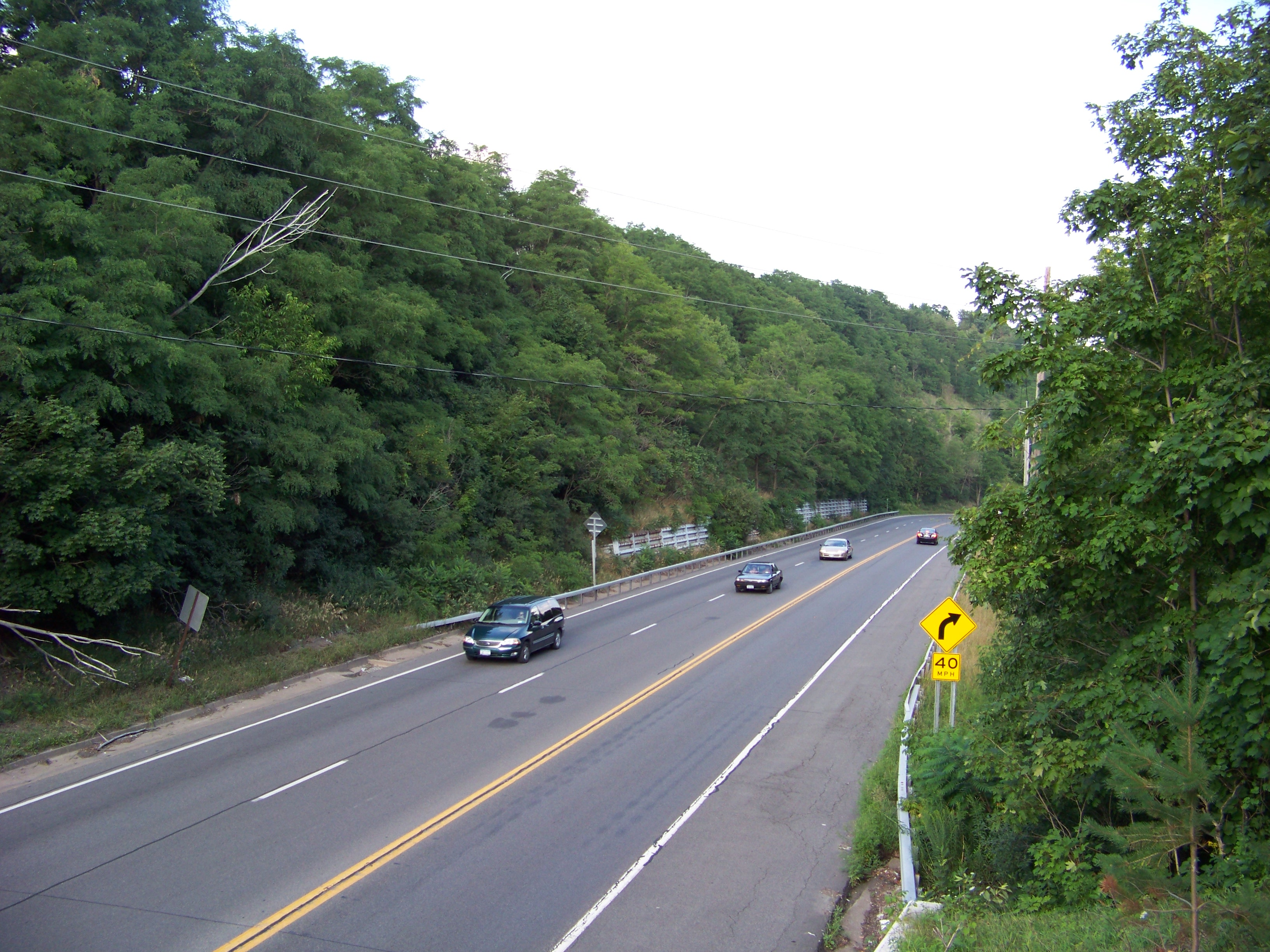
NY 173 heading east from Onondaga Hill

In Fairmount, NY 173 passes Reed Webster Park and turns to the east ahead of the Camillus Bypass, a limited-access highway carrying NY 5 through the town. NY 173 parallels NY 5 for about 1 mile (1.6 km) before connecting to westbound NY 5 by way of a partial interchange; the eastbound connection is made by way of Hinsdale Road (CR 209) 1 mile (1.6 km) to the west. East of the westbound on-ramps, NY 173 passes over NY 5 and turns to the southeast ahead of an intersection with NY 297. The route continues on through Fairmount, intersecting West Genesee Street (CR 98) before becoming Onondaga Road and exiting the neighborhood upon entering the town of Onondaga.

Within Onondaga, NY 173 passes through both open areas with sparse development and areas containing built-up residential neighborhoods. The route heads southeast to Onondaga Hill, a large community built up just east of Onondaga Community College. Here, it overlaps with NY 175 for about 100 yards (91 m) before NY 175 forks off to the northeast into Syracuse. NY 173 continues eastward as the Seneca Turnpike, passing to the south of Community General Hospital before it enters the southernmost portion of Syracuse. This portion of the city is mostly residential, save for a smattering of businesses around NY 173's junctions with NY 80 and US 11. Near the midpoint of the route's 2 miles (3.2 km) stay in Syracuse, it crosses over Onondaga Creek, on the banks of which lie Faith Heritage School and Meachem Field. The route leaves the city limits shortly after passing under both directions of I-81.

All of NY 173 west of Genesee Street in Camillus is maintained by Onondaga County. NY 173 is co-designated with CR 204 from NY 31 to Bennetts Corners Road in Van Buren, CR 64 between Bennetts Corners Road and Canton Street in the hamlet of Warners, CR 57 from Canton Street to Thompson Road in Camillus (note- a portion of former NY 57 in Onondaga County is signed as CR 57 but is officially part of CR 91), and CR 63 between Thompson Road and Genesee Street. Within Syracuse, NY 173 is maintained by the city. The remainder of the route in both Onondaga and Madison counties is maintained by the New York State Department of Transportation.

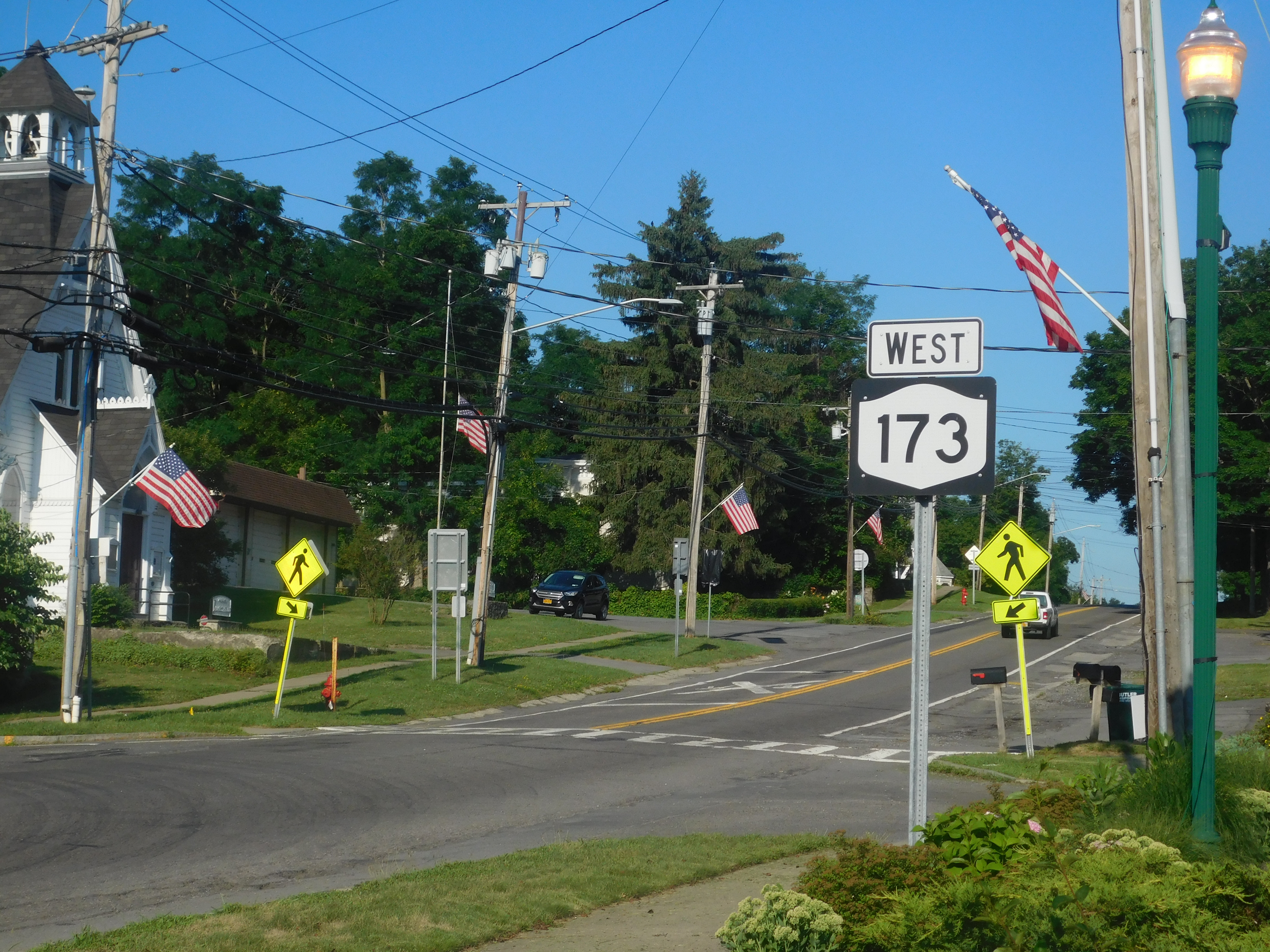
NY 173 westbound in Jamesville

=== East of Syracuse ===
East of Syracuse, the route passes through a narrow 1 mile (1.6 km) portion of the town of Onondaga and the hamlet of Southwood before entering the adjacent town of DeWitt. It continues east, serving Clark Reservation State Park as it heads toward the community of Jamesville, located at the northern end of the Jamesville Reservoir on Butternut Creek. Here, NY 173 intersects NY 91 in the center of the hamlet. Past Jamesville, the homes that had lined the highway give way to open areas to the south and large quarries to the north. The route passes north of the Onondaga County Correctional Facility just east of Jamesville.

NY 173 continues on into the town of Manlius, where the homes gradually return as the highway enters the village of Manlius. Inside the village limits, the route becomes surrounded by homes once again as it crosses over Limestone Creek and enters the village's business district. Here, it intersects and briefly overlaps NY 92 for roughly 250 yards (230 m) between Fayette and Washington Streets. At Washington Street, NY 92 turns to the southeast towards Cazenovia while NY 173 continues northeastward out of the village. Now back in the surrounding town of Manlius, NY 173 passes south of Fayetteville–Manlius High School before entering another rural area near a point known as Eagle Village. The route continues northeast from there into Madison County.

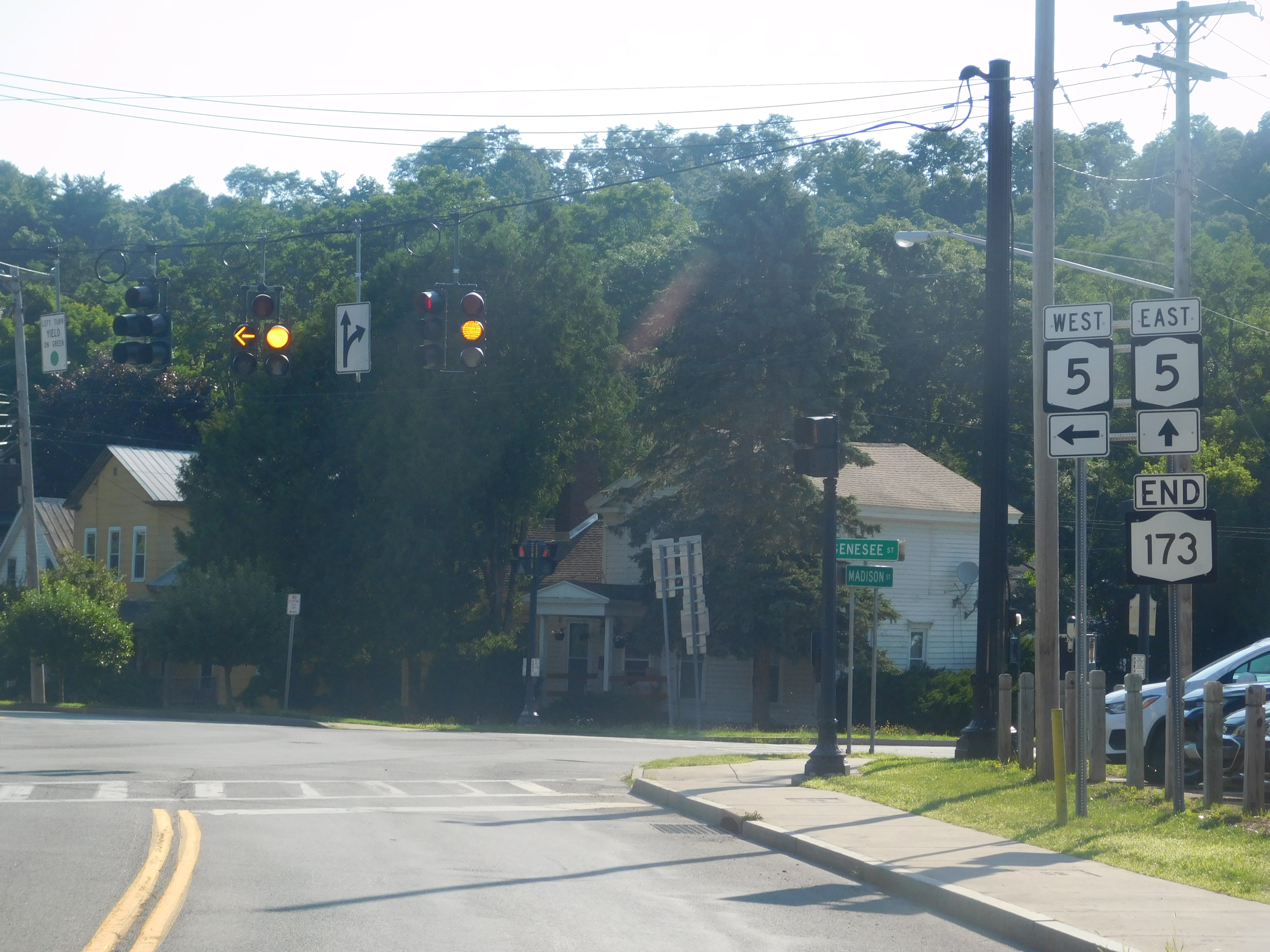
NY 173 eastbound approaching NY 5 in Chittenango

Upon crossing the county line, NY 173 initially turns slightly eastward to follow a less pronounced northeasterly alignment. However, as the route approaches the Chittenango Creek valley, it gradually turns northward. At Brinkerhoff Hill, NY 173 enters the Chittenango village limits and descends into the valley, where it ends at an intersection with NY 5 in the village center at the base of the valley.

== History ==
The portion of modern NY 173 between NY 175 in Onondaga and NY 5 in Chittenango was originally part of the original Seneca Turnpike. The Seneca Turnpike was originally the longest road in the state of New York when it was built in the 1800s. NY 173 was assigned as part of the 1930 renumbering of state highways in New York to the entirety of its modern alignment. Although NY 173 itself has not changed since that time, other routes have been overlaid on parts of NY 173 over the years. The segment of NY 173 between NY 175 in Onondaga and the east end of the NY 92 overlap in Manlius became part of NY 20N, a northerly alternate route of US 20 between Skaneateles and Cazenovia, c. 1938. In the early 1950s, the portion of NY 173 concurrent with NY 92 in Manlius also became part of NY 20SY, a second, even more northern alternate route of US 20 between Marcellus and Cazenovia. The NY 20N and NY 20SY designations were removed in 1961.

== Major intersections ==
County	Location	mi	km	Destinations	Notes
Onondaga	Van Buren	0.00	0.00	NY 31 – Jordan, Baldwinsville	Western terminus; hamlet of Ionia
Onondaga	Town of Camillus	8.01	12.89	NY 5 – Camillus, Auburn	Access to westbound NY 5 only
Onondaga	Town of Camillus	8.51	13.70	NY 297 north – Solvay	Neighborhood of Fairmount; southern terminus of NY 297
Onondaga	Onondaga	13.28	21.37	NY 175 west – Marcellus, Skaneateles	Western end of NY 173 and NY 175 overlap; hamlet of Onondaga Hill
Onondaga	Onondaga	13.34	21.47	NY 175 east	Eastern end of NY 173 and NY 175 overlap; hamlet of Onondaga Hill
Onondaga	Syracuse	14.70	23.66	NY 80	
Onondaga	Syracuse	15.24	24.53	US 11	
Onondaga	Town of DeWitt	19.24	30.96	NY 91 south	Hamlet of Jamesville; northern terminus of NY 91
Onondaga	Village of Manlius	24.10	38.79	NY 92 west – Fayetteville	Western end of NY 92 and NY 173 overlap
Onondaga	Village of Manlius	24.26	39.04	NY 92 east – Cazenovia	Eastern end of NY 92 and NY 173 overlap
Madison	Chittenango	30.59	49.23	NY 5 – Fayetteville, Canastota	Eastern terminus
1.000 mi = 1.609 km; 1.000 km = 0.621 mi: Concurrency terminus; Incomplete access

== See also ==
- List of county routes in Onondaga County, New York
