= Forman Park =

Park in Syracuse, New York

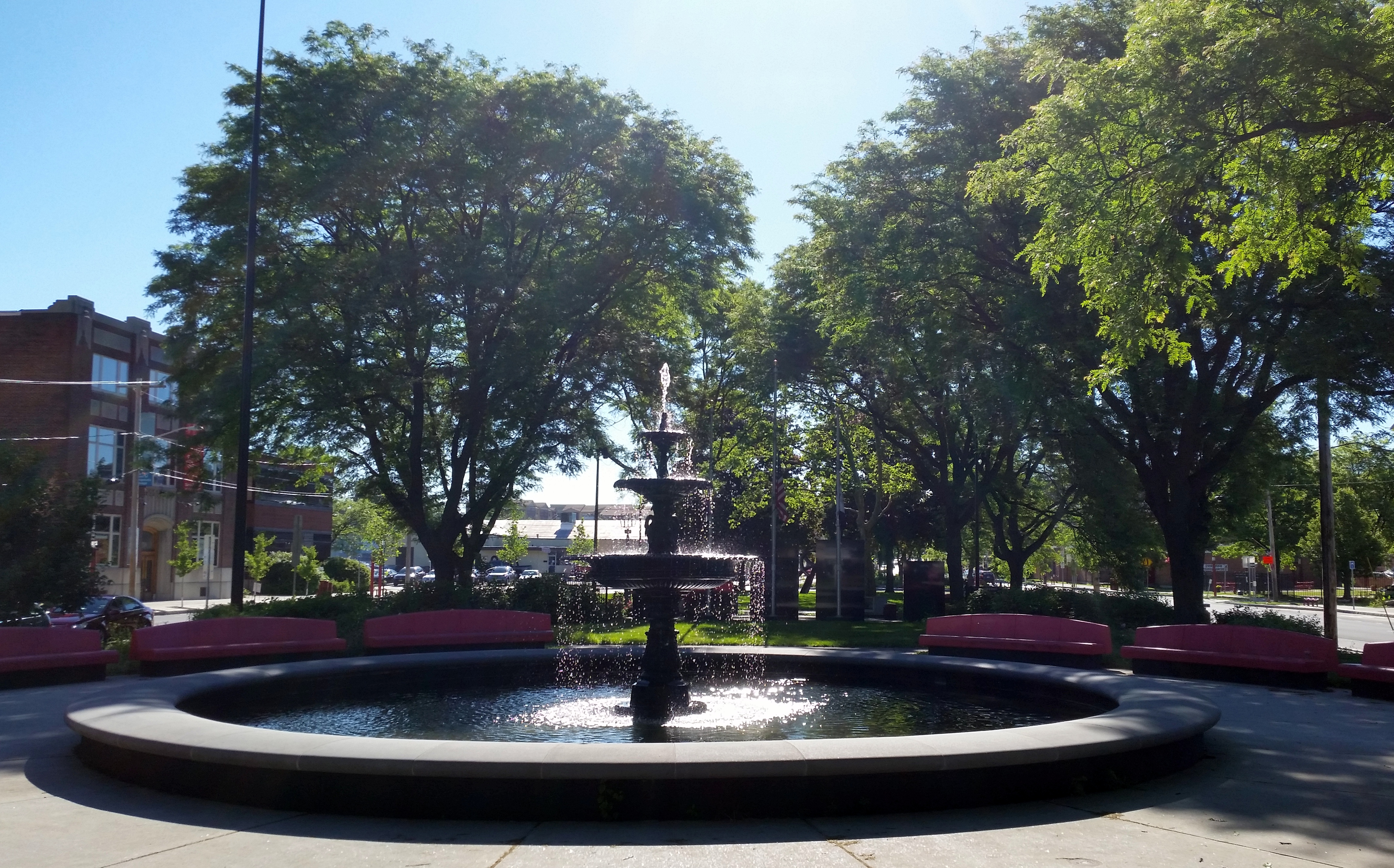

- Location within New York
- 43°2′49.79″N 76°8′27.89″W
- Location: Syracuse, New York

History
- Established: June 16, 1839

Site notes
- Area: 1.335 acres (0.00540 km^{2})
- Governing body: City of Syracuse

Forman Park, in Syracuse, New York, was first established on June 16, 1839 and was known as Forman Square. The main attraction is a bronze memorial of early civic leaders, Joshua Forman and Lewis H. Redfield.

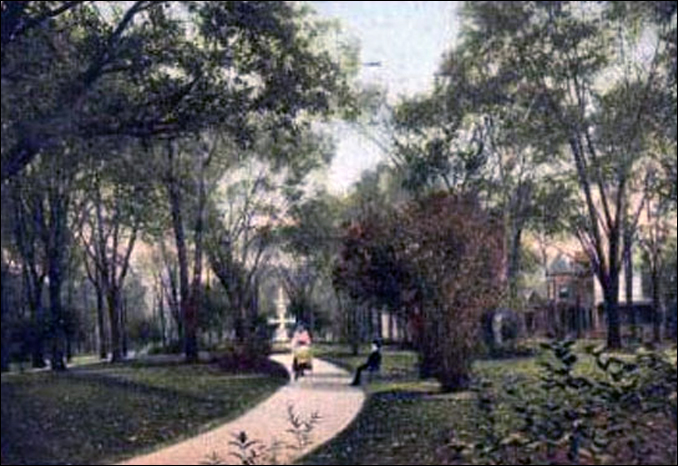
Forman Park circa 1900

The park was established by the Forman Park Trustees of the village of Syracuse.

== See also ==
- Downtown Syracuse
