= Manlius, New York =

Town in New York, United States

Manlius
- Town
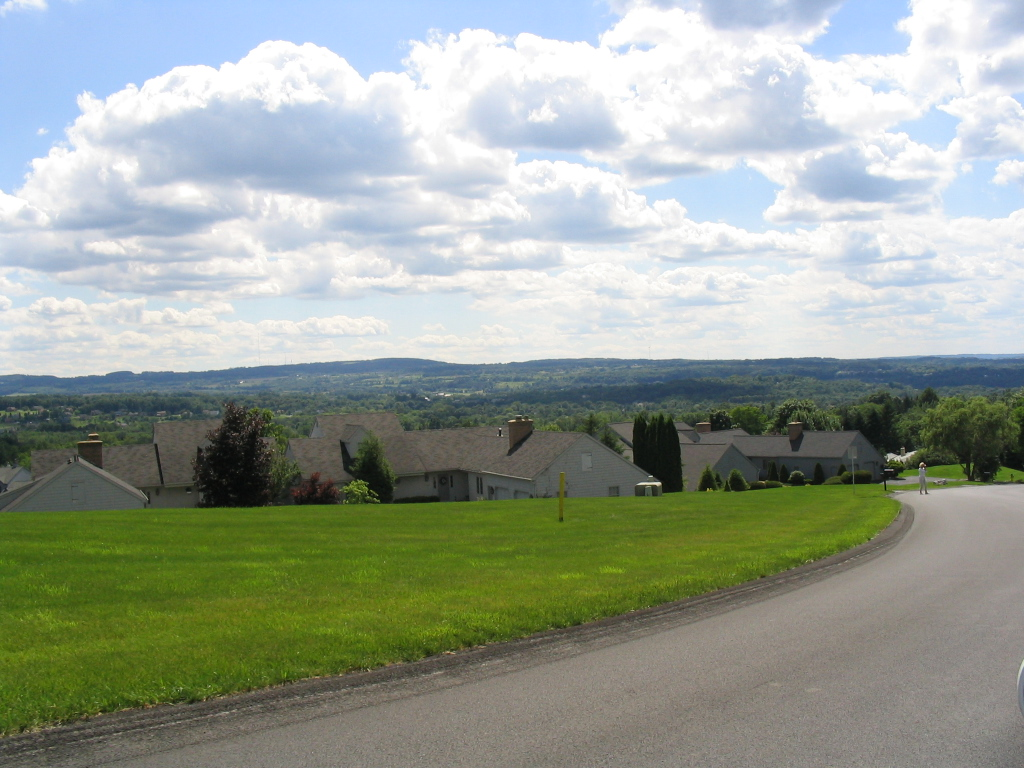
- A neighborhood in the hills of the town of Manlius outside the village of Manlius

- Seal

- Location in Onondaga County and the state of New York.
- Coordinates: 43°02′53″N 075°58′58″W
- Country: United States
- State: New York
- County: Onondaga
- Established: 1794

Government
  - Type: Town Board
  - Supervisor: Sara Bollinger (D)
  - Councilors: List: Alissa Italiano (D); Katelyn M. Kriesel (D); Michael V. Nesci (D); William J. Nicholson (D); Ingrid Gonzalez-McCurdy (D); Brett Edkins (D)

Area
  - Total: 49.95 sq mi (129.38 km^{2})
  - Land: 49.22 sq mi (127.48 km^{2})
  - Water: 0.73 sq mi (1.90 km^{2})
- Elevation: 669 ft (204 m)

Population (2020)
  - Total: 33,712
  - Density: 684.92/sq mi (264.45/km^{2})
- Time zone: UTC-5 (Eastern (EST))
  - Summer (DST): UTC-4 (EDT)
- ZIP code: 13057, 13066, 13082, 13104, 13116
- Area code: 315
- FIPS code: 36-45029
- GNIS feature ID: 0979192
- Website: https://www.townofmanlius.gov/}Town of Manlius

Manlius is a town to the southeast of Syracuse in Onondaga County, New York, United States. As of the 2020 Census, the population was 33,712, making it the third largest suburb in metropolitan Syracuse.

The town of Manlius includes a village also named Manlius, along with the villages of Fayetteville and Minoa. It is located on the eastern border of Onondaga County.

== History ==
In the 17th century, Onondaga people settled a town on the south side of what would later become Manlius. French explorers visited the town around 1654 and described the town as having an earthwork and ringed by walls. The town was occupied through 1682. This site became Indian Hill Memorial Park.

Manlius was a township of the former Central New York Military Tract. Manlius is the name of several important Romans, but exactly which one was being honored is no longer known. The current town was first settled around 1790.

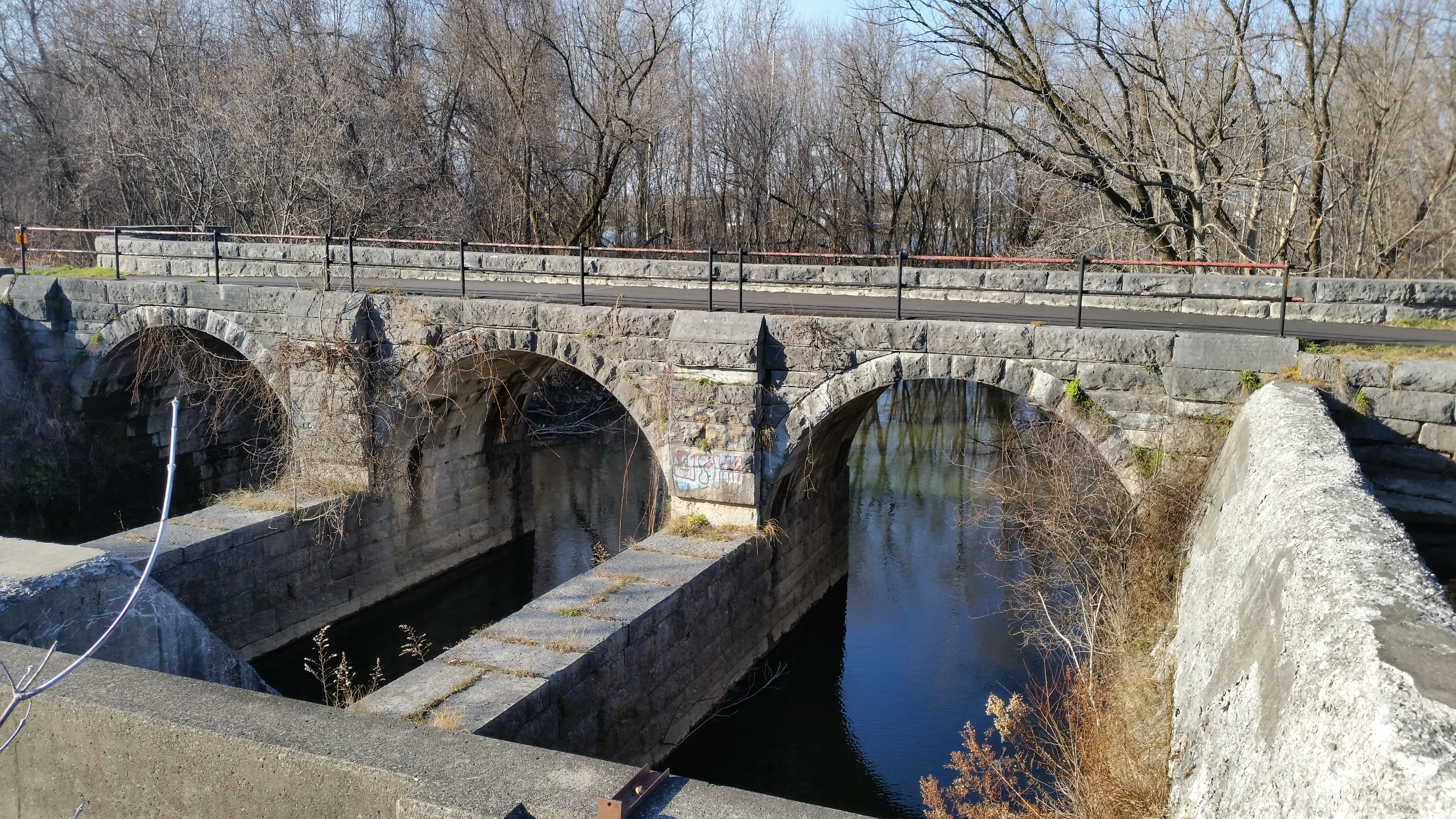
Old Erie Canal aqueduct over Limestone Creek

The town of Manlius was founded in 1794, along with Onondaga County, which decreased with the formation of new towns (DeWitt, Onondaga, Salina) and part of Syracuse.

The economy related to trade generated by the Erie Canal contributed to the early development of the town.

The Christ Church and Manlius Village Cemeteries and Mycenae Schoolhouse are listed on the National Register of Historic Places.

== Geography ==
The eastern town line is the border of Madison County, New York, marked in part by Chittenango Creek. The town of DeWitt is to the west, the town of Pompey is to the south, and the town of Cicero is to the north.

According to the United States Census Bureau, the town has a total area of 50.0 square miles (129.4 km^{2}), of which 49.6 square miles (128.5 km^{2}) is land and 0.3 square mile (0.9 km^{2}) (0.68%) is water.

The New York State Thruway (Interstate 90) crosses the northern part of Manlius. New York State Route 290 crosses the northwestern corner of the town. New York State Route 5 (in part, Genesee Turnpike) and New York State Route 173 (Seneca Turnpike) are east-west highways. New York State Route 257 is a north-south state highway, while New York State Route 92 (Cazenovia Rd) is a northwest-southeast highway.

== Demographics ==
Historical population
Census	Pop.	Note	%±
1820	5,372		—
1830	7,375		37.3%
1840	5,509		−25.3%
1850	6,298		14.3%
1860	6,028		−4.3%
1870	5,833		−3.2%
1880	5,954		2.1%
1890	5,453		−8.4%
1900	5,374		−1.4%
1910	6,016		11.9%
1920	6,599		9.7%
1930	7,620		15.5%
1940	7,845		3.0%
1950	10,221		30.3%
1960	19,351		89.3%
1970	26,071		34.7%
1980	28,530		9.4%
1990	30,656		7.5%
2000	31,872		4.0%
2010	32,370		1.6%
2020	33,712		4.1%
U.S. Decennial Census

As of the census of 2020, there were 31,709 people, 13,711 households, and 8,887 families residing in the town. The population density was 642.3 inhabitants per square mile (248.0/km^{2}). There were 13,071 housing units at an average density of 263.4 per square mile (101.7/km^{2}). The racial makeup of the town was 88.2% White, 1.5% Black or African American, 0.1% Native American, 4.5% Asian, 0.01% Pacific Islander, 0.17% from other races, and 4.0% from two or more races. Hispanic or Latino of any race were 3.2% of the population.

There were 12,553 households, out of which 34.5% had children under the age of 18 living with them, 60.2% were married couples living together, 8.0% had a female householder with no husband present, and 29.2% were non-families. 25.3% of all households were made up of individuals, and 10.9% had someone living alone who was 65 years of age or older. The average household size was 2.51 and the average family size was 3.04.

The population in the town was spread out, with 26.4% under the age of 18, 4.7% from 18 to 24, 26.7% from 25 to 44, 26.7% from 45 to 64, and 15.5% who were 65 years of age or older. The median age was 41 years. For every 100 females, there were 91.3 males. For every 100 females age 18 and over, there were 86.4 males.

The median income for a household in the town was $60,118, and the median income for a family was $70,655. As of the 2008 estimate, however, these figures had risen to $71,830 and $88,272, respectively. Males had a median income of $52,065 versus $31,486 for females. The per capita income for the town was $31,825, but had risen to $39,688 in 2008. About 2.0% of families and 3.3% of the population were below the poverty line, including 3.5% of those under age 18 and 4.7% of those age 65 or over.

== Education ==
Fayetteville-Manlius Central School District, East Syracuse-Minoa Central School District, and Chittenango Central School District each serve sections of the Town of Manlius.

Before the school districts were formed, the historic Mycenae Schoolhouse was used.

=== Elementary schools ===
- Enders Road Elementary School
- Fayetteville Elementary School
- Fremont Elementary School
- Minoa Elementary School
- Mott Road Elementary School
- Woodland Elementary School

=== Middle schools ===
- Eagle Hill Middle School
- Wellwood Middle School (formerly Fayetteville High School)

=== High school ===
- Fayetteville-Manlius High School
- East Syracuse-Minoa High School

=== Private secondary ===
The Manlius School, formerly St. John's Military School, merged with the Pebble Hill School in 1970 to become the Manlius Pebble Hill School. The school's Manlius campus was closed following the merger in 1974.

== Communities and locations in the Town of Manlius ==
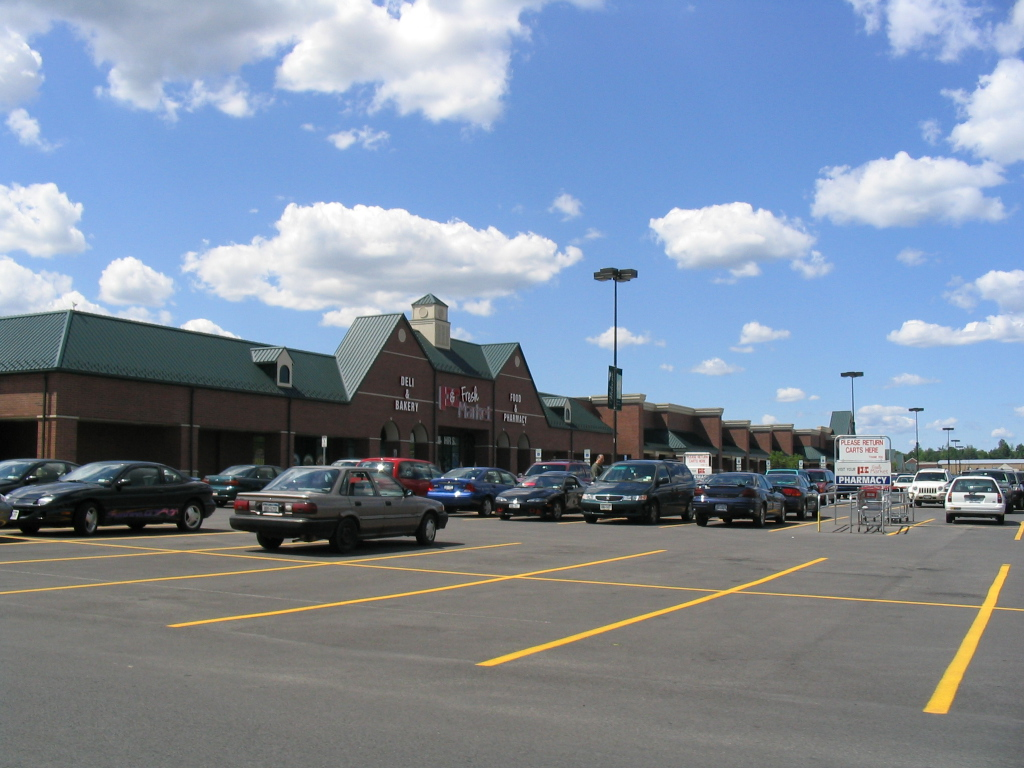
Fayetteville Towne Center Shopping Plaza has the greatest number of stores and restaurants in the Town of Manlius.

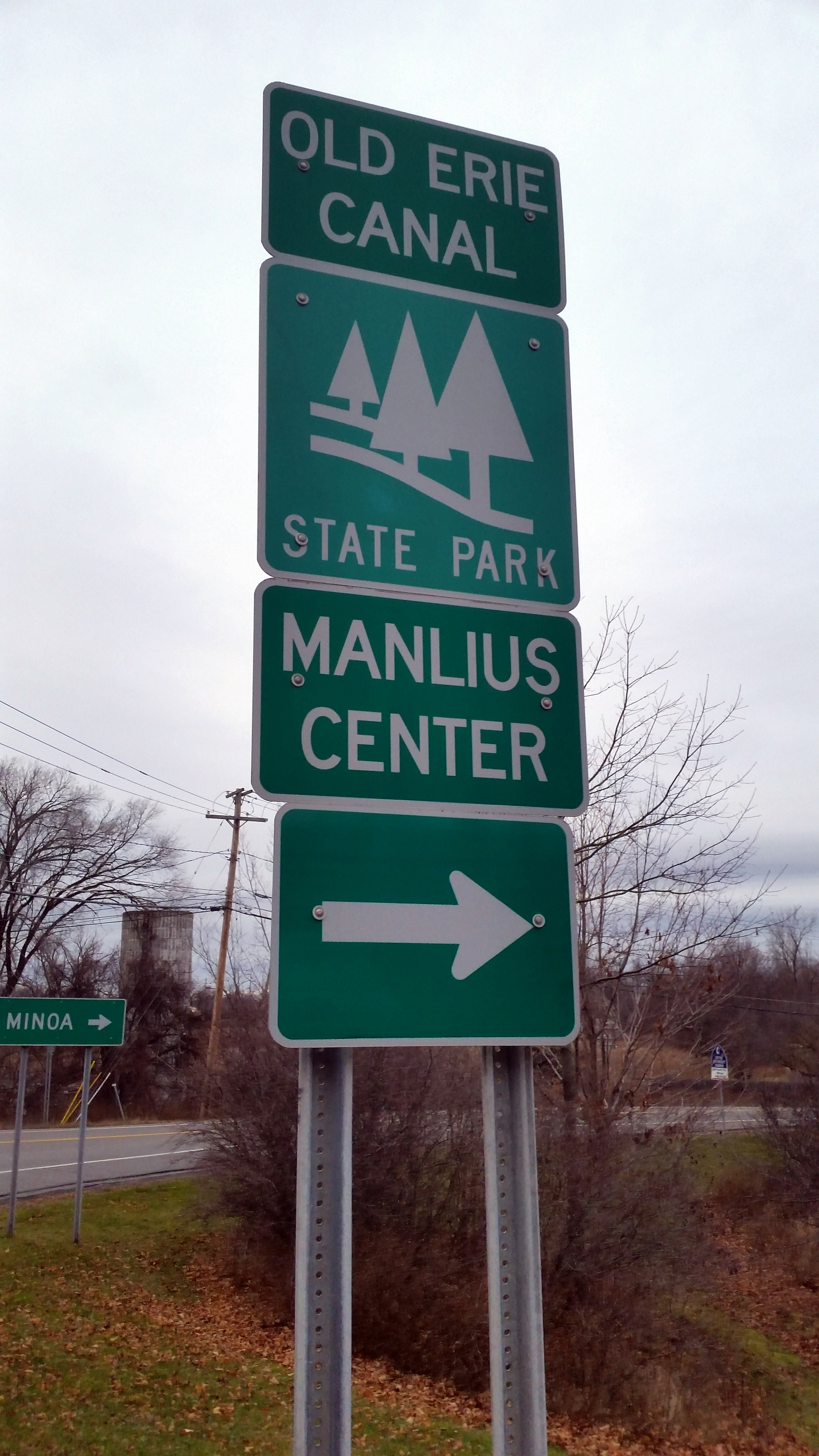
Manlius Center at the Old Erie Canal State Historic Park

- Eagle Village – A hamlet northeast of Manlius village on NY-173.
- Fayetteville – The Village of Fayetteville is by the western town line at the junction of NY-257 and NY-5.
- Fayetteville Towne Center –that was formerly Fayetteville Mall.
- Fillmore Corners – A hamlet west of Manlius village on NY-173.
- Fremont Heights – A suburban hamlet near the western town boundary, south of Minoa.
- Fremont Hills – A suburban hamlet near the western town line, south of Minoa.
- Gerardi's Swan Pond – A public pond located along Fayette Street.
- Green Lake – A lake located northeast of Fayetteville.
- Green Lakes State Park – A state park southeast of Minoa containing two unique lakes.
- High Bridge – A former hamlet at the west town line on NY-92.
- Kirkville – A hamlet east of Minoa.
- Limestone Creek
- Manlius – The Village of Manlius is near the southern town line at the junction of NY-92 and NY-173.
- Manlius Center – A location south of Minoa and north of Fayetteville at the junction of NY-257 and NY-290.
- Minoa – The Village of Minoa is in the northern part of the town.
- Mycenae – A hamlet near the eastern town line on NY-5.
- North Manlius – A hamlet by the northern town line and Chittenango Creek.
- Old Erie Canal State Historic Park
- Peck Hill – A hamlet by the eastern town line, east of Manlius village.
- Polkville – A location northwest of Minoa.
- Pompey – A hamlet in the western part of the town at US 20 and NY 91 (part of which is in Manlius).
- Saintsville – A hamlet in the northern part of the town, east of Minoa.
- Schepps Corner – A hamlet near the northern town line on NY-298.
- Snyders Crossing – A location between Minoa and Kirkville.

The three libraries located in the Town of Manlius—Village of Manlius Library, Fayetteville Free Library, and Village of Minoa Library—are branches of the Onondaga County Public Library.

== Notable people ==
The people below were born in or were residents of Manlius, New York

- Steve Altes, humorist and graphic novelist; co-recipient of the National Medal of Technology
- Laurie Halse Anderson, New York Times bestselling author and National Book Award finalist for the novel Speak
- William R. Gorsline, associate justice of the Colorado Territorial Supreme Court from 1866 to 1870
- Amos P. Granger, served as U.S. Congressman from 1855 to 1859
- Douglas Holtz-Eakin, former professor at Syracuse University and an adviser to the 2008 presidential campaign of John McCain
- James Caleb Jackson, nutritionist and the inventor of the first dry, whole grain breakfast cereal
- Greg Paulus, former basketball player at Duke University and starting quarterback at Syracuse University
- John J. Peck, soldier who fought in the Mexican–American War and American Civil War
- Don Savage, former professional basketball player for the Syracuse Nationals
- Thomas S. Szasz, libertarian critic of psychiatry and author of The Myth of Mental Illness
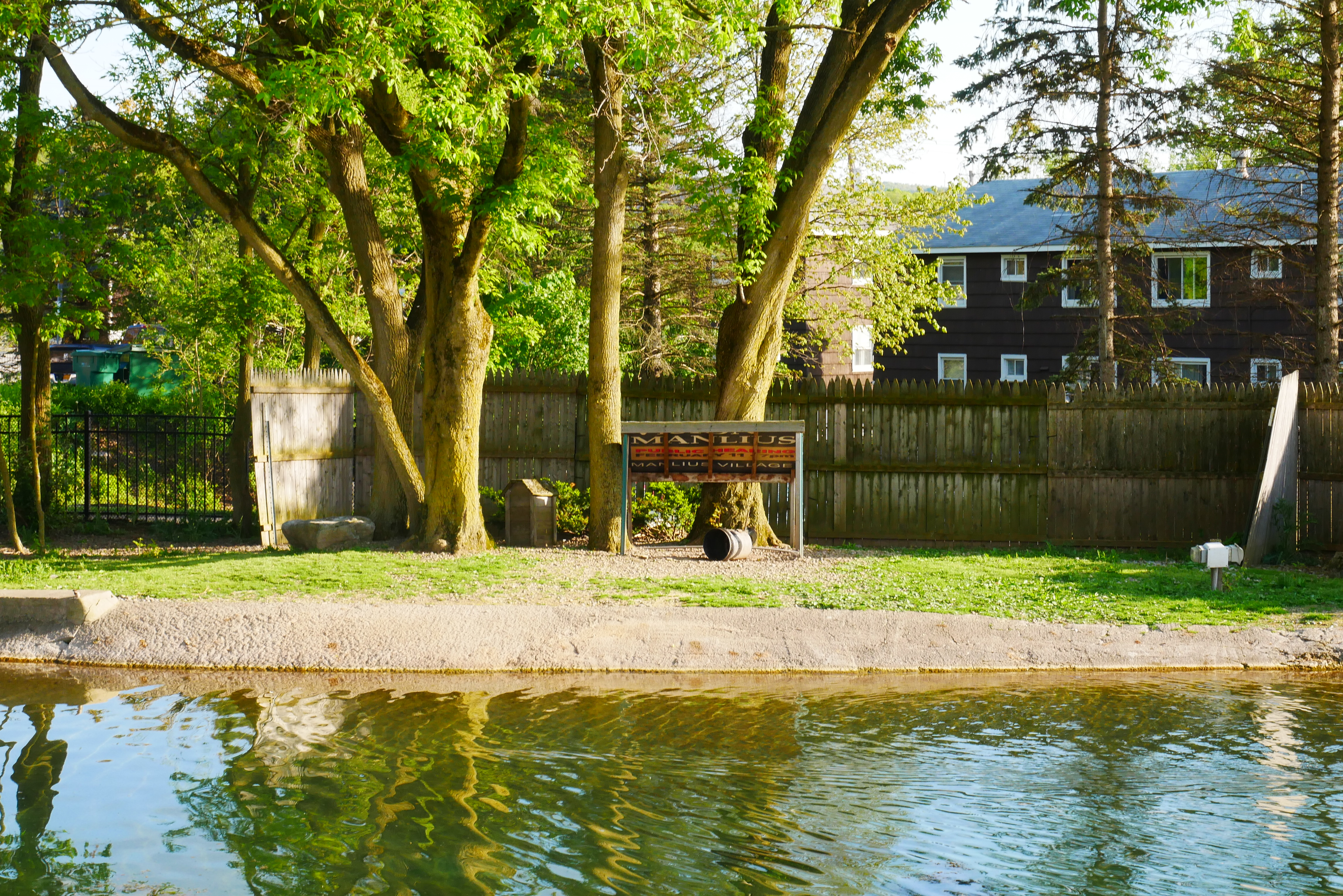
Manlius Swan Park

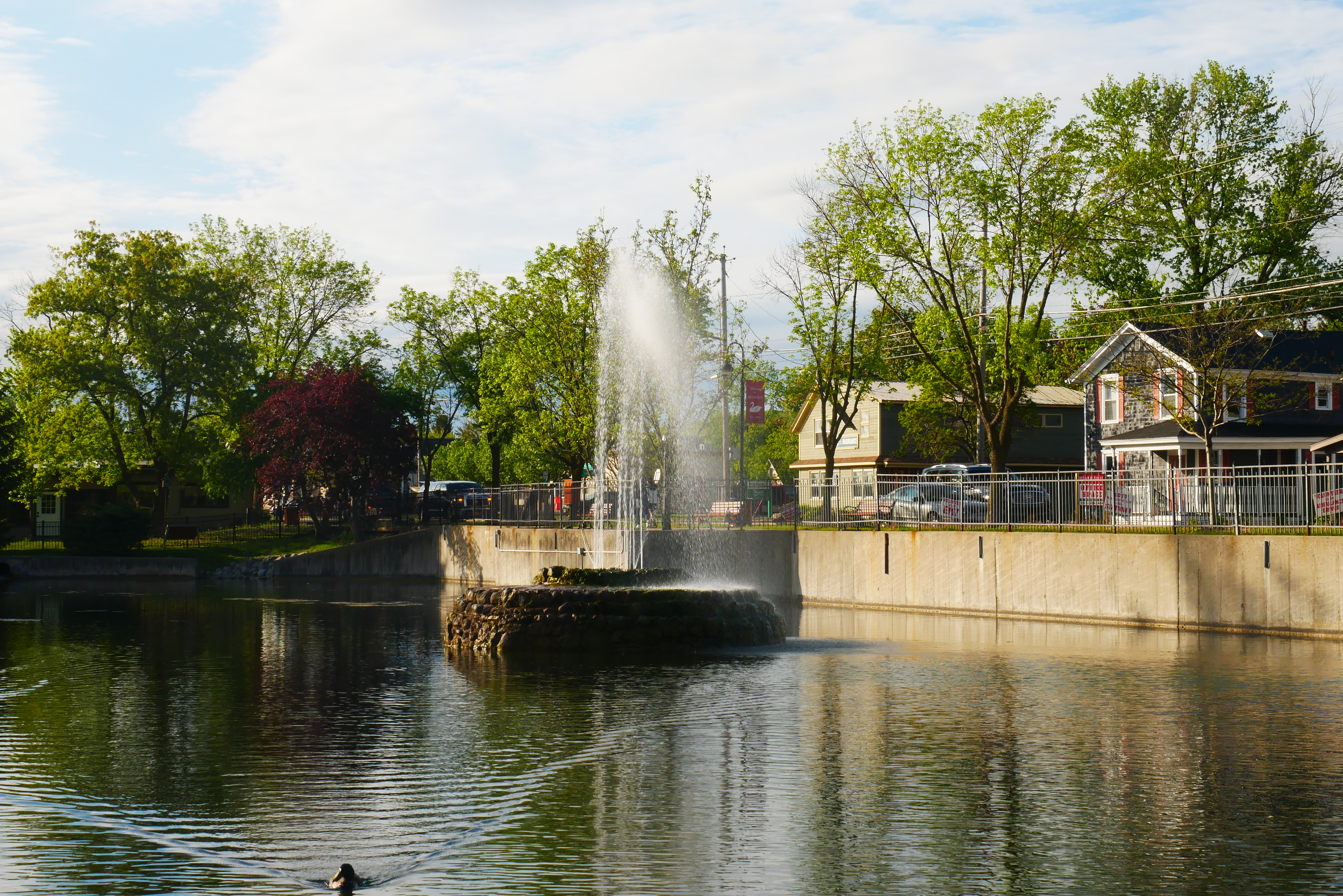
Manlius Swan Park Fountain
