= Manlius (village), New York =

Village in New York, United States

Manlius, New York
- Village
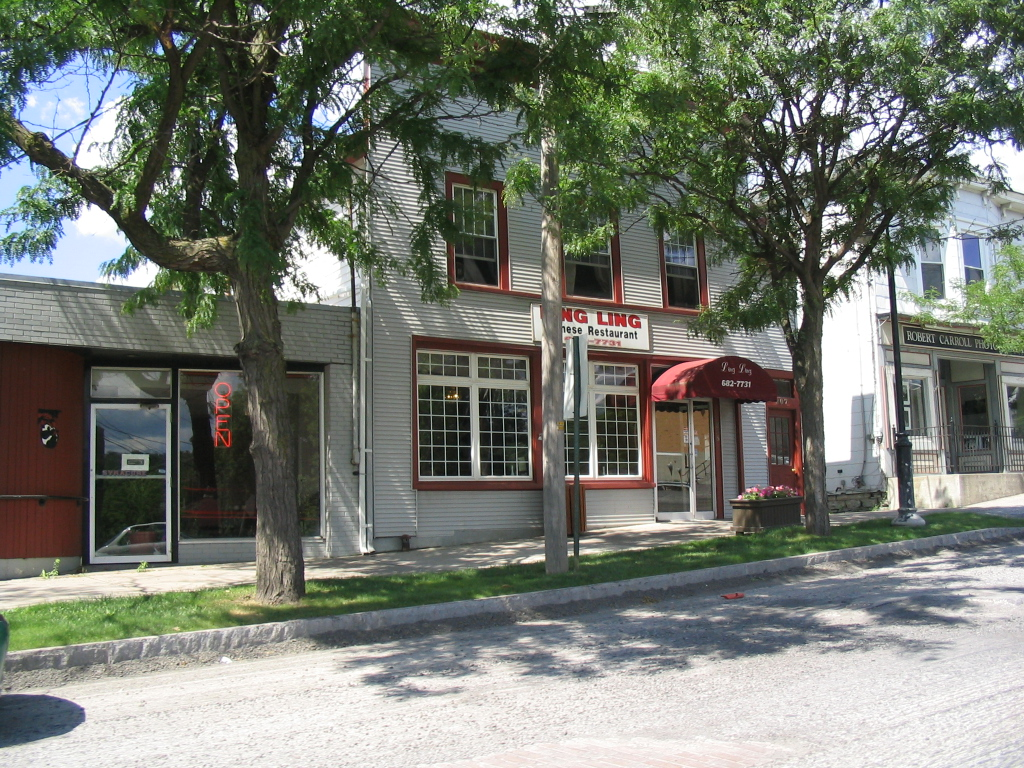
- The downtown of the village of Manlius

- Seal

- Location in Onondaga County and the state of New York.
- Coordinates: 43°0′8″N 75°58′44″W
- Country: United States
- State: New York
- County: Onondaga
- Village: 1813

Government
  - Mayor: Hank Chapman

Area
  - Total: 1.82 sq mi (4.72 km^{2})
  - Land: 1.82 sq mi (4.72 km^{2})
  - Water: 0 sq mi (0.00 km^{2})

Population (2020)
  - Total: 4,662
  - Density: 2,560/sq mi (988.6/km^{2})
- Time zone: UTC-5 (Eastern (EST))
  - Summer (DST): UTC-4 (EDT)
- ZIP code: 13104
- Area code: 315
- FIPS code: 36-45018
- GNIS feature ID: 2390961
- Website: manliusvillage.org

Manlius is a village in Onondaga County, New York, United States, and a southeast suburb of Syracuse. As of the 2020 census, the population was 4,662.

The Village of Manlius is located near the southern boundary of the Town of Manlius. An area of approximately three blocks within the village, running along Seneca Street and parallel to Pleasant Street, is listed on the National Register of Historic Places as the Manlius Village Historic District.

== History ==
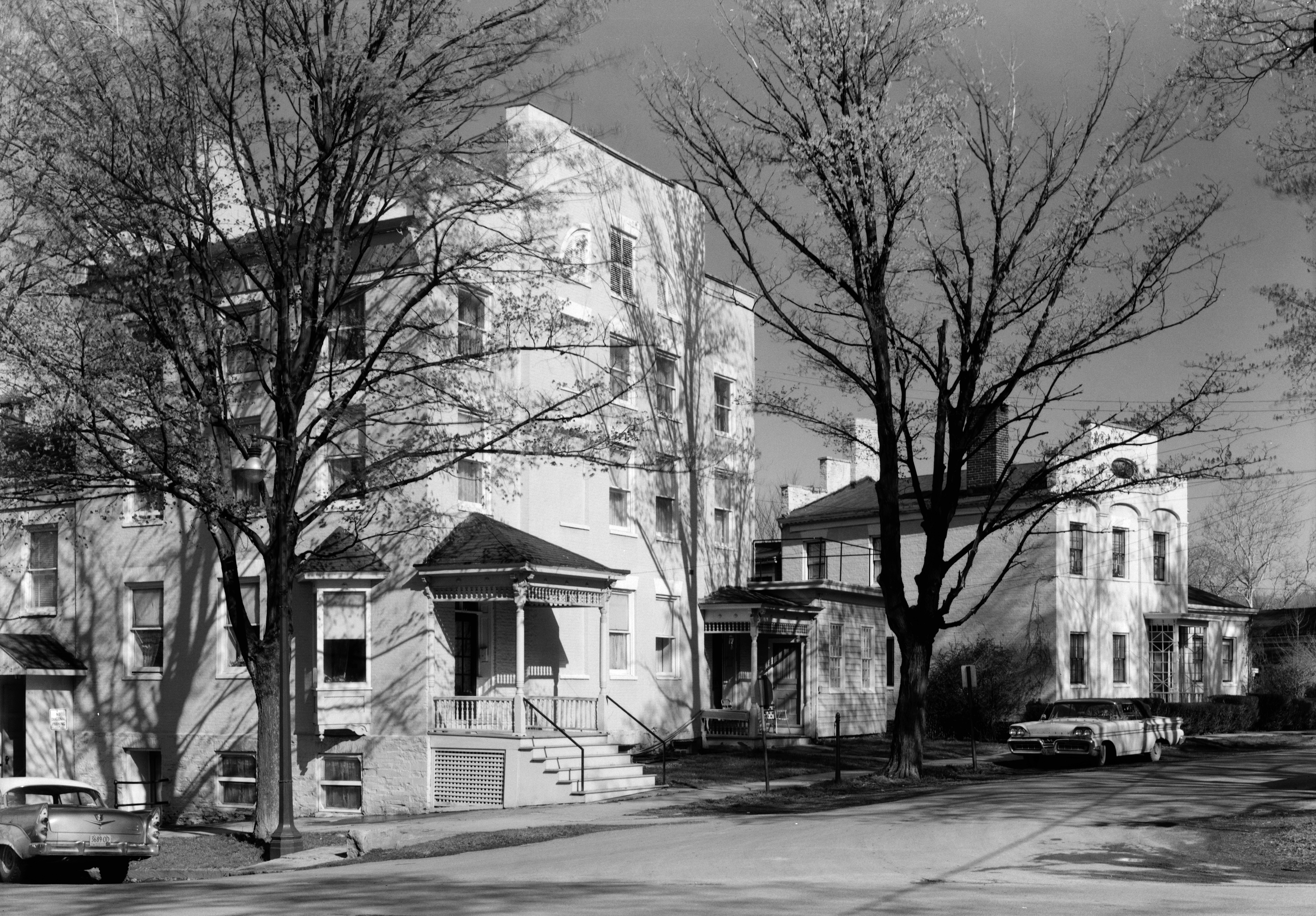
Smith Hall is a structure from 1813 to 1816 that served as a civic center. It was originally designed for commercial and residential use.

Originally one of the communities in the Central New York Military Tract (defined as Township Number Seven), the town of Manlius was settled in 1794. The village, however, was settled two years before by John A. Shaeffer, a German. The first schoolhouse in Manlius was erected in 1798. Built out of logs, it was located near a local resident's mill, named only as Mr. Costello. By 1801, the village began to grow, with six buildings and several amenities, including a blacksmith, store, doctor, lawyer, and a tavern. By the turn of the 19th century, there was also a post office defined as "Liberty Square". However, the name of Liberty Square was eventually renamed Manlius Square. After four years, Manlius had grown at a rapid rate, with the building of thirty houses. The growing village was defined as one of the most prominent business locations in Onondaga County. The community became the first village in the county in 1813.

Before the construction of the Erie Canal, Manlius was a large business point along the Cherry Valley Turnpike and Seneca Turnpikes. Since the traveling of goods passed through Manlius on these turnpikes, every other structure along the highways were taverns. Between Manlius and nearby Chittenango, New York, there were only about six or seven public buildings. Most of this stretch of the Seneca Turnpike is now New York State Route 173.

For twenty years, Manlius was the largest trade center in Onondaga County, with what is now Syracuse, a swamp at the time. Into the early 20th century, its St. John Military Academy was a respected private school for young men.

The Manlius Village Historic District was listed on the National Register of Historic Places in 1973.

== Geography ==
Manlius is located at 43°0′8″N 75°58′44″W (43.002266, -75.979068).

According to the United States Census Bureau, the village has a total area of 1.8 square miles (4.6 km^{2}), all land.

New York State Route 92 and New York State Route 173 intersect in Manlius.

== Demographics ==
Historical population
Census	Pop.	Note	%±
1860	873		—
1870	879		0.7%
1880	834		−5.1%
1890	942		12.9%
1900	1,219		29.4%
1910	1,314		7.8%
1920	1,296		−1.4%
1930	1,538		18.7%
1940	1,520		−1.2%
1950	1,742		14.6%
1960	1,997		14.6%
1970	4,295		115.1%
1980	5,241		22.0%
1990	4,764		−9.1%
2000	4,819		1.2%
2010	4,704		−2.4%
2020	4,662		−0.9%
U.S. Decennial Census

As of the census of 2000, there were 4,819 people, 2,056 households, and 1,293 families residing in the village. The population density was 2,705.8 inhabitants per square mile (1,044.7/km^{2}). There were 2,143 housing units at an average density of 1,203.3 per square mile (464.6/km^{2}). The racial makeup of the village was 93.07% White, 1.02% Black or African American, 0.23% Native American, 4.17% Asian, 0.21% from other races, and 1.31% from two or more races. Hispanic or Latino of any race were 1.31% of the population.

There were 2,056 households, out of which 32.6% had children under the age of 18 living with them, 51.8% were married couples living together, 9.0% had a female householder with no husband present, and 37.1% were non-families. 33.2% of all households were made up of individuals, and 15.6% had someone living alone who was 65 years of age or older. The average household size was 2.33 and the average family size was 3.00.

In the village, the population was spread out, with 26.7% under the age of 18, 4.8% from 18 to 24, 27.7% from 25 to 44, 24.5% from 45 to 64, and 16.3% who were 65 years of age or older. The median age was 39 years. For every 100 females, there were 87.2 males. For every 100 females age 18 and over, there were 79.8 males.

The median income for a household in the village was $45,492, and the median income for a family was $65,080. Males had a median income of $49,600 versus $29,118 for females. The per capita income for the village was $26,434. About 3.2% of families and 6.4% of the population were below the poverty line, including 10.5% of those under age 18 and 7.2% of those age 65 or over.

== Education ==
Public K–12 education is served by the Fayetteville-Manlius Central School District.

== Parks ==
Manlius has several parks within the village, including Mill Run Park (the largest) and Swan Pond, located near the public library.
