= County Route 41 (Onondaga County, New York) =

Highway in Onondaga County, New York

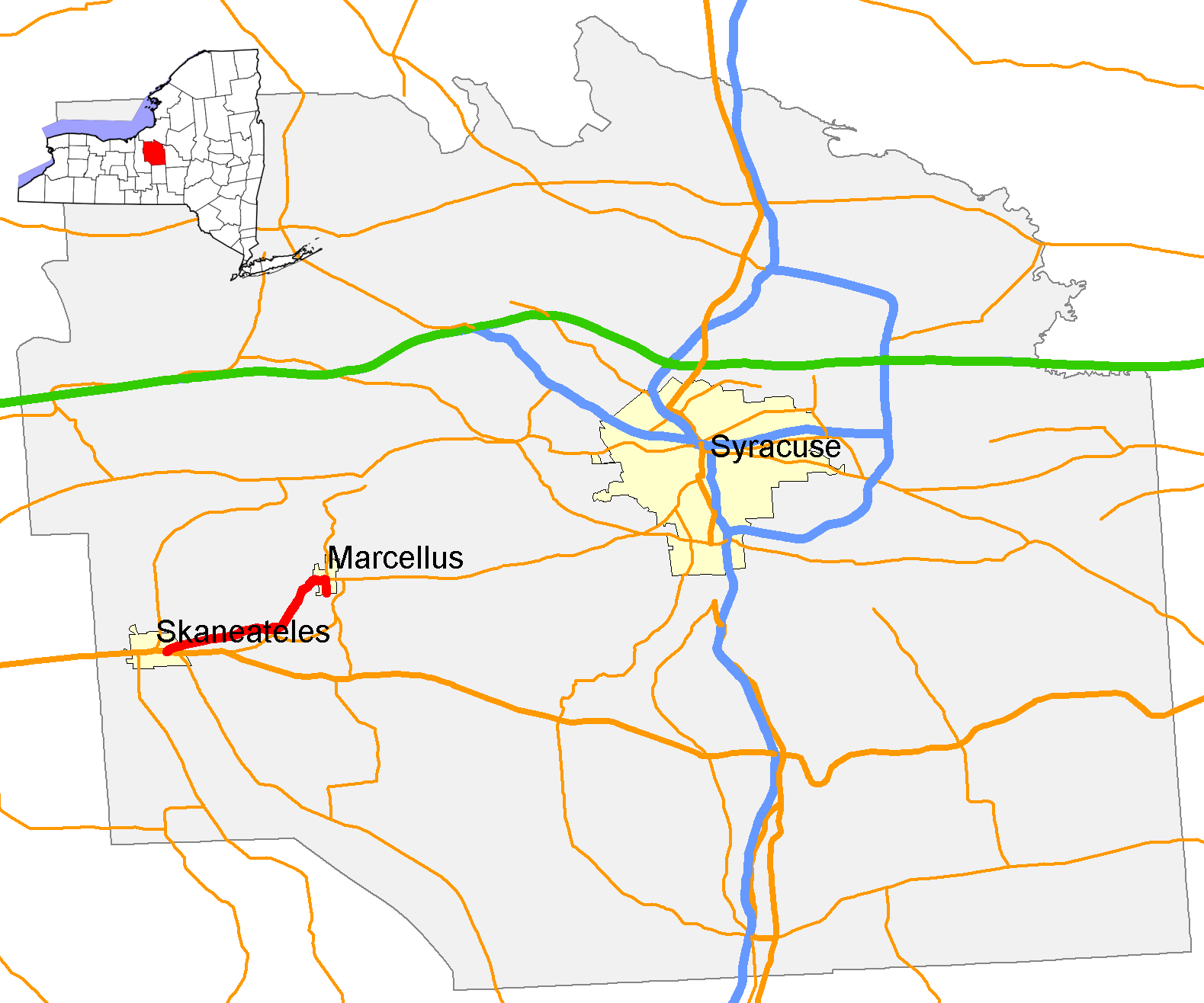

Route information
- Maintained by Onondaga County Highway Department
- Length: 6.20 mi (9.98 km)
- Existed: by 1989–present

Major junctions
- South end: US 20 in Skaneateles
- CR 133 (Old Seneca Turnpike) in Marcellus; Old NY 174 in Marcellus
- North end: CR 83 / CR 150 in Marcellus

Location
- Country: United States
- State: New York
- County: Onondaga

Highway system
- County routes in New York; County Routes in Onondaga County

County Route 41 (CR 41) in Onondaga County, New York is a 6.20-mile (9.98 km) highway in the Finger Lakes towns of Skaneateles and Marcellus. The route is unsigned, like most of Onondaga County's routes, serving as a connector between the villages. The route begins at an intersection with U.S. Route 20 (US 20) in Skaneateles and heads northeast for most of its length. Route 41 does not intersect with another state-maintained highway, but does follow the former alignment of two. The highway ends at an intersection with CR 83 (South Street) and CR 150 (Platt Road).

Route 41 was once part of a realignment of a 19th-century turnpike, the Seneca Turnpike. Being a newer alignment, the signs along the highway read "New Seneca Turnpike". The route, when the 1930 New York State Route renumbering occurred, was designated as part of New York State Route 175 (NY 175) from US 20 to NY 174, which is now part of CR 41. The highway then followed an older alignment of Route 174 southward, out of Marcellus. Route 175 was decommissioned and realigned several times along that alignment, and the Route 174 alignment came in the 1970s. By 1989, Route 41 was assigned along its entire alignment.

== Route description ==
CR 41 begins at an intersection with US 20 (East Genesee Street) in the village of Skaneateles. Route 41 heads to the northeast through the densely populated community, passing homes and trees. The highway then intersects with the northern terminus of East Lake Street, the continuation of NY 41. The county route, however, continues to the northeast, leaving the village portion of Skaneateles at an intersection with Highland Avenue, losing its Onondaga Street moniker. The highway, now known as the New Seneca Turnpike, parallels US 20 in a less dense area of Skaneateles.

The highway continues, leaving Skaneateles for the town of Marcellus. After a while, the dense housing becomes farmland and fields, with the highway continuing towards downtown Marcellus. However, as the route progresses farther, this reverts itself, and houses follow along the highway once again. Route 41 then intersects with Gully Road and the Old Seneca Turnpike, a realignment of itself. The real "Old Seneca Turnpike" is intersected farther north. After passing a large farm, Route 41 intersects with the northern terminus of CR 259A (Richard Road).

Route 41 passes to the south of a pond, making a swing to the north. The route then makes a swing to the east, and soon after a straight path to the northeast. The highway intersects with CR 211A (Lawrence Road), which heads eastward towards NY 174. After the county route, the population around Route 41 quickly dips, and fields surround the highway. A local road, CR 202 (Murphy Road), starts to the west after a short distance. The northeast curving begins to straighten into a northward track, until intersecting with the southern terminus of CR 236 (Gypsy Road). A short distance after, Route 41 intersects with CR 133, the old alignment of the Seneca Turnpike, and the two highways merge.

The county highway then follows the Old Seneca Turnpike along East Main Street, entering the village of Marcellus. Route 41 then makes a turn to the south along an old alignment of NY 174. The population becomes dense once again, as Route 41 follows South Street towards its eastern terminus. Paralleling Marcellus County Park, the highway continues southward. Route 41 finally terminates at an intersection with CR 83 (South Street) and CR 150 (Platt Road). South Street continues towards an intersection with NY 174 and NY 175.

== History ==
=== Old roads ===
Route 41 from US 20 to South Street, is a realignment of the Seneca Turnpike, which was assigned in 1800. Originally chartered as Genesee Road, the Seneca Turnpike consisted of a highway from Canandaigua to Utica. The turnpike had a long track in Onondaga County, running along CR 133, NY 174, NY 175, NY 173, and NY 92. The turnpike was realigned in 1806 onto CR 41 instead of CR 133. After CR 41, it continued along the same track. The Seneca Turnpike Corporation, which maintained the turnpike, closed its doors in 1852. As of 2008, County Routes 41 and 133 still retain the Seneca Turnpike moniker.

=== Designation ===
In 1930, during a massive State Route renumbering, the Skaneateles – South Street alignment of CR 41 was assigned as NY 175. The rest was portioned as an alignment of NY 174. The NY 174 alignment remained intact for many years, while NY 175 went through several different alignments. NY 175 was truncated off the CR 41 alignment by 1936, until being realigned back onto the highway in the 1960s. However, this time, the highway was maintained by the Onondaga County Department of Transportation. NY 175 was realigned by 1989 onto CR 73 (the Lee Mulroy Highway) south of CR 41. The alignment of CR 41 in Marcellus was established as a county highway in the 1970s and 1980s, when NY 174 was realigned onto a different highway.

== Major intersections ==
The entire route is in Onondaga County.

Location	mi	km	Destinations	Notes
Village of Skaneateles	0.00	0.00	US 20 (Genesee Street)	
Village of Marcellus	5.56	8.95	Main Street	Former routing of NY 175
Village of Marcellus	6.20	9.98	South Street (CR 83) / Platt Road (CR 150)	Former routing of NY 174
1.000 mi = 1.609 km; 1.000 km = 0.621 mi

== See also ==
- County Route 236 (Onondaga County, New York)
- Seneca Turnpike
