= New York State Route 174 =

State highway in Onondaga County, New York, US

New York State Route 174
- NY 174 highlighted in red

Route information
- Maintained by NYSDOT and Onondaga County
- Length: 16.70 mi (26.88 km)
- Existed: 1930–present

Major junctions
- South end: NY 41 in Spafford
- US 20 in Marcellus
- North end: NY 5 in Camillus

Location
- Country: United States
- State: New York
- Counties: Onondaga

Highway system
- New York Highways; Interstate; US; State; Reference; Parkways
| ← NY 173 | → NY 175 |

New York State Route 174 (NY 174) is a state highway in Onondaga County, located in Central New York, in the United States. The highway is 16.7 miles (26.9 km) long and passes through mostly rural regions. Route 174 begins at an intersection with NY 41 in Borodino, a hamlet of Spafford. It heads generally northward for most of its length, except for short distances in the villages of Marcellus and Camillus. The route ends at a junction with NY 5 west of Camillus, at the west end of the Route 5 Camillus bypass. Route 174 is located along a large mapped sedimentary bedrock unit, known as the Marcellus Formation. The formation is named for an outcrop found near the town of Marcellus, New York, during a geological survey in 1839.

The road was first constructed in the early 19th century following the path of Nine Mile Creek, which connected several early settlements in Central New York. The northern half of the route, between the villages of Marcellus and Camillus, was later improved as a plank road in 1855 by a private corporation that collected tolls from travelers on the road. The state took over the maintenance of the road by the beginning of the 20th century. The former plank road and an extension south to Otisco Lake and southwest to Skaneateles Lake was first designated as Route 174 in the 1930 state highway renumbering. Since then, several minor realignments have been made in the areas of the villages of Marcellus and Camillus to accommodate newly built bypasses.

== Route description ==
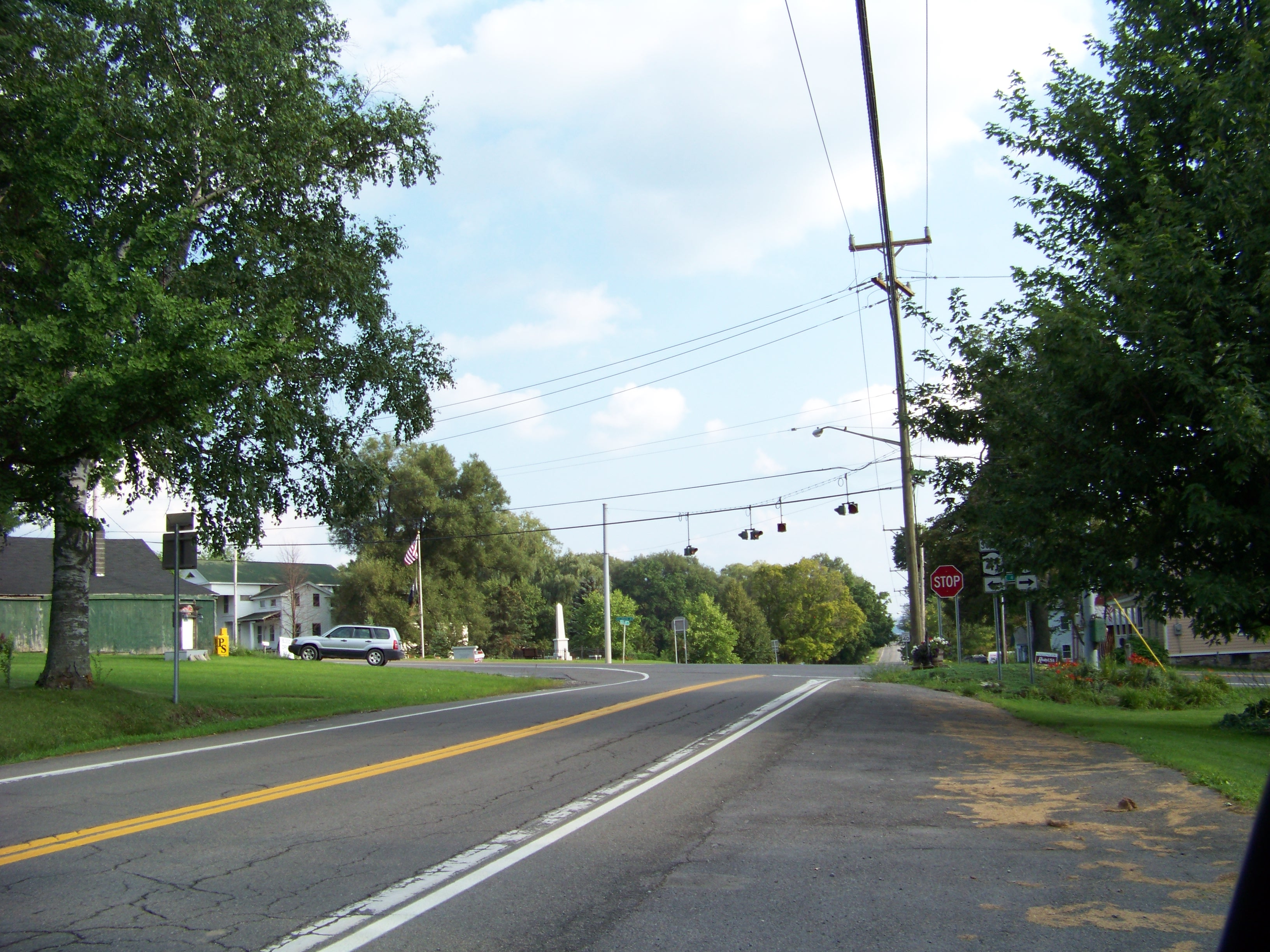
NY 174's southern terminus at NY 41

NY 174 begins its 16-mile (26 km) route through Onondaga County at an intersection with NY 41 in the hamlet of Borodino, on the shores of Skaneateles Lake. The road heads north, passing to the east of Hardscrabble Point, to an intersection with Eibert Road (County Route 131 or CR 131) where it turns east. The highway then heads eastward for about a mile (1.6 km) to a turn along the shore of Otisco Lake. It follows the shoreline of the lake northward into the town of Marcellus, soon entering the hamlet of Marietta. North of Marietta, the lake narrows into the Nine Mile Creek, which parallels NY 174 for the rest of the highway's length.

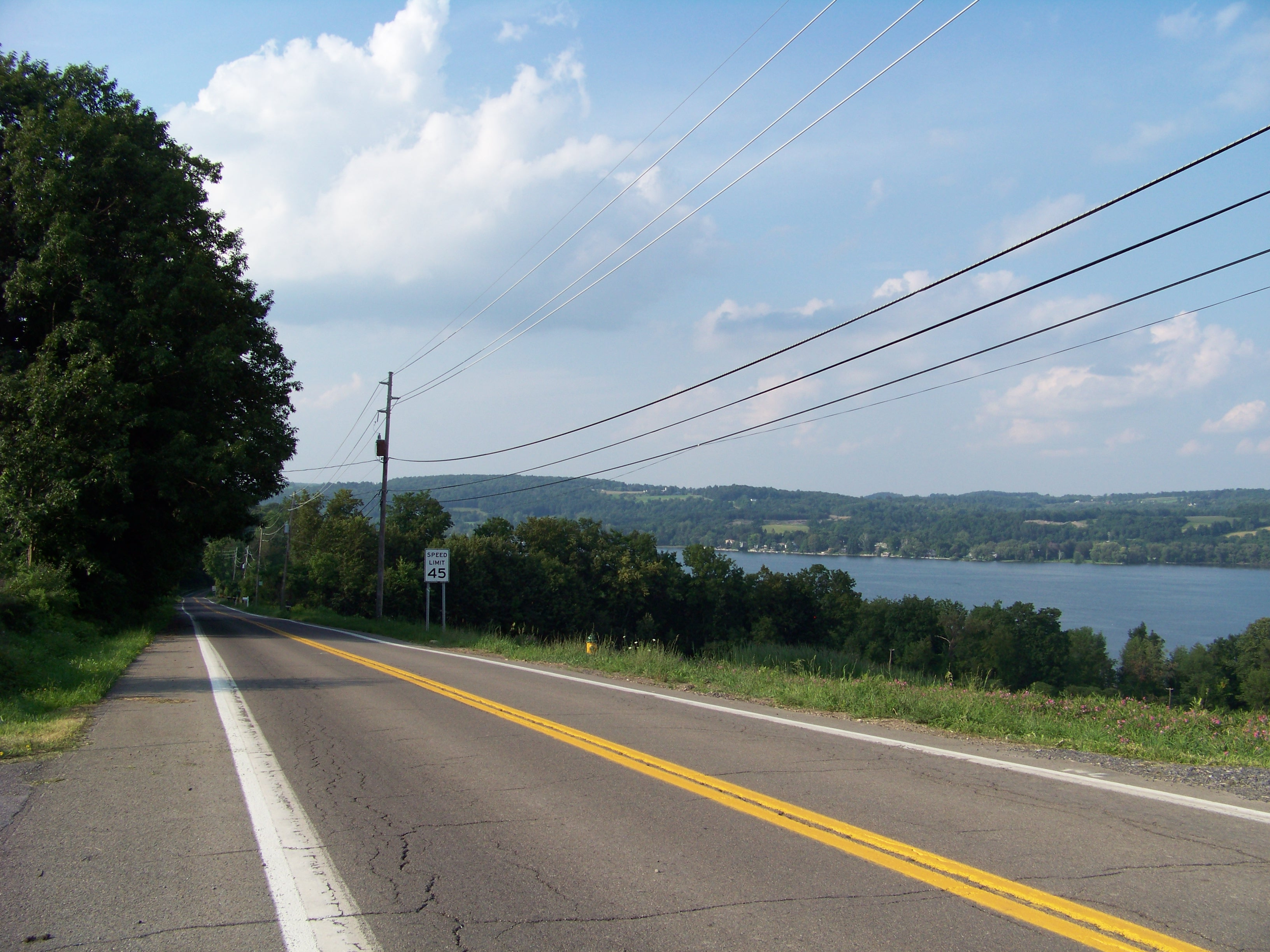
NY 174 with Otisco Lake in view

Within the town of Marcellus, NY 174 intersects and becomes concurrent with U.S. Route 20 (US 20) for about 0.3 miles (0.5 km) until Sevier Road. NY 174 continues north along Sevier Road, still paralleling the creek, towards the village of Marcellus. South of the village line, NY 175 joins NY 174 and the two routes are concurrent for about 2 miles (3 km). The two roads go around the southeast border of the village, passing by the county park, then split in different directions just east of the village. Route 175 turns to the east while NY 174 turns to the west along the West Seneca Turnpike, entering the village of Marcellus.

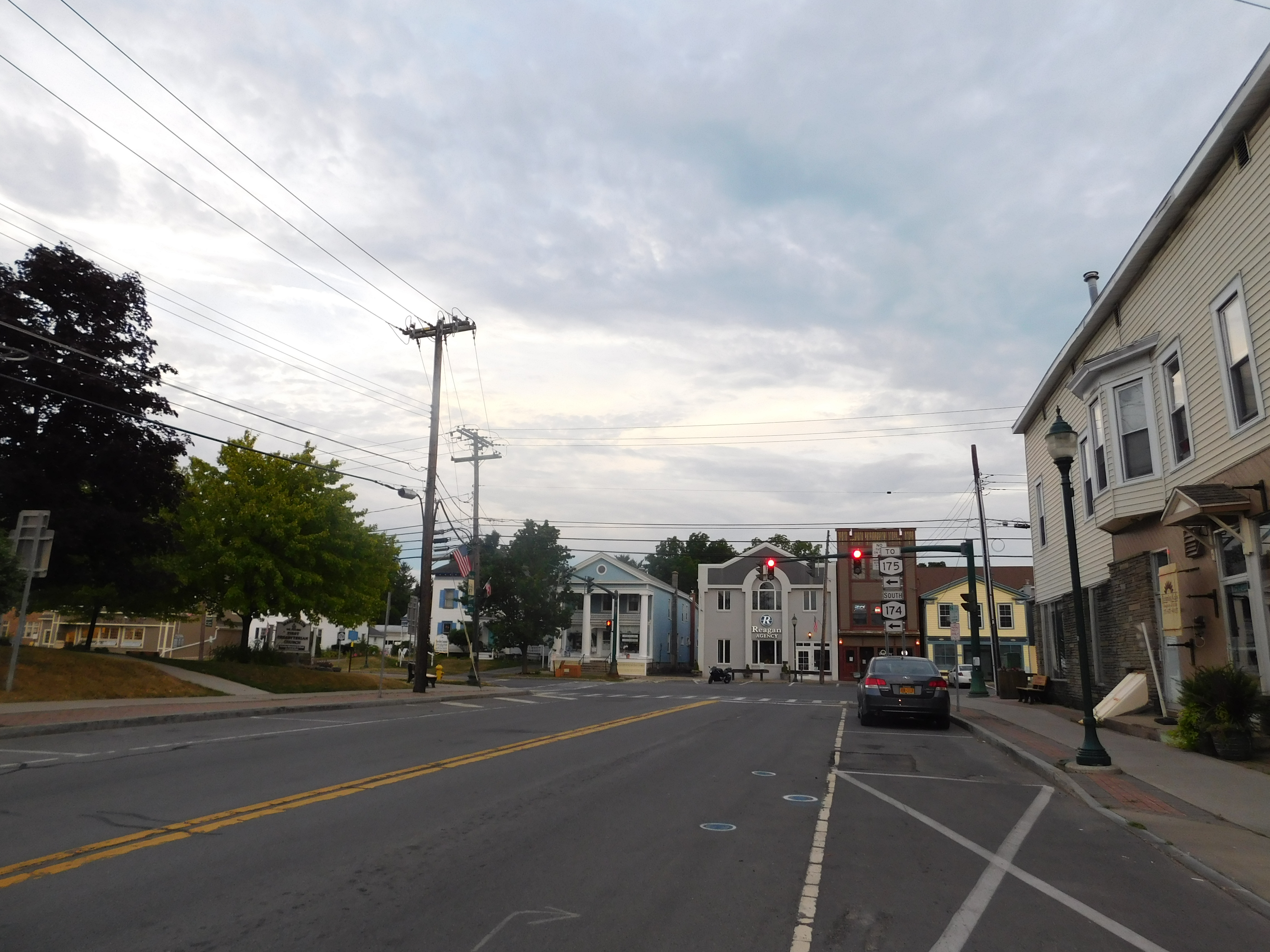
NY 174 in Marcellus, approaching NY 175

NY 174 passes through the village center then turns north along North Street and heads out of the village, turning northward through the hamlet of Marcellus Falls. After Marcellus, the land around the route becomes more developed with residential areas becoming more common. About 0.3-mile (0.5 km) north of Marcellus, NY 174 crosses Nine Mile Creek; the bridge itself is designated as NY 174X, which is an internal designation used by NYSDOT and not signed as such.

The road continues north, still paralleling the Nine Mile Creek, into the town of Camillus. In Bennetts Corners, NY 174 intersects with Forward Road (unsigned NY 931F), a connector road to NY 321, then changes direction to head northeast. The road passes by Nose Hill before entering the village of Camillus. In the village center, NY 174 makes a sharp turn to the west onto West Genesee Street, where it comes to an end just west of the village line at a junction with NY 5 (where its freeway begins) that includes a jughandle, a slip road onto the freeway. NY 174 is located along a geological feature known as a mapped sedimentary bedrock unit, known as the Marcellus Formation. The formation is named for an outcrop found near the town of Marcellus, New York, during a geological survey in 1839.

== History ==
=== Old roads ===
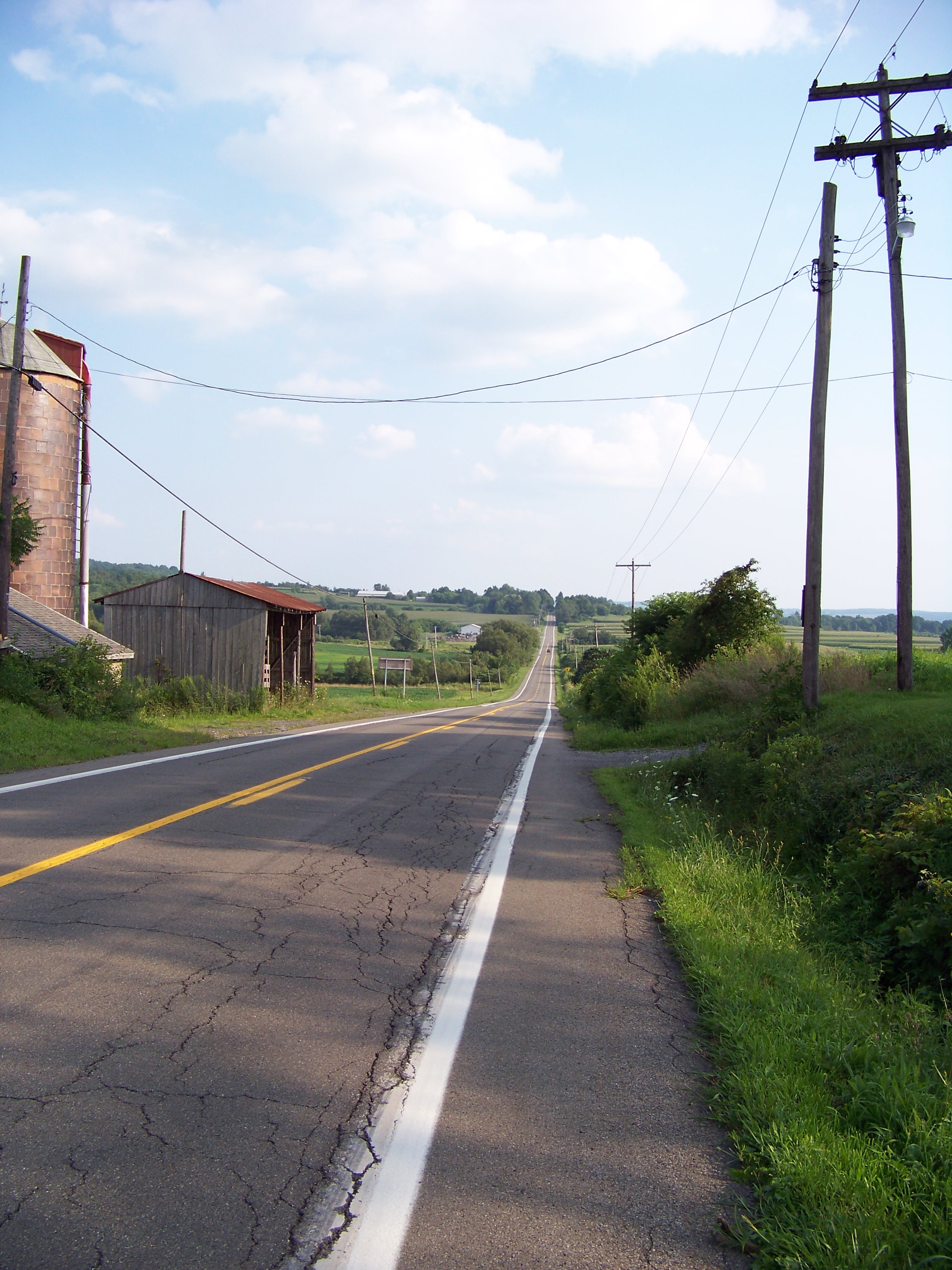
NY 174 southbound (south of US 20)

The village of Marcellus was first settled in 1794 at the intersection of two transportation routes: an old Iroquois trail running east–west (later to become the Seneca Turnpike) and the north–south Nine Mile Creek. At the beginning of the 19th century, land travel along the Nine Mile Creek was very difficult and most travel between Marcellus and the settlements along Onondaga Lake was by water. In 1831 the New York State Legislature authorized the construction of a road to follow Nine Mile Creek from Marcellus towards the town of Salina at Onondaga Lake.

In 1855, the road from Marcellus to Camillus along the Nine Mile Creek route was improved by the Camillus and Marcellus Plank Road Company, which was first chartered in 1849, and in 1853 were authorized to collect tolls from travelers using the road. The improvement of the road led to it becoming a stagecoach route in the middle of the 19th century. The former plank road alignment in the village of Marcellus (North Street) and the southward continuation along Cherry Street (now South Street) was paved in 1911 as part of the construction of a new state highway that would pass through the town.

=== Designation ===
The route from Marcellus (at US 20) to Camillus was designated as NY 174 in the 1930 renumbering of state highways in New York. At the time, the segment of modern NY 174 from Otisco Valley Road (south of US 20) to Borodino was designated as NY 337 while NY 174 followed Otisco Valley and Oak Hill Roads southeast to an intersection with NY 80 in Otisco. NY 174 was truncated northwestward c. 1932 to begin at US 20 south of Marcellus. The portion of its former routing between US 20 and NY 337 became a northward extension of NY 337. This change was short-lived as NY 337 was supplanted by an extended NY 174 by the following year. The northernmost portion of NY 174 from Forward Road to NY 5 in Camillus village was originally designated as part of NY 26 in 1924. The route began in Ithaca and ended in Syracuse. The portion of NY 26 between the villages of Skaneateles and Camillus became NY 321 as part of the 1930 renumbering, resulting in an overlap with NY 174 from Forward Road to NY 5. NY 321 has since been relocated to the west on a county road, and Forward Road is now NY 931F, an unsigned, state-maintained highway known as a reference route.

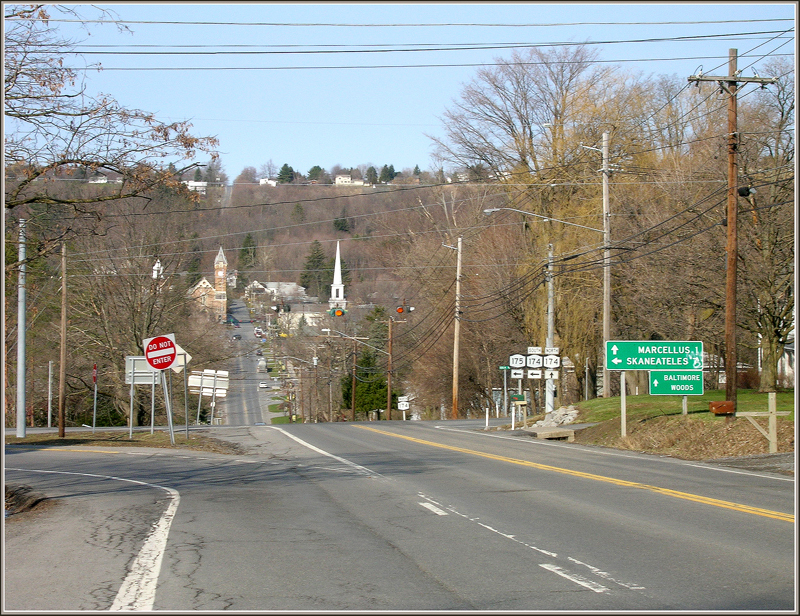
Current view of NY 174 and NY 175 where NY 20N once existed

NY 20N was designated c. 1938 as a northerly alternate route of US 20 between Skaneateles and Cazenovia. It utilized existing numbered roads, including NY 174 from US 20 in Skaneateles north to Marcellus, where it turned eastward to follow NY 175. The NY 20N designation was removed c. 1962.

NY 174 has also had several minor realignments. After Route 5 was realigned onto a new expressway from Camillus to Fairmount, NY 174 was extended on its northern end to meet the west end of the bypass in Camillus. The new alignment makes a sharp hook west along the former Route 5. NY 174 has also been relocated onto a southeastern bypass around the village of Marcellus that also carries Route 175. Originally, NY 174 and 175 entered the village along South Street. The routes were realigned to the bypass between 1976 and 1989. NY 174 now enters downtown Marcellus using several blocks of the historic Seneca Turnpike between the old and new alignments. This section of the route is maintained by Onondaga County as CR 41. The former South Street alignment has been redesignated as CR 83.

In April 2008, the New York State Senate introduced and passed a bill to rename part of NY 174 as the "Father Joseph Champlin Memorial Highway". This would include the portion of the highway from the Camillus town line to Route 5. Also starting in 2008, the New York State Department of Transportation began a rehabilitation project on NY 174. The Marcellus Falls bridge over Nine Mile Creek, also known as NY 174X, is closed off for a complete rehabilitation and a detour has been placed around it. Construction is reduced to one lane between Main Street and Scotch Hill Road and will continue until June 24, 2008. On November 21, 2008, the bridge was re-opened and the construction completed.

== Major intersections ==
The entire route is in Onondaga County.

| Location | mi | km | Destinations | Notes |
|---|---|---|---|---|
| Spafford | 0.00 | 0.00 | NY 41 – Spafford, Cortland, Skaneateles | Southern terminus, Hamlet of Borodino |
| Town of Marcellus | 6.46 | 10.40 | US 20 west – Skaneateles | Western terminus of US 20 / NY 174 overlap |
| Town of Marcellus | 6.77 | 10.90 | US 20 east – Lafayette | Eastern terminus of US 20 / NY 174 overlap |
| Town of Marcellus | 9.09 | 14.63 | NY 175 west – Skaneateles | Southern terminus of NY 174 / NY 175 overlap |
| Town of Marcellus | 10.60 | 17.06 | NY 175 east – Syracuse | Northern terminus of NY 174 / NY 175 overlap |
| Town of Camillus | 13.75 | 22.13 | Forward Road (NY 931F) – Skaneateles | Former routing of NY 321; eastern terminus of unsigned NY 931F; hamlet of Martisco |
| Village of Camillus | 15.98 | 25.72 | To Genesee Street east / NY 5 – Syracuse | Former NY 5 east |
| Town of Camillus | 16.70 | 26.88 | NY 5 – Auburn | Northern terminus, interchange |
1.000 mi = 1.609 km; 1.000 km = 0.621 mi: Concurrency terminus

== See also ==
- List of county routes in Onondaga County, New York
