= List of county routes in Onondaga County, New York =

County routes in Onondaga County, New York, are not signed in any form, serving as little more than references for inventory purposes. One county route, County Route 91 (CR 91), has route markers posted along its length; however, the signs display the number "57" for New York State Route 57 (NY 57), the road's former designation. Several route numbers comprise multiple highways, which do not always connect to one another.

== Routes ==
Number	Length (mi)	Length (km)	Southern or western terminus	Northern or eastern terminus	Local names	Formed	Removed	Notes
CR 1	7.84	12.62	US 20 / CR 3	CR 2 at De Witt town line	Apulia Road in LaFayette	—	—	
CR 1A	0.63	1.01	Dead end	CR 1	Cook Farms Road in LaFayette	—	—	
CR 2	0.64	1.03	CR 1 at LaFayette town line	NY 173	Apulia Road in De Witt	—	—	
CR 3	4.32	6.95	NY 80 in Fabius	US 20 / CR 1 in LaFayette	Apulia Road	—	—	
CR 5	9.88	15.90	NY 80 / CR 12 in Pompey	NY 92 in Pompey	Oran Delphi Road	—	—	Includes two spurs along Oran Gulf and Indian Hill roads near north end
CR 6	5.36	8.63	NY 173	Syracuse city line	North Street and Jamesville Toll, Rams Gulch, Old School House, Nottingham, Tecumseh, and Kimber roads in De Witt	—	—	Discontinuous at I-481
CR 7	2.34	3.77	CR 6	NY 92	Jamesville Road in De Witt	—	—	
CR 8	0.22	0.35	NY 92	CR 109	Highbridge Road in Manlius	—	—	
CR 9	5.12	8.24	US 20 in Pompey	NY 173 in Manlius	Watervale Road	—	—	
CR 10	4.96	7.98	US 20 / CR 11 in Pompey	NY 92 in Manlius	Pompey Center Road	—	—	
CR 11	6.17	9.93	NY 80 in Fabius	US 20 / CR 10 in Pompey	Pompey Center Road	—	—	
CR 12	3.25	5.23	Madison County line (CR 55)	NY 80 / CR 5	DeRuyter Road in Fabius	—	—	
CR 13	2.92	4.70	Carrier Circle in De Witt	CR 14 / CR 82 / CR 214 in Cicero	Thompson Road	—	—	Discontinuous between CR 71 and CR 19
CR 14	5.90	9.50	CR 13 / CR 82 / CR 214 NY 31 / CR 214	NY 31 Lake Shore Road	Thompson Road in Cicero Cicero Center Road in Cicero	—	—	
CR 15	0.33	0.53	CR 123	CR 208	Lake Shore Road in Cicero	—	—	
CR 16	2.59	4.17	US 11 / CR 17	Weaver Road	Mud Mill Road in Cicero	—	—	
CR 17	1.91	3.07	CR 49 / CR 50 in Clay	US 11 / CR 16 in Cicero	Mud Mill Road Extension	—	—	
CR 18	3.12	5.02	CR 19 / CR 251 in Cicero	NY 298 in Cicero	East Taft Road	—	—	
CR 19	4.39	7.07	US 11 / CR 48 in North Syracuse	CR 18 / CR 251 in Cicero	East Taft Road	—	—	
CR 20	0.57	0.92	CR 19	North Syracuse village line	Church Street in Cicero	—	—	
CR 21	2.50	4.02	NY 174 / CR 131 in Spafford	CR 27 in Marcellus	Rose Hill Road	—	—	
CR 22	4.30	6.92	Skaneateles village in Skaneateles	CR 122 / CR 271 in Elbridge	Jordan Road	—	—	
CR 23	4.68	7.53	NY 80	CR 24 / CR 124	Oak Hill Road in Otisco	—	—	
CR 24	8.77	14.11	—	—		—	—	
CR 25	3.65	5.87	Cortland County line (CR 102)	NY 41	Coldbrook Road in Spafford	—	—	
CR 26	7.11	11.44	CR 25	NY 174	Willowdale Road in Spafford	—	—	
CR 27	4.24	6.82	NY 41 in Marcellus	NY 174 in Marcellus	Coon Hill and Rose Hill roads	—	—	
CR 28	1.71	2.75	CR 106 (seg. 1) / CR 118 (seg. 1) / CR 194 CR 28 (segment 1)	NY 48 Dead end at I-690 exit 3	Jones Road in Van Buren Stiles Road in Van Buren	—	—	
CR 29	5.56	8.95	CR 30 / CR 180	Oswego County line	West Bridge Street in Lysander	—	—	Includes two spurs off CR 37 (Old Lamson Road and West Bridge Street) near east end
CR 30	6.76	10.88	NY 370 / CR 32	CR 29 / CR 180	Plainville and Lamson roads in Lysander	—	—	
CR 31	3.69	5.94	CR 36 / CR 138	Baldwinsville village line	Newport Road and Canton Street in Van Buren	—	—	
CR 32	4.62	7.44	CR 84 in Elbridge	NY 370 / CR 30 in Lysander	Plainville Road	—	—	
CR 33	1.49	2.40	CR 30 / CR 34	Oswego County line (CR 8)	Plainville Road in Lysander	—	—	
CR 34	1.00	1.61	Cayuga County line (CR 38)	CR 30 / CR 33	Lamson Road in Lysander	—	—	
CR 35	2.59	4.17	CR 81 in Clay	CR 91 in Clay	Van Vleck and Long Branch roads	—	—	
CR 36	3.68	5.92	Main Street in Camillus village	CR 31 / CR 138 in Camillus	New North Street and Newport Road	—	—	
CR 37	3.86	6.21	NY 31 / CR 38	CR 29 / CR 189	River Road in Lysander	—	—	
CR 38	3.52	5.66	NY 370	NY 31 / CR 37	Cold Springs and River roads in Lysander	—	—	
CR 39	5.92	9.53	NY 175 / CR 43 in Onondaga	Syracuse city line in Geddes	Split Rock, Cedarvale, and Fay roads and Grand Avenue	—	—	
CR 40	6.77	10.90	NY 174 / NY 175 / CR 41 in Marcellus	CR 39 / CR 110 in Onondaga	Howlett Hill and Dunbar Woods roads	—	—	Includes loop of Howlett Hill Road off Dunbar Woods Road
CR 41	5.96	9.59	US 20 in Skaneateles village	NY 175 / CR 40 in Marcellus	Onondaga Street, New Seneca Turnpike, and Main Street	—	—	Overlaps with NY 174 east of North Street; former routing of NY 175
CR 42	3.56	5.73	NY 80 / CR 129	CR 43 / CR 44	Cedarvale Road in Onondaga	—	—	
CR 43	1.80	2.90	CR 42 / CR 44	NY 175 / CR 39	Cedarvale Road in Onondaga	—	—	
CR 44	8.02	12.91	CR 124 in Onondaga	CR 42 / CR 43 in Onondaga	Stevens, Cedarvale–Amber, Hourigan, and Amber roads	—	—	
CR 45	6.38	10.27	Bridge over CSX railroad line in Syracuse CR 148 in Salina	CR 148 in Salina CR 46 (segment 1) at CSX railroad bridge in Clay	7th North Street Henry Clay Boulevard and Buckley Road	—	—	
CR 46	5.25	8.45	CR 81 CR 46 (segment 1) / CR 47	CR 45 (segment 2) at CSX railroad bridge Oswego County line (CR 10)	Buckley Road in Clay Morgan Road	—	—	
CR 47	2.55	4.10	NY 931G / CR 91 in Liverpool	CR 46 in Clay	Tulip Street and Morgan Road	—	—	
CR 48	3.98	6.41	NY 370 / CR 137 in Salina	US 11 / CR 19 in Clay	Buckley and West Taft roads	—	—	
CR 49	5.15	8.29	US 11 in Cicero	CR 17 / CR 50 in Clay	Caughdenoy Road	—	—	
CR 50	5.48	8.82	CR 17 / CR 49	Oswego County line (CR 33)	Caughdenoy Road in Clay	—	—	
CR 51	2.89	4.65	Oswego Road (NY 931G) in Liverpool	CR 48 / CR 161 in Clay	Vine Street and West Taft Road	—	—	
CR 52	0.98	1.58	CR 112	Syracuse city line	LaFayette Road in Onondaga	—	—	
CR 53	9.60	15.45	NY 290 in De Witt NY 290	CR 53 (segment 2) in Manlius Madison County line (CR 1)	James and Kinne streets and Kirkville Road North Kirkville Road in Manlius	—	—	
CR 53A	0.12	0.19	CR 53 (segment 1)	CR 53 (segment 1)	Kirkville Road Spur in Manlius	—	—	
CR 54	1.89	3.04	CR 53 / CR 55	NY 298 / CR 115	Schepps Corners Road in Manlius	—	—	
CR 55	2.38	3.83	NY 290 in Manlius	CR 53 / CR 54 in Manlius	South Main Street, Costello Parkway, and Minoa Road	—	—	
CR 56	0.44	0.71	CR 109	NY 257	Brooklea Drive in Fayetteville	—	—	
CR 57	3.05	4.91	CR 31 / CR 64 in Van Buren	CR 63 / CR 163 in Camillus	Warners Road	—	—	Entire length overlaps with NY 173. Not to be confused with the former NY 57, which is now CR 91 but signed as CR 57.
CR 58	0.64	1.03	CR 60 / CR 135 NY 31 / NY 173 / CR 204	NY 31 CR 272	Laird Road in Elbridge Elderberry Street in Van Buren	—	—	
CR 59	1.40	2.25	NY 31	CR 165	Grimes Road in Elbridge	—	—	
CR 60	3.72	5.99	Jordan village line	CR 58 / CR 135	Mechanic Street and Peru Road in Elbridge	—	—	
CR 61	1.79	2.88	NY 31	Cayuga County line (CR 16)	River Road in Elbridge	—	—	
CR 62	0.31	0.50	NY 173	NY 175	Broad Road in Onondaga	—	—	
CR 63	4.07	6.55	CR 57 / CR 163 NY 173 / CR 63 (segment 1)	CR 98 Solvay village line	Warners Road in Camillus Milton Avenue in Camillus	—	—	Entire length overlaps with NY 173 Entire length overlaps with NY 297
CR 64	3.65	5.87	CR 67 at CSX railroad line	CR 31 / CR 57	Bennetts Corners and Warners roads in Van Buren	—	—	Overlaps with NY 173 east of Bennetts Corners Road
CR 66	4.59	7.39	Forward Road (NY 931F) in Camillus	CR 67 / CR 183 in Van Buren	Bennetts Corners Road	—	—	Overlaps with NY 321 south of NY 5
CR 67	0.21	0.34	CR 66 / CR 183	CR 64 at CSX railroad line	Bennetts Cors in Van Buren	—	—	
CR 68	0.28	0.45	NY 174	CR 40	Main Street and Sheehan Road in Marcellus	—	—	
CR 69	1.42	2.29	US 11	CR 70 / CR 71	Molloy Road in Salina	—	—	
CR 70	1.13	1.82	NY 298 in De Witt	CR 87 in Salina	Town Line Road	—	—	
CR 71	1.93	3.11	CR 69 / CR 70	CR 82	East Molloy Road in De Witt	—	—	
CR 71A	0.25	0.40	NY 298	CR 71	Kinne Street in De Witt	—	—	
CR 71B	0.13	0.21	CR 71A	Dead end	Old Collamer Road in De Witt	—	—	
CR 72	1.17	1.88	End of county maintenance	CR 263	Richard Road in Spafford	—	—	
CR 73	3.51	5.65	US 20 in Skaneateles	NY 174 / CR 83 in Marcellus	Lee Mulroy Road	—	—	Entire length overlaps with NY 175
CR 74	0.19	0.31	CR 12	Madison County line (CR 59)	Dam Road in Fabius	—	—	
CR 75	0.26	0.42	CR 39 / CR 240	Geddes town line	Terry Road in Onondaga	—	—	
CR 76	1.11	1.79	NY 298	CR 77	New Venture Gear Drive in De Witt	—	—	
CR 77	3.38	5.44	NY 290 in East Syracuse	NY 298 / CR 251 in De Witt	Hartwell Avenue and Fly Road	—	—	Designated NY 415 from 1930 to mid-1960s
CR 78	0.60	0.97	CR 28 in Clay	Syracuse Hancock International Airport in Salina	Col. Eileen Collins Boulevard	—	—	
CR 79	4.84	7.79	NY 80 in Fabius	US 11 in LaFayette	Sky High and Meaker Hill roads	—	—	
CR 80	4.40	7.08	Managers Place	Syracuse city line	State Fair Boulevard in Geddes	—	—	Split into two segments by NY 931B between NY 695 and NY 297; formerly part of NY 48
CR 81	4.11	6.61	I-690 exit 4 / NY 48 in Geddes	CR 46 in Clay	John Glenn Boulevard	—	—	
CR 82	3.86	6.21	NY 298 in De Witt	CR 13 / CR 14 / CR 214 in Cicero	Northern Boulevard	—	—	
CR 82A	0.17	0.27	CR 82	CR 214	Northern Boulevard Spur in Cicero	—	—	
CR 83	0.89	1.43	NY 174 / NY 175 / CR 73	CR 150	South Street in Marcellus	—	—	Former routing of NY 174
CR 84	3.81	6.13	NY 31 in Elbridge	CR 58 / CR 272 in Van Buren	McDowell Road and Old Route 31	—	—	Former routing of NY 31
CR 85	0.20	0.32	Syracuse city line	CR 80	Willis Avenue in Geddes	—	—	
CR 86	0.91	1.46	CR 53 / CR 181 (segment 1)	NY 298	Kinne Street in De Witt	—	—	
CR 87	1.40	2.25	US 11	CR 70	Malden Avenue in Salina	—	—	
CR 88	0.53	0.85	CR 91 in Salina	CR 47 in Clay	Liverpool Bypass	—	—	
CR 91	8.02	12.91	NY 931G / CR 47 in Liverpool	Oswego County line in Clay (CR 57)	Oswego Road, Oswego Street, and Old Route 57	—	—	Formerly part of NY 57; signed as Onondaga CR 57.
CR 92	0.54	0.87	NY 31 / NY 690	Baldwinsville village line	Downer Street Road in Van Buren	—	—	Former routing of NY 31
CR 93	1.68	2.70	US 11	CR 70	Factory Avenue in Salina	—	—	
CR 94	2.21	3.56	NY 5	NY 290	North Burdick Street in Manlius	—	—	
CR 95	2.11	3.40	NY 48	CR 140	Hencle Boulevard in Lysander	—	—	Entire length overlaps with NY 631
CR 96	1.63	2.62	CR 91	NY 931K at NY 481 exit 12 southbound on-ramp	Soule Road in Clay	—	—	
CR 97	0.63	1.01	CR 102	Thomas Avenue	Thomas Avenue Extension in Camillus	—	—	
CR 98	3.83	6.16	CR 206	NY 930W at Geddes town line	West Genesee Street in Camillus	—	—	Former routing of NY 5
CR 99	0.37	0.60	Cayuga County line (CR 31B)	—	East Brutus Road in Elbridge	—	—	Formerly part of NY 31B
CR 100	1.05	1.69	NY 173 / CR 63	CR 106 (segment 1) at Ninemile Creek	Airport Road in Camillus	—	—	
CR 101	1.16	1.87	CR 39	Syracuse city line	Bellevue Avenue in Onondaga	—	—	
CR 102	0.75	1.21	NY 173 / CR 63	CR 97	Belle Isle Road in Camillus	—	—	
CR 103	1.81	2.91	Syracuse city line in Onondaga	CR 6 in De Witt	Jamesville Toll Road	—	—	
CR 104	1.32	2.12	NY 41	CR 246	Stanton Road in Spafford	—	—	
CR 105	2.5	4.0	NY 5 in Elbridge	NY 31C (now NY 317) in Jordan	North Street, Jordan Road, Elbridge Street	—	2003	Turned over to New York State in 2003, now NY 317.
CR 106	3.73	6.00	CR 100 at Ninemile Creek in Camillus CR 106 (segment 1) in Camillus	CR 28 (seg. 1) / CR 118 (seg. 1) / CR 194 in Van Buren CR 80 in Geddes	Van Buren Road Armstrong Road	—	—	
CR 107	1.68	2.70	NY 321	NY 5	Halfway Road in Elbridge	—	—	Formerly NY 368
CR 108	3.67	5.91	Cortland County line (CR 152)	NY 80 / CR 128	Kenney Road and Keeney Street in Fabius	—	—	
CR 109	9.81	15.79	US 20 / CR 114 in Pompey NY 91 / CR 109 (segment 1)	CR 56 in Fayetteville US 20	Sweet Road, Highbridge Street, and Limestone Plaza Cherry Street in Pompey	—	—	
CR 110	2.42	3.89	CR 39 / CR 40	NY 173	Howlett Hill Road in Onondaga	—	—	
CR 111	5.01	8.06	US 11 / NY 80 in Tully	US 11 in LaFayette	Warren Street and Tully Road	—	—	
CR 112	6.92	11.14	US 20 in LaFayette	CR 52 in Onondaga	Lafayette Road	—	—	
CR 113	2.02	3.25	CR 24	CR 246	West Valley Road in Spafford	—	—	
CR 113A	0.56	0.90	CR 113 in Spafford	CR 24 in Otisco	Sawmill Road	—	—	
CR 114	5.11	8.22	NY 80 / NY 91 in Fabius	US 20 / CR 109 in Pompey	Berwyn Road	—	—	
CR 115	4.03	6.49	CR 53 CR 115 (segment 1) CR 115 (segment 1)	NY 298 / CR 54 Madison County line (CR 2) Madison County line (CR 6)	North Manlius Road in Manlius Peck Road in Manlius Fyler Road in Manlius	—	—	Includes two dead end spurs at New York State Thruway Includes both legs of wye connection at west end
CR 117	5.03	8.10	NY 38A	NY 41A	Benson Road in Skaneateles	—	—	
CR 118	2.98	4.80	NY 173 / CR 64	CR 28 (seg. 1) / CR 106 (seg. 1) / CR 194	Brickyard Road in Van Buren	—	—	
CR 118A	0.50	0.80	CR 118B	CR 106 (segment 1)	Herman Road in Van Buren	—	—	
CR 118B	0.54	0.87	CR 216 at Ted Park Drive	CR 118A	Herman Road in Van Buren	—	—	
CR 119	5.02	8.08	CR 150 in Marcellus	CR 43 in Onondaga	Pleasant Valley Road	—	—	
CR 120	5.89	9.48	CR 84	CR 231 / CR 272	Kingdom Road in Van Buren	—	—	
CR 121	3.20	5.15	CR 45 / CR 161	NY 31 / CR 265	Henry Clay Boulevard in Clay	—	—	
CR 122	2.12	3.41	CR 22 / CR 271	NY 5 / CR 105	Jordan Road and South Street in Elbridge	—	—	
CR 123	3.03	4.88	NY 31	CR 15	Lake Shore Road in Cicero	—	—	
CR 124	2.81	4.52	CR 23 / CR 24 in Otisco	NY 174 in Marcellus	Otisco Valley Road	—	—	
CR 125	0.74	1.19	CR 5 / CR 171	Madison County line (CR 46)	Delphi Falls Road in Pompey	—	—	
CR 126	0.57	0.92	Cortland County line (CR 153)	Madison County line (CR 55)	DeRuyter Road in Fabius	—	—	
CR 127	1.12	1.80	CR 30 / CR 193	Oswego County line (CR 55)	Fenner Road in Lysander	—	—	
CR 128	5.73	9.22	NY 80 / CR 108 in Fabius	US 20 in Pompey	Ridge Road	—	—	
CR 129	5.72	9.21	NY 80 / CR 42	NY 175	Makyes Road in Onondaga	—	—	
CR 130	1.46	2.35	NY 175	Syracuse city line	Velasco Road in Onondaga	—	—	
CR 131	1.25	2.01	NY 41	NY 174 / CR 21	Eibert Road in Spafford	—	—	
CR 132	4.82	7.76	NY 5 in Fayetteville	Madison County line in Manlius (CR 93)	Salt Springs Street and Salt Springs Road	—	—	
CR 133	6.37	10.25	Cayuga County line in Skaneateles (CR 83)	CR 41 in Marcellus	Old Seneca Turnpike	—	—	
CR 134	3.39	5.46	Cortland County line (intersects CR 104) NY 281	NY 11A / NY 80 US 11	Lake Road in Tully Meeting House Road in Tully	—	—	
CR 135	4.29	6.90	NY 5 in Elbridge	CR 84 in Elbridge	Fikes and Laird roads	—	—	Discontinuous at CR 183 and NY 31
CR 136	4.23	6.81	NY 290	CR 18	Fremont Road in Manlius	—	—	
CR 137	2.04	3.28	NY 370 / CR 48 in Salina	NY 370 in Liverpool	Old Liverpool Road	—	—	
CR 138	2.46	3.96	CR 31 / CR 36 in Camillus	CR 66 in Van Buren	Canal and Warner–Memphis roads	—	—	
CR 139	3.72	5.99	CR 42 / CR 184	NY 175	Tanner and Bussey roads in Onondaga	—	—	
CR 140	3.70	5.95	Baldwinsville village line	CR 29	Sixty Road in Lysander	—	—	
CR 141	5.73	9.22	CR 91	CR 49	Ver Plank Road in Clay	—	—	
CR 142	2.99	4.81	CR 22 in Skaneateles	CR 122 in Elbridge	Vinegar Hill Road	—	—	
CR 143	2.27	3.65	NY 175	CR 40	Beef Street in Onondaga	—	—	
CR 144	2.27	3.65	CR 112	CR 1	Coye Road in LaFayette	—	—	
CR 145	4.34	6.98	CR 9 in Pompey	NY 173 in De Witt	Gates Road	—	—	
CR 146	5.83	9.38	CR 125	NY 92	Pompey Hollow Road in Pompey	—	—	Briefly enters Madison County as CR 9
CR 147	1.27	2.04	NY 31	CR 123	Whiting Road in Cicero	—	—	
CR 148	2.34	3.77	CR 148	CR 48	Electronics Parkway and Hopkins Road in Salina	—	—	
CR 150	6.90	11.10	CR 124	NY 174 / CR 41	Slate Hill Road in Marcellus	—	—	Includes Platt Road between CR 83 and CR 150 near north end
CR 151	2.01	3.23	US 20 / CR 161	NY 80	Hitchings Road in Onondaga	—	—	
CR 152	1.23	1.98	CR 50	Cicero	Guy Young Road in Clay	—	—	
CR 153	4.36	7.02	NY 173 / CR 64	NY 931P at NY 690 southbound on-ramp	East Sorrell Hill Road in Van Buren	—	—	
CR 154	1.00	1.61	CR 22	CR 133	Mottville Road in Skaneateles	—	—	
CR 155	1.76	2.83	CR 40 / CR 179 in Onondaga	CR 98 in Camillus	Kasson Road	—	—	
CR 156	3.01	4.84	CR 32	NY 370	Tater Road in Lysander	—	—	
CR 157	3.68	5.92	NY 370	CR 38	Hayes and Hicks roads in Lysander	—	—	
CR 158	2.18	3.51	CR 84	CR 120 / CR 158A	River Road in Van Buren	—	—	
CR 158A	1.27	2.04	CR 120 / CR 158	CR 241	Connors Road in Van Buren	—	—	
CR 159	1.60	2.57	CR 194	NY 48	Hardscrabble Road Extension in Van Buren	—	—	
CR 160	1.70	2.74	CR 91 CR 199 at Maider Road	Dead end at NY 481 CR 46	Maider Road in Clay Bonstead Road in Clay	—	—	
CR 161	2.22	3.57	CR 48 / CR 51	CR 45 / CR 121	Buckley Road in Clay	—	—	
CR 162	1.97	3.17	CR 106 in Camillus	Dead end at New York State Thruway in Van Buren	Winchell Road	—	—	
CR 162A	0.16	0.26	CR 162	CR 162	Winchell Road in Van Buren	—	—	
CR 163	1.99	3.20	CR 216	NY 173 / CR 57 / CR 63	Thompson Road in Camillus	—	—	
CR 164	2.11	3.40	NY 173 / CR 63 in Camillus	CR 118A in Van Buren	Pottery Road	—	—	
CR 164A	0.58	0.93	CR 164	CR 106 (segment 1)	Armstrong Road in Camillus	—	—	
CR 165	2.56	4.12	NY 31	CR 84	Stevens and Cooper roads in Elbridge	—	—	
CR 165A	0.01	0.016	CR 165	CR 84	Cooper Road in Elbridge	—	—	
CR 166	3.83	6.16	CR 16 US 11	US 11 CR 166 (segment 1)	Ladd, Baird, and Bartell roads in Cicero Miller Road in Cicero	—	—	Includes spur (Ladd Road Extension) at south end Includes spur (Miller Circle) at east end
CR 168	2.10	3.38	NY 175 in Marcellus	CR 40 in Onondaga	Northeast Town Line Road	—	—	
CR 169	4.63	7.45	NY 92 in Pompey	CR 132 in Manlius	Palmer Road	—	—	
CR 170	2.78	4.47	NY 91	US 20	Cemetery Road in Pompey	—	—	
CR 171	5.32	8.56	CR 170	CR 5 / CR 125	No. 5 Road in Pompey	—	—	
CR 172	2.98	4.80	NY 80	CR 129	Griffin Corns in Onondaga	—	—	
CR 173	4.72	7.60	US 11 in LaFayette	CR 174 in Onondaga	Sentinel Heights Road	—	—	
CR 174	1.70	2.74	US 11	CR 52	Rockwell and Graham roads in Onondaga	—	—	
CR 175	1.72	2.77	Cortland County line (CR 150)	Douglas Street	Truxton Hill Road and Grove Street in Tully	—	—	
CR 176	4.89	7.87	Cayuga County line (CR 146)	CR 133 / CR 202	Stump Road in Skaneateles	—	—	
CR 176A	1.01	1.63	CR 133 in Marcellus	CR 176 in Skaneateles	Northwest Town Line Road	—	—	
CR 177	1.98	3.19	NY 174	CR 150	Rockwell Road in Marcellus	—	—	
CR 178	3.64	5.86	Cortland County line (CR 156)	NY 80	Vincent Corners Road in Fabius	—	—	
CR 179	2.08	3.35	NY 175	CR 40 / CR 155	Kasson Road in Onondaga	—	—	
CR 180	4.20	6.76	NY 370	Oswego County line (CR 14)	East Mud Lake Road in Lysander	—	—	
CR 181	1.66	2.67	NY 635 CR 86 NY 298	CR 53 / CR 86 CR 53 Kinne Street	Exeter Street in De Witt Franklin Park Drive in De Witt Court Street Spur in De Witt	—	—	
CR 182	6.49	10.44	US 20 in Pompey	NY 173 in Manlius	Hall–Henneberry and Henneberry roads	—	—	
CR 183	5.39	8.67	NY 317 in Elbridge	CR 66 / CR 67 in Van Buren	Whiting Road	—	—	
CR 184	3.54	5.70	CR 44	NY 80	Tanner Road in Onondaga	—	—	
CR 185	0.68	1.09	CR 166	Muskrat Bay Road	Ladd Road in Cicero	—	—	
CR 186	5.29	8.51	NY 80 in Fabius	US 20 in Pompey	Berry Road and Apulia–Shanahan Road	—	—	
CR 187	2.40	3.86	CR 46	CR 50	Oak Orchard Road in Clay	—	—	
CR 188	1.11	1.79	Highland Forest (county park) north entrance	NY 80	Highland Park Road in Fabius	—	—	
CR 189	1.29	2.08	CR 29	Oswego County line	Pendergast Road in Lysander	—	—	
CR 190	4.49	7.23	Main Street in Camillus village CR 190 (segment 1)	NY 173 / NY 297 / CR 63 in Camillus NY 173 / CR 63 (segment 1)	Milton Avenue Bennett Road	—	—	
CR 191	3.60	5.79	CR 51 in Clay	US 11 / NY 930J in North Syracuse	Bear Road	—	—	
CR 192	5.20	8.37	CR 30	NY 48 / NY 690	Church Road in Lysander	—	—	
CR 193	3.34	5.38	NY 370	CR 30	Fenner Road in Lysander	—	—	
CR 194	1.79	2.88	CR 216	CR 159	Van Buren Road in Van Buren	—	—	
CR 195	3.71	5.97	NY 173 / CR 64	CR 92	West Sorrell Hill Road in Van Buren	—	—	
CR 196	1.54	2.48	CR 109	NY 173	Troop K Road in Manlius	—	—	
CR 197	3.16	5.09	CR 49	NY 31	Maple and Grange roads in Clay	—	—	Includes entirety of Grange Road
CR 198	2.12	3.41	CR 112 in LaFayette	NY 173 in Onondaga	Barker Hill Road	—	—	
CR 199	2.83	4.55	CR 160	CR 160 at Maider Road	Bonstead Road in Clay	—	—	
CR 200	0.43	0.69	CR 169	Madison County line	Owahgena Road in Pompey	—	—	
CR 201	1.25	2.01	CR 129	CR 172	Cole Road in Onondaga	—	—	
CR 202	0.98	1.58	CR 41 in Marcellus	CR 133 / CR 176 in Skaneateles	Northwest Townline Road	—	—	
CR 202A	0.44	0.71	CR 202	CR 41	Murphy Road in Marcellus	—	—	
CR 203	0.30	0.48	CR 183	CR 160	Whiting Road Extension in Elbridge	—	—	
CR 204	0.39	0.63	CR 84 / CR 272	CR 64	Old Route 31 and Warners Road in Van Buren	—	—	Overlaps with NY 173 east of NY 31
CR 205	1.74	2.80	CR 48	CR 191	Allen Road in Clay	—	—	Includes portion of Chestnut Street between CR 205 and North Syracuse village line
CR 206	1.76	2.83	CR 40	CR 98	Munro Road in Camillus	—	—	
CR 208	7.46	12.01	I-81 exit 26 / US 11 in Salina	CR 15 in Cicero	South Bay Road	—	—	
CR 209	1.26	2.03	CR 98	NY 173 / CR 63	Hinsdale Road in Camillus	—	—	
CR 210	1.43	2.30	Dead end	CR 32	Spraque Road in Lysander	—	—	
CR 210A	1.93	3.11	CR 32	CR 210	Cross Lake Road in Lysander	—	—	
CR 211	11.96	19.25	CR 27 CR 41	NY 174 NY 174	Rose Hill and Bishop Hill roads in Marcellus Lawrence Road in Marcellus	—	—	Discontinuous at US 20
CR 212	2.98	4.80	CR 129	NY 175	Abbey Road in Onondaga	—	—	
CR 213	1.96	3.15	NY 48	CR 140	Kellogg Road in Lysander	—	—	
CR 214	5.15	8.29	NY 31	CR 215	Fergerson and Island roads in Cicero	—	—	
CR 215	3.01	4.84	NY 31	NY 31	Cicero Center, Island, and Eastwood roads in Cicero	—	—	
CR 216	4.74	7.63	CR 36 in Camillus CR 118	CR 118B in Van Buren Dead end at NY 690	Devoe and Herman roads Peck Road in Van Buren	—	—	Includes dead end spur (DeJohn Road) at north end
CR 216A	1.66	2.67	CR 28	NY 48	O'Brien Road in Van Buren	—	—	
CR 217	3.37	5.42	CR 176 in Skaneateles	NY 5 in Elbridge	Kingston Road	—	—	
CR 218	2.99	4.81	NY 91	CR 9	Pratts Falls in Pompey	—	—	
CR 219	0.85	1.37	Syracuse city line	US 11	Lemoyne Avenue in Salina	—	—	
CR 220	0.35	0.56	Thomas Avenue	Solvay village line	Gere Lock Road in Camillus	—	—	
CR 221	1.07	1.72	CR 106 in Van Buren	State Fair Boulevard in Geddes	Walters Road	—	—	
CR 221A	0.62	1.00	Van Vleck Road	CR 80	Managers Place in Geddes	—	—	
CR 222	1.48	2.38	NY 173	Syracuse city line	McDonald Road in Onondaga	—	—	
CR 223	0.11	0.18	Milton Avenue	NY 173 / CR 63 / CR 190	Bennett Road in Camillus	—	—	
CR 225	2.66	4.28	NY 174	CR 206	Martisco and Lyons roads in Camillus	—	—	Includes dead end spur near west end
CR 226	2.21	3.56	CR 158	CR 272	Daboll Road in Van Buren	—	—	
CR 227	1.10	1.77	Peck Hill Road	CR 7	Quintard Road in De Witt	—	—	
CR 228	0.71	1.14	Syracuse city line	NY 298	Teall Avenue in Salina	—	—	
CR 229	2.92	4.70	Baldwinsville village line	CR 29	Smokey Hollow Road in Lysander	—	—	
CR 231	1.91	3.07	CR 120	CR 120 / CR 272	Gunbarrel Road in Van Buren	—	—	
CR 232	3.90	6.28	CR 1	CR 144	Eager Road in LaFayette	—	—	
CR 232A	0.64	1.03	CR 112	CR 232	Reidy Hill Road in LaFayette	—	—	
CR 233	2.37	3.81	CR 108	NY 80 / NY 91	Bailey Road in Fabius	—	—	
CR 234	5.55	8.93	CR 238 in Tully	US 20 in LaFayette	Tully Farms Road	—	—	
CR 235	3.10	4.99	CR 131 in Spafford	CR 27 in Skaneateles	Shamrock Road	—	—	
CR 236	8.88	14.29	CR 41 in Marcellus CR 236 (segment 1) CR 236 (segment 1) CR 236 (segment 1)	NY 321 in Elbridge NY 321 NY 174 CR 236 (segment 1)	Gypsy and Limeledge roads Flat Rock Road in Camillus Glover Road in Marcellus Stump and Northwest Town Line roads	—	—	Four sections
CR 237	5.68	9.14	NY 80 / NY 91 in Pompey	CR 114 in Pompey	Chase Road and Swift Road	—	—	Includes Chase Road from CR 238 to NY 91 near midpoint of route
CR 238	0.96	1.54	NY 80	NY 11A	Tully Farms Road in Tully	—	—	
CR 238A	0.46	0.74	CR 238	US 11	Solvay Road in Tully	—	—	
CR 239	3.46	5.57	CR 50	CR 50	Black Creek Road in Clay	—	—	
CR 240	2.86	4.60	Dead end in Onondaga	Syracuse city line in Geddes	Onondaga Boulevard	—	—	
CR 241	2.67	4.30	CR 120	CR 120	Perry in Van Buren	—	—	
CR 242	2.31	3.72	CR 129	NY 175	Young Road in Onondaga	—	—	
CR 242A	0.94	1.51	CR 242	CR 129	Tucker Road in Onondaga	—	—	
CR 242B	1.16	1.87	CR 139	CR 242	Norton Road in Onondaga	—	—	
CR 243	2.03	3.27	NY 175	CR 40	Frank Gay Road in Marcellus	—	—	
CR 244	1.47	2.37	CR 176 in Skaneateles	CR 236 in Camillus	Shepard Road	—	—	
CR 245	1.43	2.30	CR 136 in Manlius	North Main Street in Minoa	Central Avenue	—	—	
CR 246	6.58	10.59	CR 24 in Otisco	NY 11A in LaFayette	Spafford–LaFayette and Otisco roads	—	—	
CR 246A	0.73	1.17	CR 26	CR 113	Churchill Road in Spafford	—	—	
CR 247	3.74	6.02	CR 23 in Otisco	US 20 in Onondaga	Otisco–joshua and Buckwheat Road	—	—	
CR 248	3.05	4.91	NY 174	CR 168	Falls Road in Marcellus	—	—	
CR 249	1.18	1.90	CR 186 in LaFayette	CR 114 in Pompey	Collins Road	—	—	
CR 250	3.73	6.00	CR 145 in Pompey	CR 10 in Manlius	Broadfield Road	—	—	
CR 251	1.19	1.92	NY 298 / CR 77	CR 18 / CR 19	Fly Road in De Witt	—	—	
CR 252	3.44	5.54	CR 91	CR 161	Wetzel Road in Clay	—	—	
CR 253	2.45	3.94	NY 931J at I-81 exit 30 northbound on-ramp	CR 16	Pardee and Sneller roads in Cicero	—	—	
CR 255	2.82	4.54	US 20	US 11	Webb Road in LaFayette	—	—	
CR 255A	0.71	1.14	US 20	CR 255	Naughton Road in LaFayette	—	—	
CR 255B	0.74	1.19	CR 255A	Dead end at I-81	Still Meadow Road in LaFayette	—	—	
CR 255C	0.13	0.21	Dead end at I-81	US 11	Moltion Road in LaFayette	—	—	
CR 256	1.81	2.91	NY 80	CR 256B	Cook Road in Otisco	—	—	
CR 256A	1.90	3.06	NY 80	CR 256B	Kingsley Road in Otisco	—	—	
CR 256B	0.86	1.38	CR 256	CR 256A	Case Road in Otisco	—	—	
CR 257	0.95	1.53	Cortland County line	CR 134	Wetmore Road in Tully	—	—	
CR 258	1.75	2.82	NY 80 in Fabius	CR 125 in Pompey	Cardner Road	—	—	
CR 259	1.62	2.61	NY 41	CR 259A	Pork Street in Skaneateles	—	—	
CR 259A	2.68	4.31	CR 27	CR 41	Rickard Road in Skaneateles	—	—	
CR 260	2.23	3.59	CR 259A in Skaneateles	NY 174 in Marcellus	Masters Road	—	—	
CR 260A	1.38	2.22	US 20	CR 260	Williams Road in Marcellus	—	—	
CR 261	1.75	2.82	CR 256 in Otisco	US 20 / CR 151 in Onondaga	Hitching Road	—	—	
CR 263	2.88	4.63	NY 41	CR 263A	Woodworth Road in Spafford	—	—	
CR 263A	2.03	3.27	CR 263	NY 41	Nunnery Road in Spafford	—	—	
CR 265	1.52	2.45	NY 31 / CR 121	CR 187	Henry Clay Boulevard in Clay	—	—	
CR 266	0.18	0.29	CR 62	Community General Hospital	Broad Road in Onondaga	—	—	
CR 267	0.12	0.19	Dead end	NY 91	County Garage Road in De Witt	—	—	
CR 270	0.38	0.61	End of county maintenance	CR 109	Sevier Road in Pompey	—	—	
CR 271	3.50	5.63	CR 22 / CR 122	Jordan village line	Hamilton Road in Elbridge	—	—	
CR 272	4.39	7.07	CR 58 / CR 84	NY 31	West Dead Creek Road in Van Buren	—	—	
CR 273	0.28	0.45	CR 1	End of county maintenance	West Shore Manor Road in LaFayette	—	—	
CR 274	0.75	1.21	CR 6	CR 7	Nottingham Road in De Witt	—	—	
Former

== See also ==
- County routes in New York
- List of former state routes in New York (401–500)
