= New York State Route 175 =

State highway in Onondaga County, New York, US

New York State Route 175
- NY 175 highlighted in red

Route information
- Maintained by NYSDOT, Onondaga County and the city of Syracuse
- Length: 15.46 mi (24.88 km)
- Existed: 1930–present

Major junctions
- West end: US 20 in Skaneateles
- East end: US 11 in Syracuse

Location
- Country: United States
- State: New York
- Counties: Onondaga

Highway system
- New York Highways; Interstate; US; State; Reference; Parkways
← NY 174	→ NY 176

New York State Route 175 (NY 175) is an east–west state highway located entirely within Onondaga County, New York, in the United States. The 15.46-mile (24.88 km) route begins at an intersection with U.S. Route 20 (US 20) east of the village of Skaneateles and passes through the village of Marcellus before ending at a junction with US 11 in Syracuse. The highway was designated in the 1930 renumbering of state highways in New York.

The section of NY 175 from the town of Marcellus to the end of the NY 173 concurrency is part of the Seneca Turnpike, which was established in 1800 and dissolved in 1852. This portion of the Seneca Turnpike was instrumental in the development of the villages of Skaneateles and Marcellus. When designated in 1930, NY 175 was on a rural stretch of highway connecting Marcellus to Onondaga, and brought about an increase in population and development along its route.

== Route description ==
=== Skaneateles to Marcellus ===
In the west, NY 175 begins at an intersection with US 20 in the town of Skaneateles. The highway heads towards the northeast as Lee Mulroy Road, passing by farmlands and fields as well as several residences. As NY 175 heads to the northeast into the town of Marcellus, it intersects with three county roads. This section of the route is parallel to two other unsigned county roads to the northwest and to the southeast.

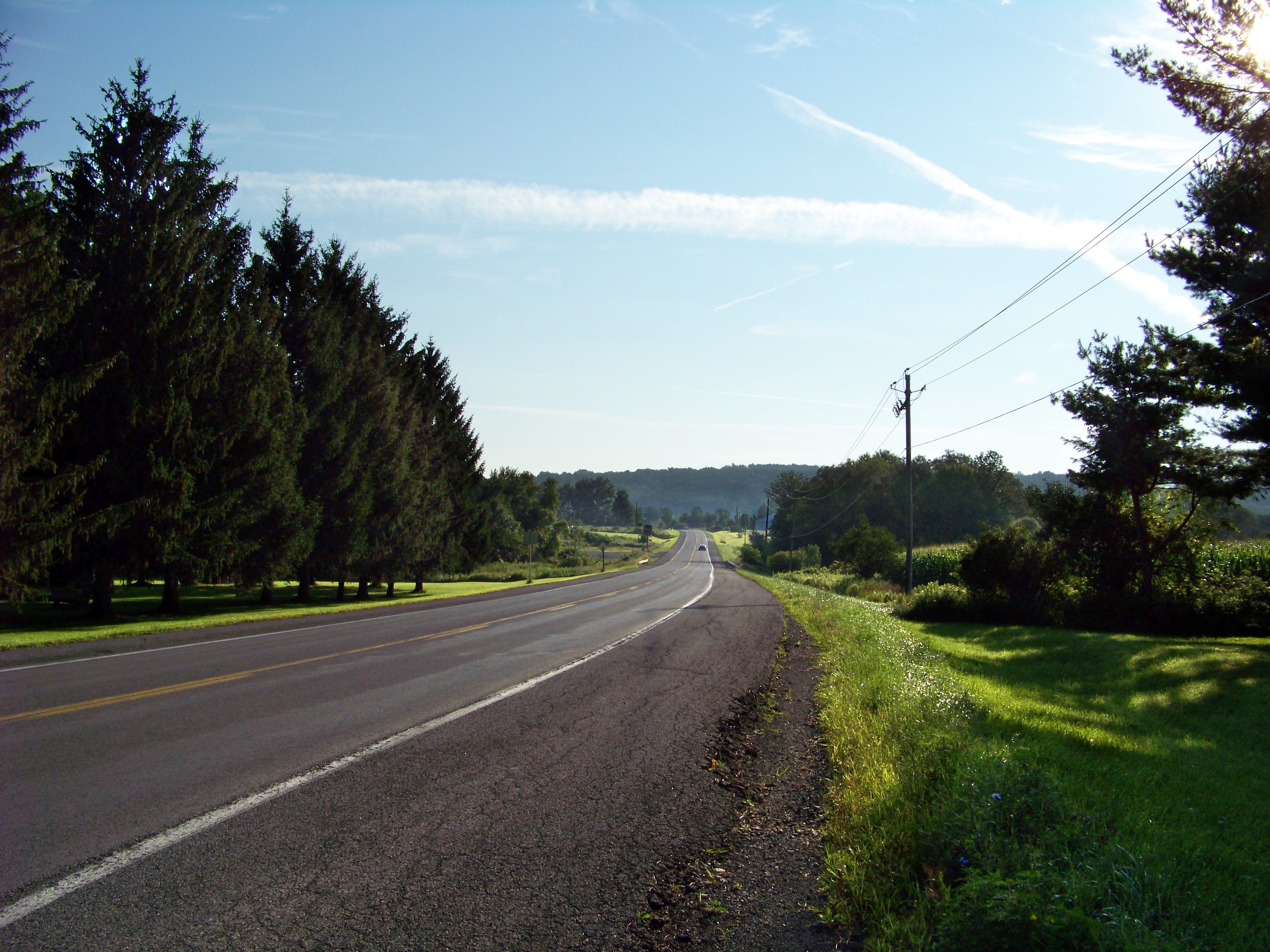
NY 175 just east of Bishop Hill Road

As the highway heads towards the village of Marcellus, it begins edging closer to NY 174. The area becomes slightly more residential as the roads merge and become concurrent. The southern terminus of unsigned County Route 73 (CR 73, named South Street Road) is also at the intersection with NY 174. About 0.6 miles (1.0 km) southwest of this junction, NY 175 crosses West Nine Mile Creek on a bridge inventoried by the New York State Department of Transportation (NYSDOT) as NY 175X. The bridge was built in 1962 and is maintained by Onondaga County, as is the rest of NY 175 west of NY 174.

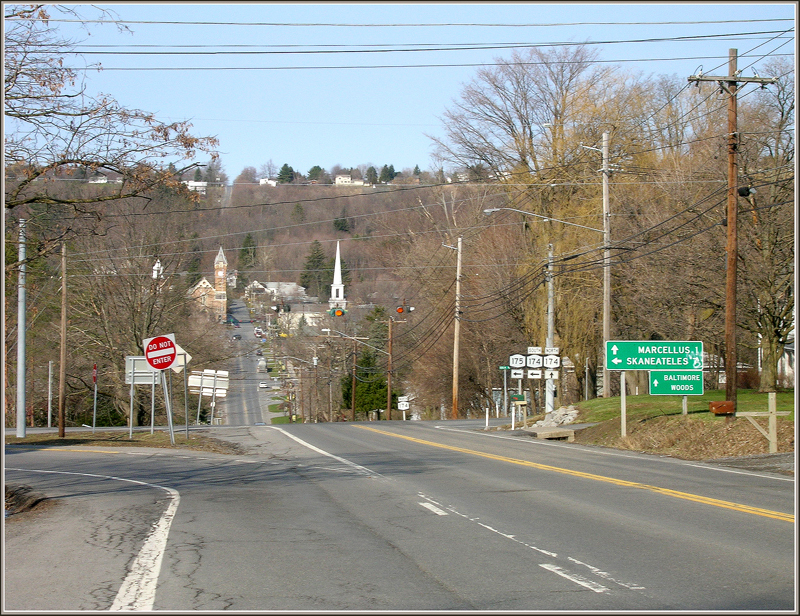
Northern terminus of the NY 174 / NY 175 overlap

NY 174 and NY 175 begin to curve to the northeast as they become parallel with another unsigned county road (CR 150), passing Marcellus County Park along the way. The roads remain as such until an intersection where the county road ends and the two state routes split. In downtown Marcellus, the terrain is flat, with residential homes and commercial businesses surrounding the road. At the split, NY 174 heads to the west through the main street of the village, while NY 175 heads eastward towards Syracuse.

=== Marcellus to Onondaga ===
NY 175 heads eastward out of Marcellus along the West Seneca Turnpike. At the intersection with Frank Gay Road (CR 243), NY 175 passes a golf course and country club. The highway continues eastward into the hamlet of Wellington Corner, before heading towards Onondaga. There is a suburban area here, where NY 175 intersects with a county road. The highway then leaves Wellington Corner after the intersection.

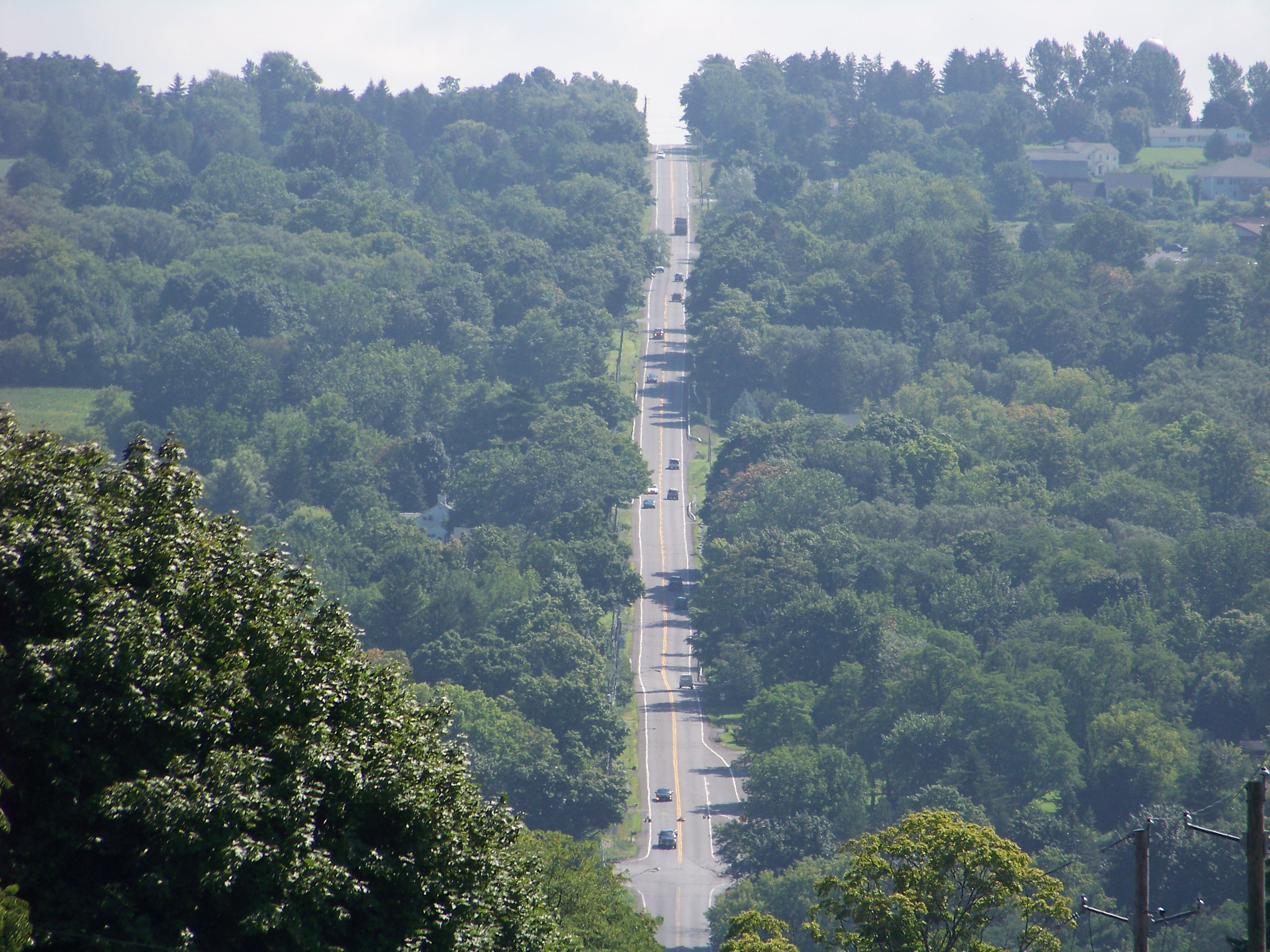
NY 175 headed east from the NY 174 / NY 175 overlap terminus

After exiting Wellington Corner, NY 175 enters another hamlet called Cards Corners. There are a few businesses in this hamlet, with NY 175 and nearby Cedarvale Road being the major roads. The highway then enters a large forested area, at times surrounded by trees. NY 175 continues northeast, passing by several more businesses and soon crosses into the town of Onondaga. In Onondaga, the route passes by the Gen. Orrin Hutchinson House and the Onondaga Community College, intersecting with two consecutive county roads along the way before joining with NY 173. The two roads are concurrent for about 0.2 miles (0.32 km), after which NY 173 heads east towards Manlius while NY 175 heads northeast towards the city of Syracuse.

=== Onondaga to Syracuse ===
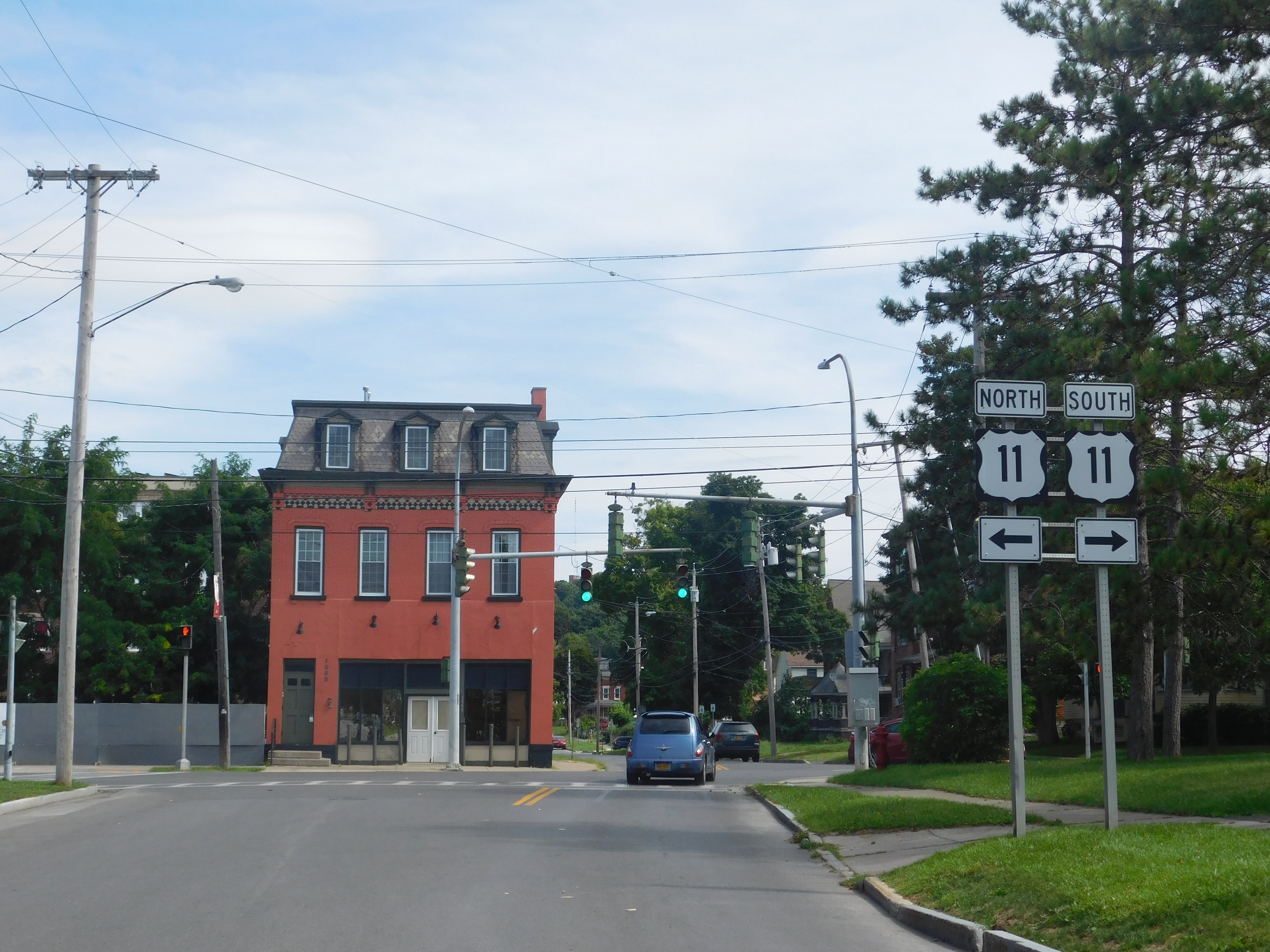
NY 175 approaching US 11 in Syracuse

After leaving NY 173 and the Seneca Turnpike, the highway heads to the northeast through the town of Onondaga as South Avenue. NY 175 passes the Community General Hospital of Greater Syracuse and intersects with a county road before entering the Syracuse city limits. At this point, maintenance of the route shifts from NYSDOT to the city of Syracuse. In Syracuse, NY 175 runs along the western edge of Saint Agnes Cemetery to an intersection with NY 80 at the cemetery's north end. Much of the next area is both residential and commercial in nature, leaving the fields and forests behind.

It intersects a number of city streets as it heads to the northeast, traversing several mixed-use blocks before crossing Onondaga Creek, a north–south waterway that passes through most of Syracuse. On the northeast bank of the creek, NY 175 turns east onto West Kennedy Street, a short connector between the creek and US 11. The route continues for three more blocks along the mostly residential street to US 11, where the east end of West Kennedy Street also marks the east end of NY 175.

== History ==
The section of NY 175 from downtown Marcellus to NY 173 in Onondaga was built along the historical Seneca Turnpike. The turnpike was originally the Genesee Road which began in the city of Utica and ended in the city of Canandaigua. Genesee Road was approved by the state legislature in 1794, and construction began in sections from Utica to Canandaigua. In 1800, the road was renamed to "Seneca Turnpike" when a law was passed to establish a maintenance company. At 157 miles (253 km), the turnpike was the longest in the state at the time.

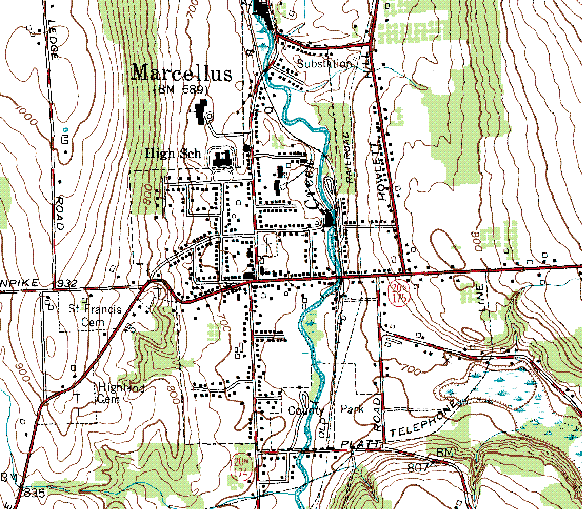
1955 topographic map of downtown Marcellus, then NY 175's western terminus

Soon after settlement of the village of Skaneateles began, the Seneca Turnpike route which originally bypassed the village to the north was relocated southward to go through the growing settlement. The Seneca Turnpike Company closed its doors in 1852. Modern NY 175 does not follow either the original alignment or the relocated alignment, but rather the route of a former trolley line which went from Skaneateles to Syracuse via Marcellus and Onondaga. This trolley line parallels the relocated alignment.

When the NY 175 designation was assigned as part of the 1930 renumbering of state highways in New York, it began at an intersection with US 20 in the village of Skaneateles and utilized the relocated Seneca Turnpike alignment (New Seneca Turnpike) between Skaneateles and Marcellus. This road is now designated but not signed as CR 41 by Onondaga County. A 31-mile (50 km) alternate route of US 20 between Skaneateles and Cazenovia by way of Marcellus was designated as NY 20N c. 1938. The new route utilized pre-existing numbered highways, including NY 175 from NY 174 in Marcellus to NY 173 in Onondaga. The NY 20N designation was removed c. 1962, as was the nearby NY 20SY, another alternate route of US 20 that served downtown Syracuse.

In the 1930s, the western terminus of NY 175 was relocated eastward to NY 174 in downtown Marcellus. The configuration of NY 175 remained unchanged until the early 1960s when the route was re-extended westward over the New Seneca Turnpike to its original terminus in Skaneateles. The section of NY 175 west of Marcellus was realigned in the early 1980s to follow Lee Mulroy Road and NY 174 between US 20 and Marcellus. Ownership and maintenance of the former alignment of NY 175 on the New Seneca Turnpike was eventually transferred to Onondaga County, which designated the highway as CR 41. Additionally, the modern alignment of NY 175 on Lee Mulroy Road is maintained by Onondaga County and co-designated as CR 73.

== Major intersections ==
The entire route is in Onondaga County.

Location	mi	km	Destinations	Notes
Town of Skaneateles	0.00	0.00	US 20 – Skaneateles	Western terminus
Town of Marcellus	3.50	5.63	NY 174 south	Southern terminus of NY 174 / NY 175 overlap
Town of Marcellus	5.01	8.06	NY 174 north – Marcellus	Northern terminus of NY 174 / NY 175 overlap
Onondaga	12.94	20.82	NY 173 west – Fairmount	Hamlet of Onondaga Hill; western terminus NY 173 and NY 175 overlap
Onondaga	13.00	20.92	NY 173 east	Hamlet of Onondaga Hill; eastern terminus NY 173 and NY 175 overlap
Syracuse	14.26	22.95	NY 80 east	Western terminus of NY 80
Syracuse	15.46	24.88	US 11	Eastern terminus
1.000 mi = 1.609 km; 1.000 km = 0.621 mi: Concurrency terminus

== See also ==
- List of county routes in Onondaga County, New York
