= New York State Route 80 =

Highway in New York

New York State Route 80

- NY 80 highlighted in red

Route information
- Maintained by NYSDOT, Madison County, the city of Syracuse, and the village of Cooperstown
- Length: 127.32 mi (204.90 km)
- Existed: late 1920s–present

Major junctions
- West end: NY 175 in Syracuse
- US 20 in Onondaga; I-81 in Tully; US 11 in Tully; NY 13 in New Woodstock; NY 26 in Georgetown, Otselic; NY 12 in Sherburne; NY 8 in New Berlin; NY 28 in Cooperstown, Oaksville; US 20 in Springfield
- North end: NY 5 in Nelliston

Location
- Country: United States
- State: New York
- Counties: Montgomery, Herkimer, Otsego, Chenango, Madison, Onondaga

Highway system
- New York Highways; Interstate; US; State; Reference; Parkways
← NY 79	→ I-81

New York State Route 80 (NY 80) is a 127.32-mile-long (204.90 km) west–east New York State Route located within Onondaga, Madison, Chenango, Otsego, Herkimer, and Montgomery counties in New York. Its western terminus is located at a junction with NY 175 in the city of Syracuse in Onondaga County, from which it actually runs in a north–south direction for 20 miles (32 km). The eastern terminus is located at a junction with NY 5 in the village of Nelliston in Montgomery County. The route is signed north–south from U.S. Route 20 (US 20) north to NY 5.

Most of NY 80 between Sherburne and Cooperstown follows the routing of the Second Great Western Turnpike, a 19th-century toll road.

== Route description ==
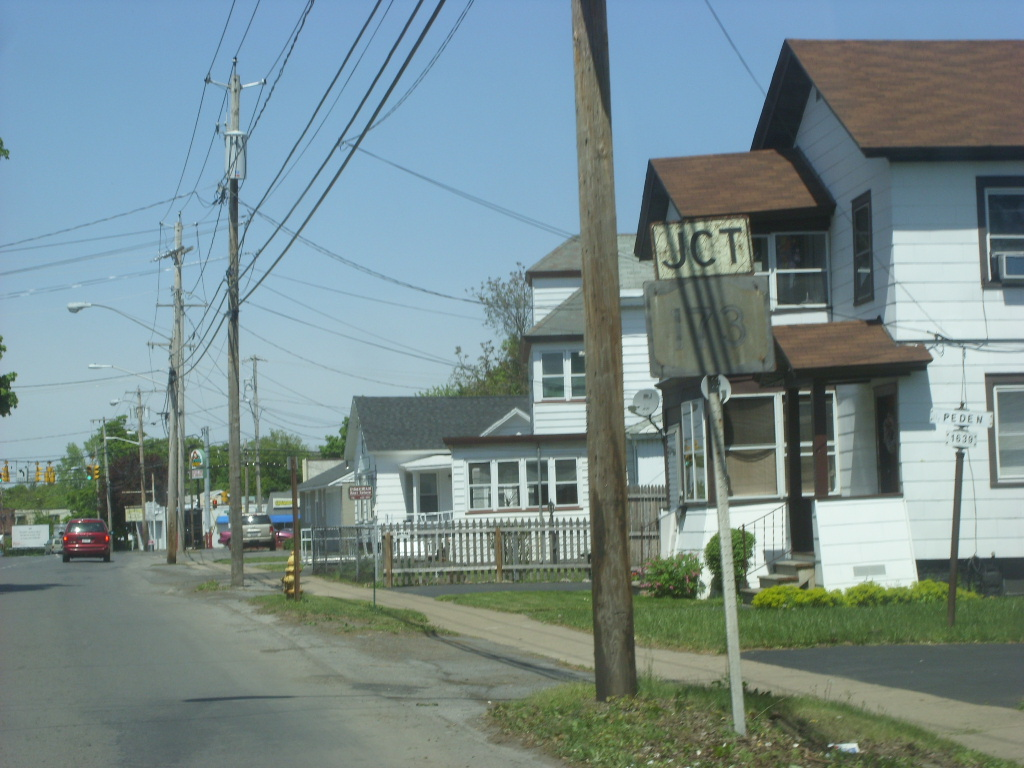
Route 80 northbound heading towards the intersection with Route 173 with old signage present

Although NY 80 follows an east–west alignment for most of its routing, two sections, located on its western and easternmost ends, are either signed as north–south (as is the case in northern Otsego County and Montgomery County) or physically oriented from north to south (such as in central Onondaga County).

=== Central Onondaga County ===
NY 80 begins at an intersection with NY 175 in southern Syracuse. The route, named Valley Drive, proceeds south through a largely residential area of Syracuse, following the path of Onondaga Creek through the area. 1 mile (1.6 km) to the south of NY 175 (and 1 mile (1.6 km) west of the interchange between Interstate 81 and Interstate 481), NY 80 intersects NY 173 (the old path of the Seneca Turnpike) near the southern city limits, which erroneously shows it as NY 80's western terminus in the 2017 route log. Past NY 173, NY 80 parallels U.S. Route 11, I-81, and Onondaga Creek as all four head south out of Syracuse. At the city line, NY 80 becomes South Onondaga Road.

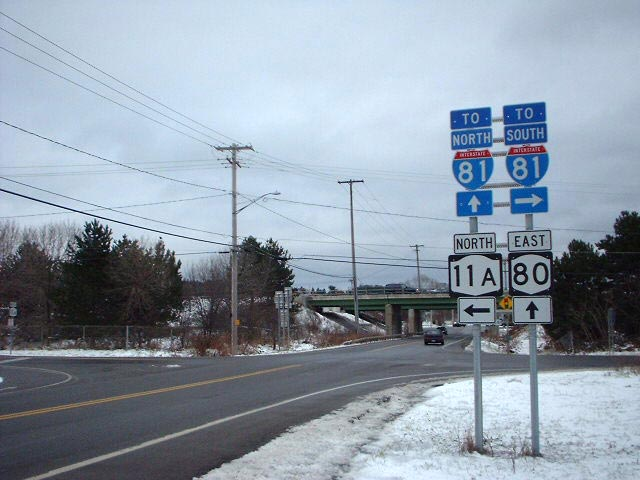
NY 11A's southern terminus at NY 80 in Tully

In Onondaga, south of Syracuse, NY 80 briefly enters the Onondaga Nation Territory, cutting across the northwestern corner of the reservation before turning to follow the western edge of the territory. NY 80 leaves to the southwest shortly after to serve South Onondaga and intersect U.S. Route 20 at Lords Corners. Past US 20, NY 80 continues south to Otisco (coming within 3 miles (5 km) of Otisco Lake), then curves southeast to the Tully hamlet of Vesper before turning fully to the east as it enters the village of Tully.

=== Tully to Sherburne ===
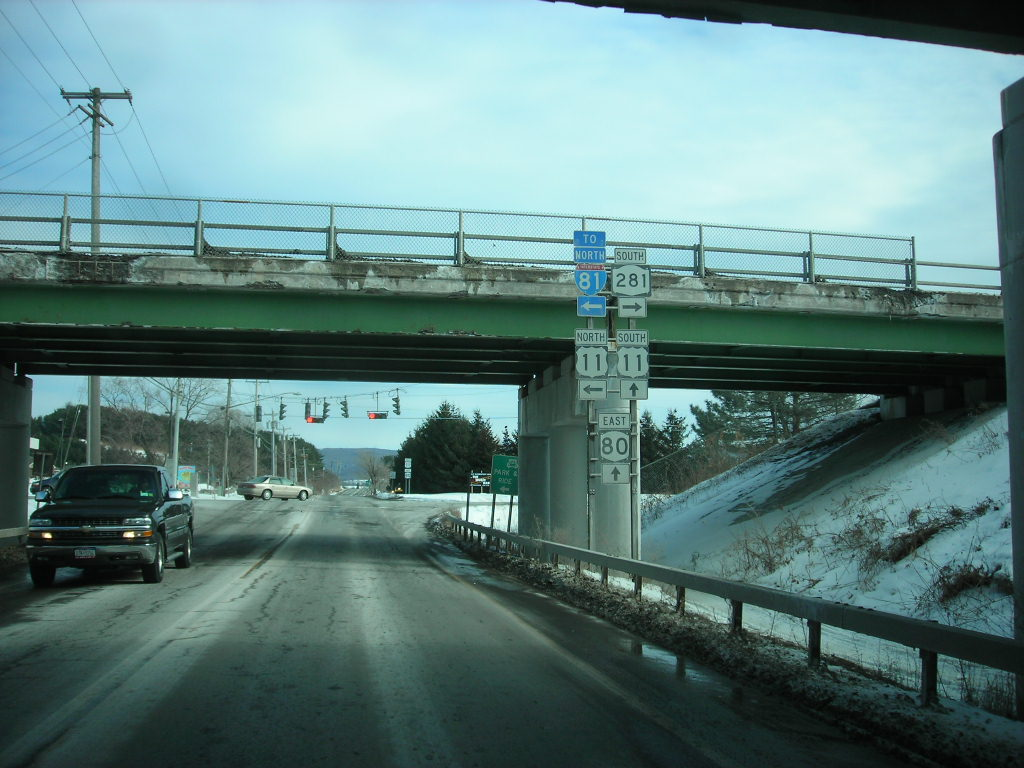
NY 80 at I-81, US 11 and NY 281 in Onondaga County

Just west of Tully, NY 80 intersects NY 11A, US 11, and NY 281 on opposite sides of an overpass carrying I-81 over NY 80. Here, all three routes, plus County Route 134 (CR 134) to the southwest, act as frontage roads for I-81 exit 14. US 11 joins NY 80 east of the interchange, following the route into Tully. US 11 heads south at the village center; NY 80, however, continues eastward, overlapping NY 91 near Fabius and NY 13 in western Madison County. Past NY 13, NY 80 continues southeast to Georgetown, where it meets NY 26. The two routes conjoin and head south into Chenango County before separating shortly after crossing the county line. Within Chenango County, NY 80 largely follows an east–west routing with a slight curve to the southeast. Incorporated municipalities 80 passes through within Chenango County include Smyrna, Sherburne, and New Berlin. East of Smyrna, NY 80 continues east, then curves to the southeast as it approaches the Otsego County line, delimited by the Unadilla River.

=== Former Second Great Western Turnpike ===
After crossing over the Chenango River and into Sherburne, NY 80 intersects NY 12 and begins to follow the old path of the Second Great Western Turnpike across Central New York. The route continues east to Columbus, where NY 80 separates from the old routing of the turnpike, at an intersection with CR 25. From Columbus NY 80 heads southeast to intersect NY 8 north of New Berlin. NY 80 turns south onto NY 8, overlapping the route to New Berlin, where the routes split at the village center. Outside of New Berlin, NY 80 heads northeast to Edmeston, where it rejoins the routing of the Second Great Western Turnpike at an intersection with CR 20. From Edmeston NY 80 heads east to intersect NY 51 in West Burlington, creating a brief, 1-mile (1.6 km) long concurrency between the two routes. Soon after NY 51 splits off NY 80 and continues north toward West Winfield.

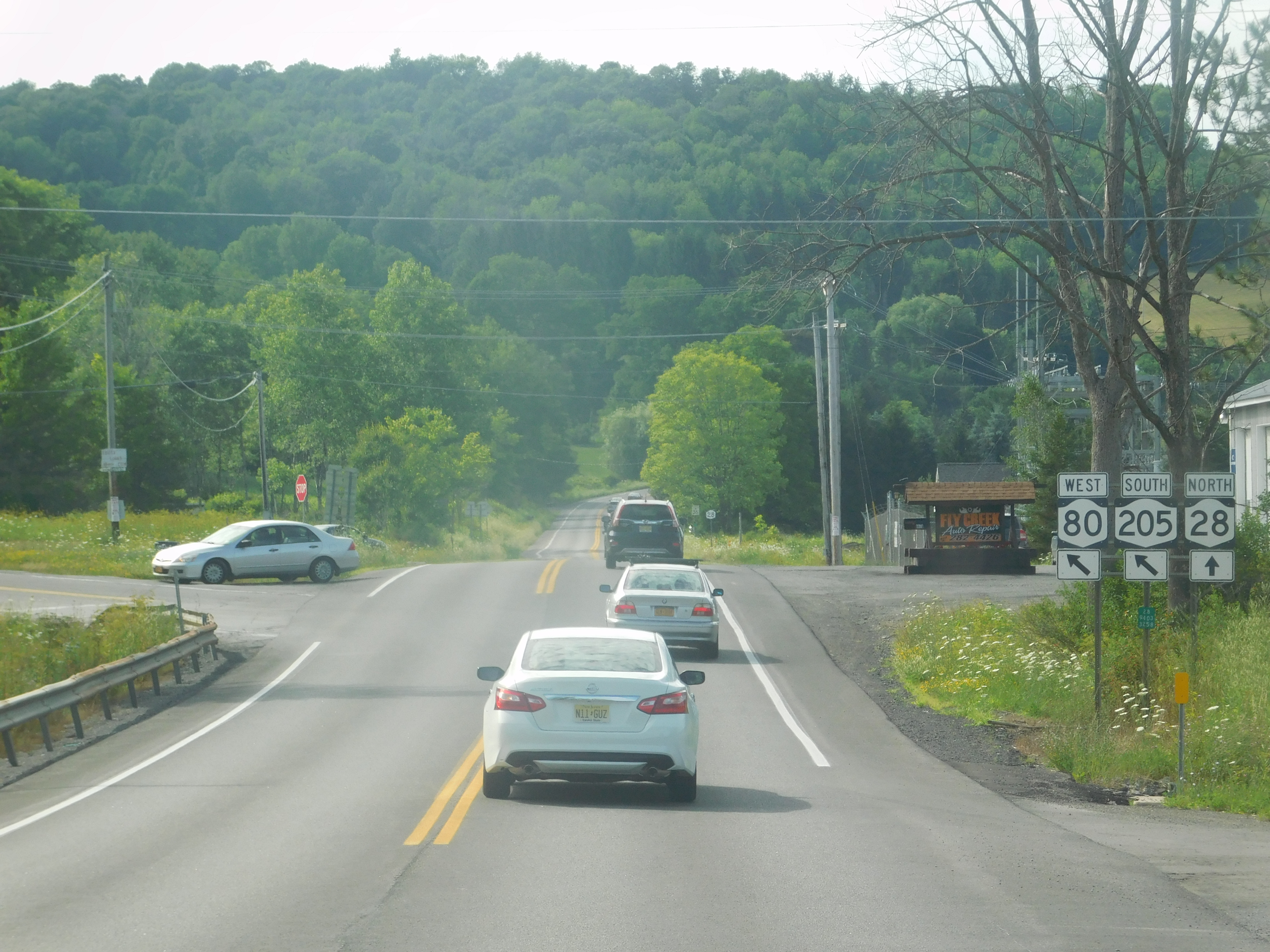
West end of NY 80 and NY 28 overlap at NY 205

NY 80 heads due east from NY 51 to Otsego, where it meets NY 205. NY 205 joins NY 80 eastward into a small valley surrounding Oaks Creek, where the two routes meet NY 28. While NY 205 terminates here, NY 80 joins NY 28, following the route east across the creek and through the hamlet of Fly Creek.

To the east of Fly Creek, NY 28 and NY 80 ascend in elevation for a short distance prior to descending into a valley home to both the southern tip of Otsego Lake and the historic village of Cooperstown at its tip. Shortly after entering Cooperstown, the two routes split as NY 28 turns south at Chestnut Street, following the roadway out of the village toward Oneonta. NY 80, however, turns north onto Chestnut and continues into the heart of the village, where it intersects Main Street, a street lined with shops catering to tourists who visit the nearby National Baseball Hall of Fame. At this intersection, the Second Great Western Turnpike turned east; however, NY 80 continues north on Chestnut for another block before turning onto Lake Street and following the street out of the village.

=== Cooperstown to Nelliston ===
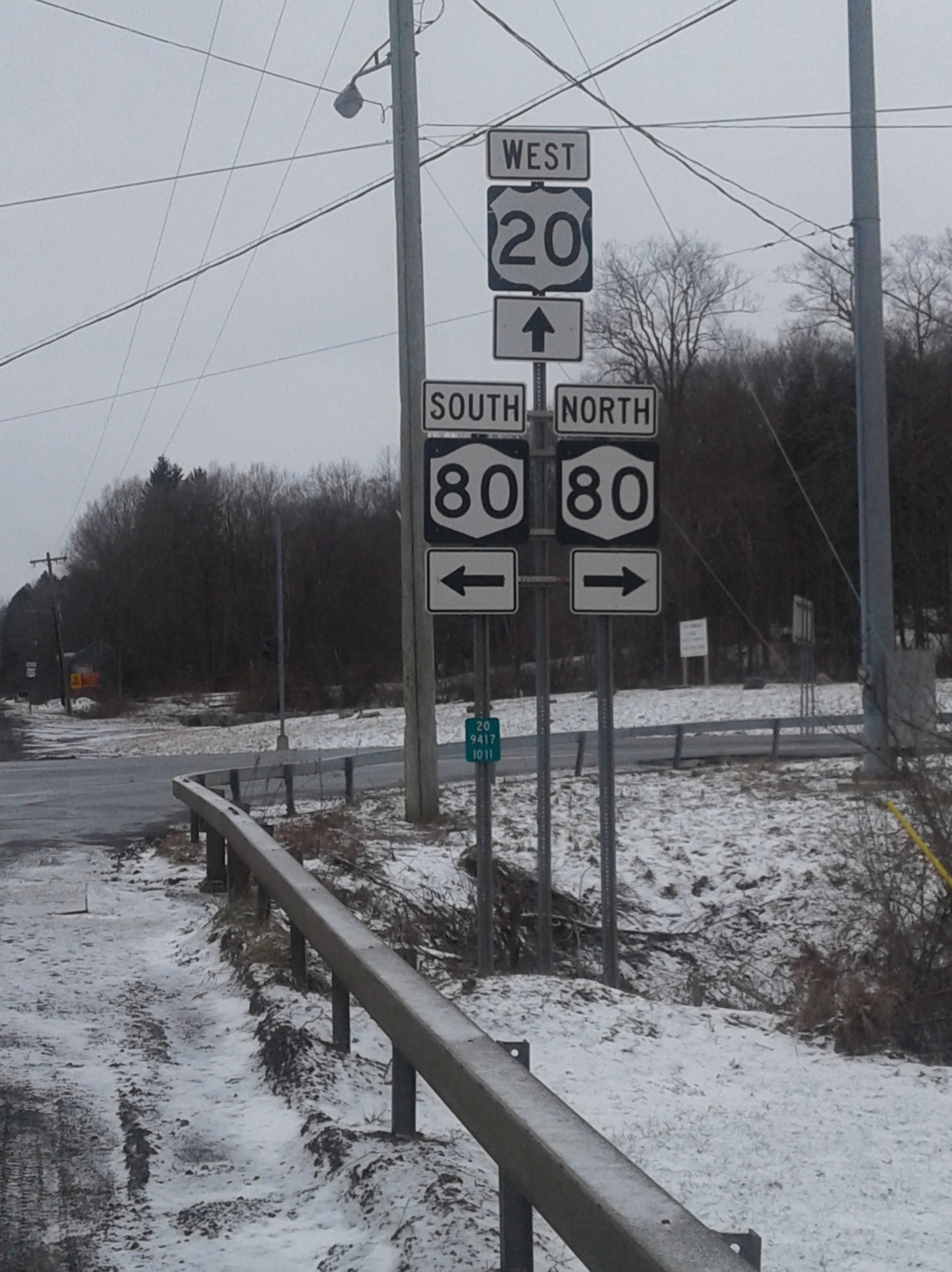
NY 80 and US 20 shields

Outside of Cooperstown, NY 80 heads north along the western edge of Otsego Lake, passing by both the Fenimore Art Museum and the Fenimore Farm & Country Village just north of Cooperstown, as well as the Glimmerglass Opera further up the road. Near the northern tip of the lake in Springfield, NY 80 intersects US 20 (the former Cherry Valley Turnpike) for the second time, where it becomes signed as a north–south route. The route continues northward, although the progression becomes more northeasterly as it crosses into the rural southeastern corner of Herkimer County. NY 80's stay within the county is brief, passing through the hamlet of Van Hornesville, home of the Owen D. Young Central School, established by noted American industrialist Owen D. Young. Young also founded RCA (the Radio Corporation of America). The route features no additional points of interest other than an intersection with NY 168 located at the midpoint between where NY 80 traverses the Otsego and Montgomery County lines.

Upon entering Montgomery County, NY 80 heads east to Fort Plain, a village located on the Mohawk River (here serving as the path of the Erie Canal), and becomes Main Street. At Kellogg Street, NY 80 is joined by NY 163 for two blocks to an intersection with NY 5S (Canal Street) in the heart of the village, although NY 163 is signed as ending at NY 80. Here, NY 163 ends while NY 5S and NY 80 come together on Main Street for a short overlap to Hancock Street, where NY 5S turns southeast and continues toward Canajoharie. NY 80, however, continues through and out of the village to the northeast on Main, Willett, and River Streets. Once on River, NY 80 passes under the New York State Thruway (Interstate 90) and crosses the Mohawk River before terminating at NY 5 on the opposite bank in Nelliston.

== History ==
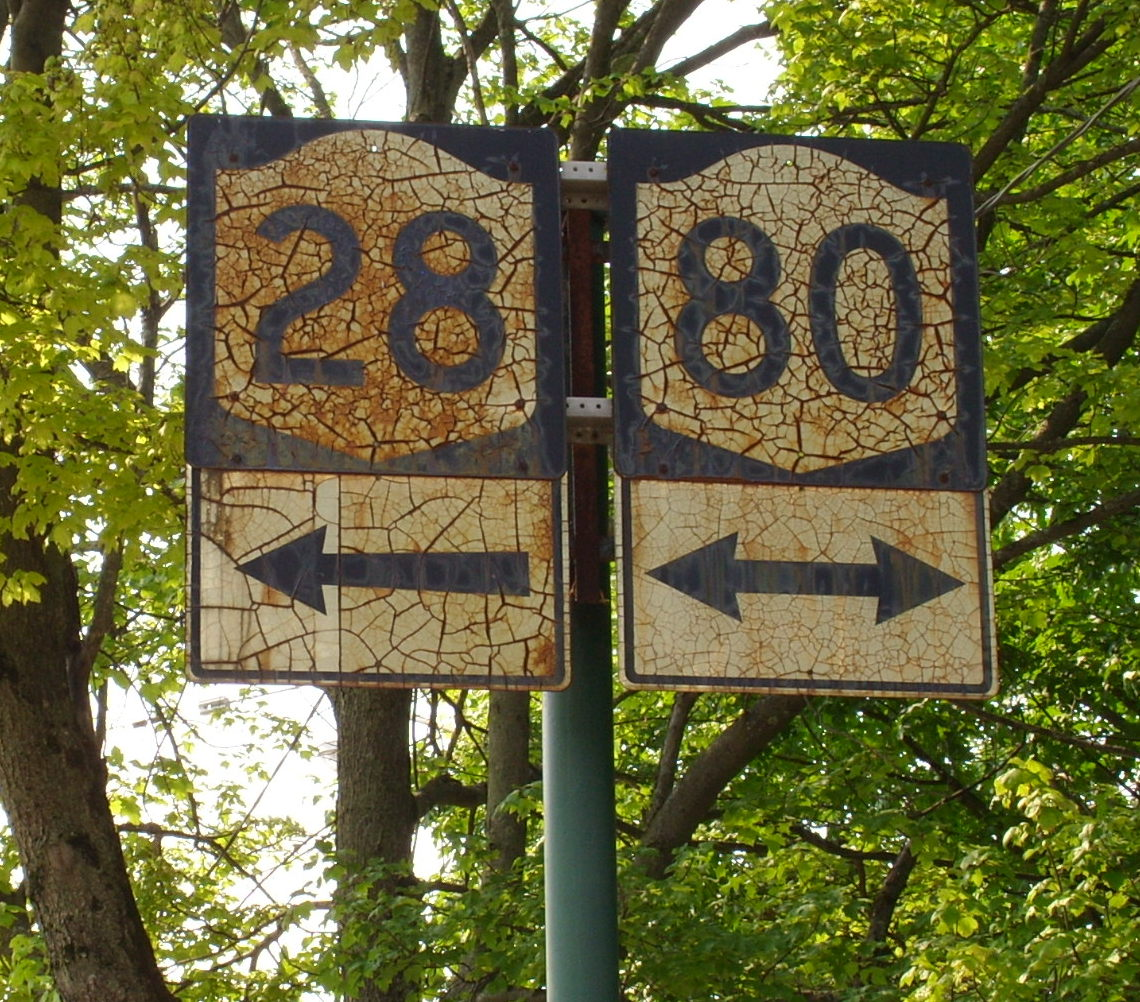
Old shields in Cooperstown for NY 28 and NY 80

The routing of most of modern NY 80 between Sherburne and Cooperstown was originally part of the Second Great Western Turnpike, an early toll road established in 1801. The road began at the eastern bank of the Chenango River in Sherburne and proceeded east through Cooperstown to Cherry Valley, where it connected to the First Great Western Turnpike and, later, the Third Great Western Turnpike. While what is now NY 80 dips south to serve New Berlin, the turnpike bypassed the settlement to the north, favoring a direct alignment between Columbus and Edmeston.

When the first set of posted routes in New York were assigned in 1924, none of the former turnpike was incorporated into the system; however, a road between Cooperstown and Springfield along the western edge of Otsego Lake was designated as part of NY 28. By 1926, a small segment of the ex-Second Great Western Turnpike between Edmeston and West Burlington was signed as part of NY 44. The NY 80 designation was created in the late 1920s and originally assigned to a previously unnumbered roadway between U.S. Route 20 in Springfield and NY 10A in Indian Lake via Nelliston and Speculator. North of Nelliston, NY 80 followed what is now NY 10 and NY 30. From Arietta to Speculator, NY 80 overlapped NY 54 (now NY 8).

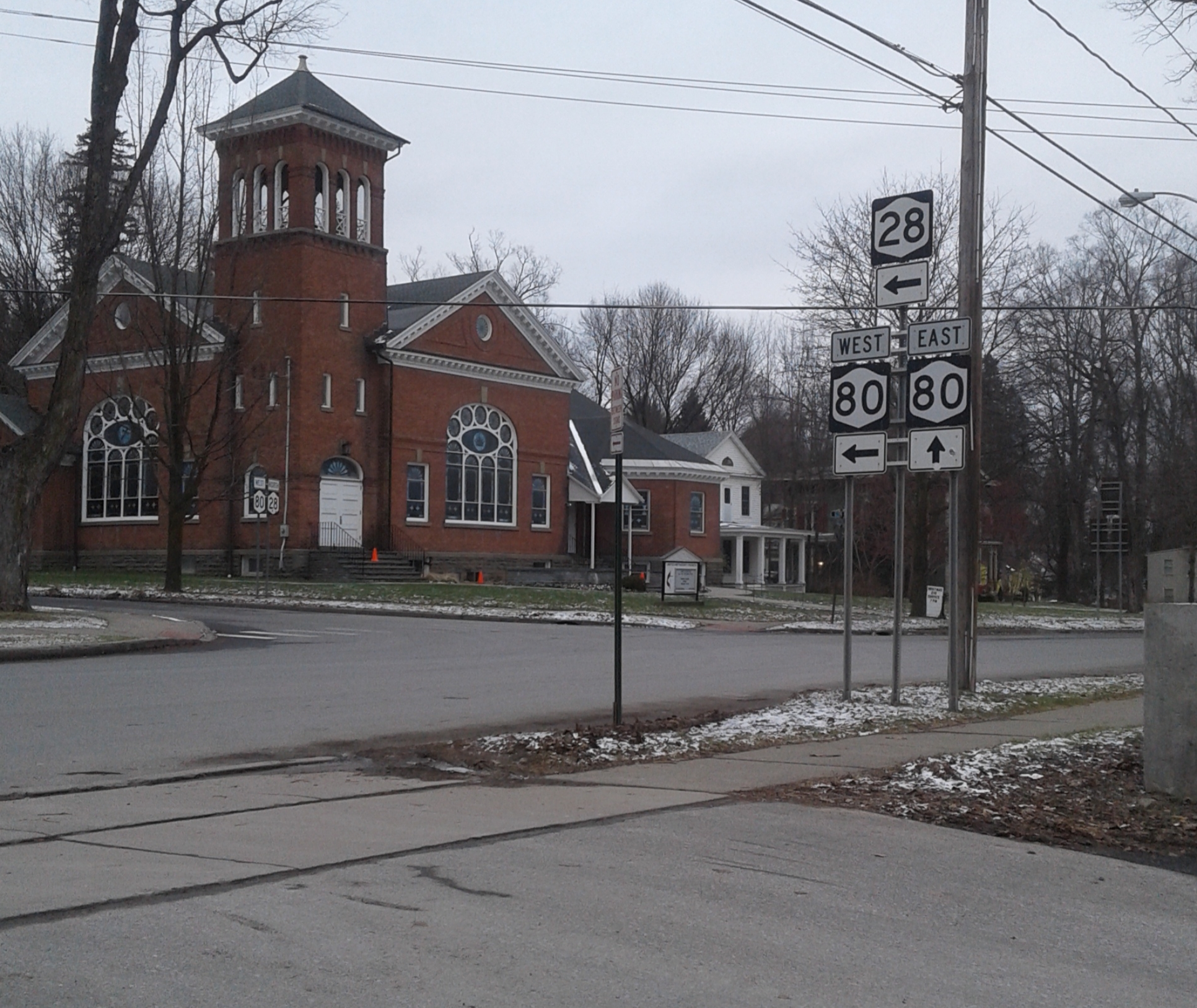
East end of NY 28 and NY 80 concurrency. NY 28 originally continued north here along NY 80 east before 1930

In the 1930 renumbering of state highways in New York, NY 80 was truncated to its current eastern terminus in Nelliston; however, it was also extended southward and westward to NY 173 in Syracuse, replacing NY 28 from Springfield to Cooperstown and NY 44 from New Berlin to West Burlington. From Sherburne to Columbus and from West Burlington to Cooperstown, NY 80 utilized a previously unnumbered roadway that roughly followed the former alignment of the Second Great Western Turnpike. The remainder of the roadway between Syracuse and Sherburne, and from Columbus to New Berlin, was also previously unnumbered. NY 80 was extended northward to its present terminus at NY 175 by 1932.

The 2.5 miles (4.0 km) portion of NY 80 between Vincent Corners Road (CR 178) and the Madison County line was initially maintained by Onondaga County. On April 1, 1980, ownership and maintenance of this section of the route was transferred from the county to the state of New York as part of a highway maintenance swap between the two levels of government.

== Major intersections ==
County	Location	mi	km	Destinations	Notes
Onondaga	Syracuse	0.00	0.00	NY 175 (South Avenue)	Western terminus
Onondaga	Syracuse	1.21	1.95	NY 173 (West Seneca Turnpike)	
Onondaga	Onondaga	9.67	15.56	US 20	Hamlet of Lords Corners
Onondaga	Town of Tully	20.16	32.44	NY 11A north / Lake Road To I-81 south – Binghamton, Cortland	Southern terminus of NY 11A; to exit 14 (I-81)
Onondaga	Town of Tully	20.18	32.48	US 11 north to I-81 north – Syracuse NY 281 south	Western terminus of US 11 / NY 80 overlap; to exit 14 (I-81); northern terminus of NY 281
Onondaga	Village of Tully	20.83	33.52	US 11 south (State Street)	Eastern terminus of US 11 / NY 80 overlap
Onondaga	Town of Fabius	24.36	39.20	NY 91 south (Apulia-Truxton Road)	Western terminus of NY 80 / NY 91 overlap; hamlet of Apulia
Onondaga	Village of Fabius	27.67	44.53	NY 91 north (Pompey Street)	Eastern terminus of NY 80 / NY 91 overlap
Madison	Town of Cazenovia	34.29	55.18	NY 13 north – Cazenovia	Northern terminus of NY 13 / NY 80 overlap; hamlet of New Woodstock
Madison	Town of DeRuyter	37.73	60.72	NY 13 south – DeRuyter	Southern terminus of NY 13 / NY 80 overlap; hamlet of Sheds
Madison	Georgetown	43.85	70.57	NY 26 north – Eaton	Northern terminus of NY 26 / NY 80 overlap
Chenango	Otselic	47.43	76.33	NY 26 south – South Otselic	Southern terminus of NY 26 / NY 80 overlap
Chenango	Village of Sherburne	60.72	97.72	NY 12 – Norwich, Earlville	
Chenango	Town of New Berlin	71.61	115.25	NY 8 north – Bridgewater, Utica	Northern terminus of NY 8 / NY 80 overlap; hamlet of Five Corners
Chenango	Village of New Berlin	72.88	117.29	NY 8 south	Southern terminus of NY 8 / NY 80 overlap
Otsego	Burlington	83.92	135.06	NY 51 south – Morris	Hamlet of West Burlington; western terminus of NY 51 / NY 80 overlap
Otsego	Burlington	84.98	136.76	NY 51 north – West Winfield	Eastern terminus of NY 51 / NY 80 overlap
Otsego	Otsego	91.68	147.54	NY 205 south – Hartwick, Laurens, Oneonta	Western terminus of NY 80 / NY 205 overlap
Otsego	Otsego	93.60	150.63	NY 28 north / NY 205 – Richfield Springs	Eastern terminus of NY 80 / NY 205 overlap; western terminus of NY 28 / NY 80 overlap; northern terminus of NY 205
Otsego	Cooperstown	98.87	159.12	NY 28 south (Chestnut Street)	Eastern terminus of NY 28 / NY 80 overlap
Otsego	Springfield	109.95	176.95	US 20 – Richfield Springs, Cherry Valley	Hamlet of Springfield Center
Herkimer	Stark	118.21	190.24	NY 168 west	Eastern terminus of NY 168; hamlet of Starkville
Montgomery	Fort Plain	126.57	203.69	NY 163 east (Kellogg Street)	Western terminus of NY 80 / NY 163 overlap; signed western terminus of NY 163
Montgomery	Fort Plain	126.72	203.94	NY 5S west (Canal Street) NY 163 ends	Eastern terminus of NY 163 overlap; western terminus of NY 5S overlap; western terminus of NY 163
Montgomery	Fort Plain	126.74	203.97	NY 5S east (Hancock Street) to I-90 / New York Thruway	Northern terminus of NY 80 overlap
Montgomery	Nelliston	127.32	204.90	NY 5 (Main Street) – Palatine Bridge, St. Johnsville	Northern terminus
1.000 mi = 1.609 km; 1.000 km = 0.621 mi: Concurrency terminus

== See also ==
- List of county routes in Madison County, New York
