= New York State Route 11A =

Highway in New York

New York State Route 11A
- Map of Central New York with NY 11A highlighted in red

Route information
- Auxiliary route of US 11
- Maintained by NYSDOT and the Onondaga Reservation
- Length: 13.11 mi (21.10 km)
- Existed: 1930–present

Major junctions
- South end: NY 80 in Tully
- North end: US 11 in Onondaga

Location
- Country: United States
- State: New York
- Counties: Onondaga

Highway system
- New York Highways; Interstate; US; State; Reference; Parkways
← US 11	→ NY 11B

New York State Route 11A (NY 11A) is a 13.11-mile (21.10 km) state highway in Onondaga County, New York, in the United States. It is an alternate route of U.S. Route 11 (US 11), beginning at an intersection with NY 80 in the town of Tully just west of where NY 80 crosses US 11. The route heads to the north, running along Onondaga Creek and passing through the Onondaga Reservation before ending at a junction with US 11 in Nedrow, a neighborhood just south of the Syracuse city limits. NY 11A was assigned as part of the 1930 renumbering of state highways in New York and has not been substantially altered since.

== Route description ==
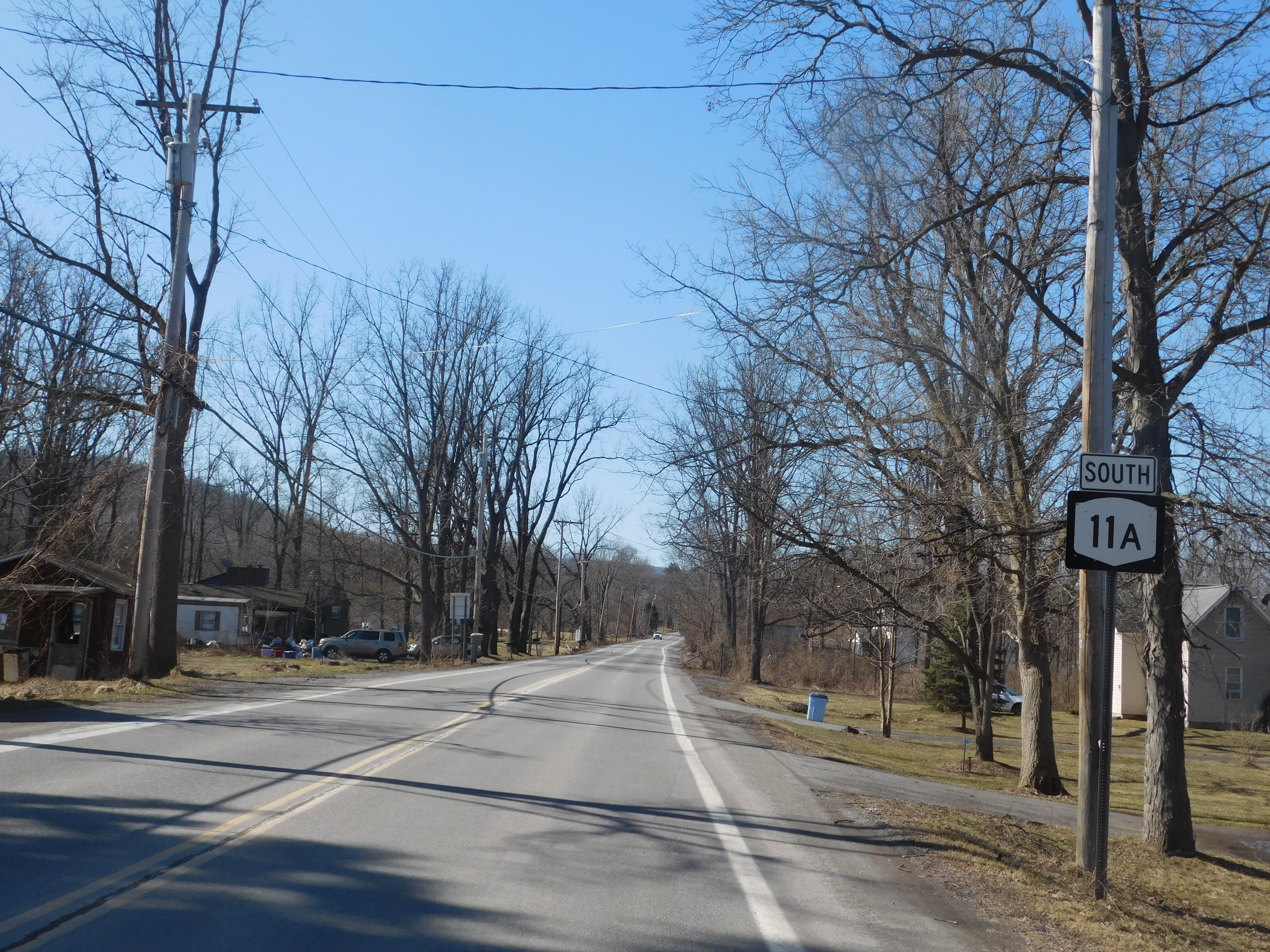
NY 11A southbound in Indian Village

NY 11A begins west of the village of Tully at an intersection with NY 80 near its exit with Interstate 81 (I-81) in the hamlet of Tully Center. Here, the route also connects to Lake Road (unsigned County Route 134 or CR 134), a local highway leading south to on-ramps for I-81 southbound and a chain of waterbodies known as the Tully Lakes. NY 11A proceeds northward from NY 80 as a two-lane unnamed road, connecting to the end of a ramp from I-81 southbound before curving northwestward into a rural area of the town. The highway runs through alternating stretches of open, lightly developed terrain and undeveloped woodlands, meeting Solvay Road (CR 238) as it descends into Tully Valley, a wide gully surrounding Onondaga Creek. The route heads north along the eastern edge of the isolated valley, following the creek into the adjacent town of LaFayette.

Across the town line, NY 11A intersects Otisco Road (CR 246) and passes several farms on its way to the hamlet of Cardiff. Here, the route runs past a line of homes prior to passing under US 20 at the northern edge of the community. Outside of Cardiff, the highway becomes known as Syracuse–Tully Valley Road as it slowly curves to the northwest, matching a similar turn in the course of the creek and its valley. As the road traverses another stretch of cultivated fields, it meets Field Lane, a short connector providing access between NY 11A and US 20. Past this point, NY 11A serves little more than farms before it enters the Onondaga Reservation. At this point, maintenance of the route shifts from the New York State Department of Transportation (NYSDOT) to the Onondaga Nation.

Inside the Onondaga territory, the route initially serves only a handful of scattered homes separated by long stretches of dense forests. After 2 miles (3.2 km), however, the road bends to the northeast and enters the town of Onondaga and the hamlet of Indian Village, the main population center of the reservation. NY 11A quickly runs through the linear community, crossing Hemlock Creek on its way to another lightly developed, mostly wooded stretch along the east bank of Onondaga Creek. The route passes only a handful of isolated homes before ending at an intersection with US 11 on the northern edge of the reservation. The junction is located just south of the hamlet of Nedrow, located along US 11 between the Onondaga territory and the Syracuse city line.

== History ==
On November 12, 1908, the state of New York awarded a contract to rebuild 4.44 miles (7.15 km) of roads in Onondaga County, including the section of modern NY 11A between Solvay Road and the Tully–LaFayette town line. The project cost $47,094 to complete (equivalent to $1.65 million in 2024), and the reconstructed highways were added to the state highway system on November 20, 1909. The remaining state-maintained portions of what is now NY 11A were taken over by the state in the mid-1920s. NY 11A was assigned as part of the 1930 renumbering of state highways in New York to its current alignment, with the northernmost part of the highway using roads maintained by the Onondaga Nation in order to connect to US 11. On June 27, 2006, the bridge carrying NY 11A over Hemlock Creek in Indian Village was closed, allowing construction to begin on a new, $2 million bridge. The project was completed by the end of the year.

== Major intersections ==
The entire route is in Onondaga County.

Location	mi	km	Destinations	Notes
Town of Tully	0.00	0.00	NY 80 to I-81 / US 11 / NY 281 – Tully, Highland Forest, Labrador Hollow	Southern terminus
LaFayette	6.65	10.70	To US 20 – Pompey, Skaneateles	Access via Field Lane; hamlet of Cardiff
Onondaga	13.11	21.10	US 11 (Salina Street)	Northern terminus; hamlet of Nedrow
1.000 mi = 1.609 km; 1.000 km = 0.621 mi
