= Tefft-Steadman House =

Historic house in New York, United States

- U.S. National Register of Historic Places
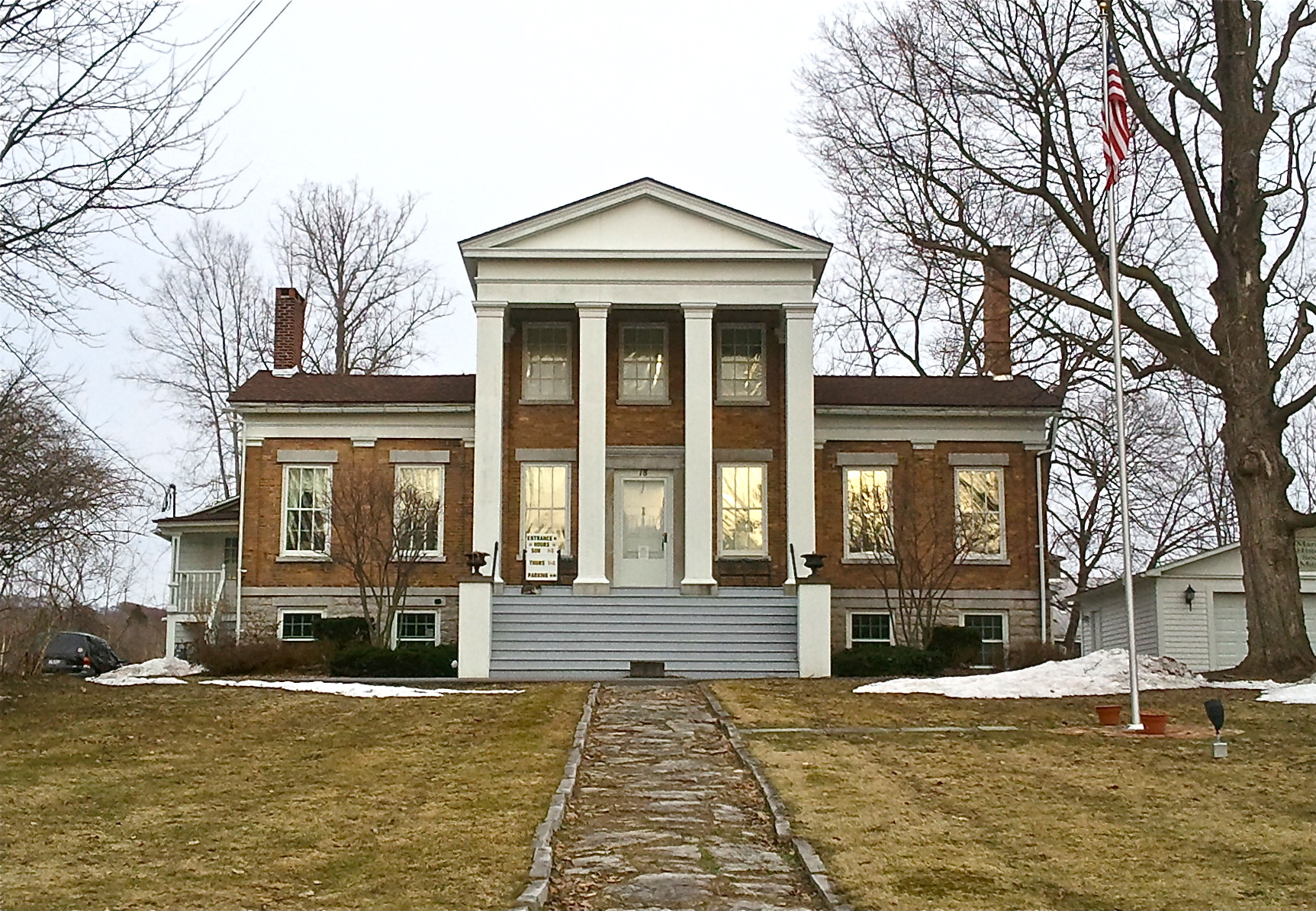

- Location within New York Location within the United States
- Location: 18 North St., Marcellus, New York
- Coordinates: 42°59′18″N 76°20′23″W
- Area: 0.6 acres (0.24 ha)
- Built: 1835
- Architect: Lafever, Minard
- Architectural style: Greek Revival
- NRHP reference No.: 07001125
- Added to NRHP: October 31, 2007

The Tefft-Steadman House in Marcellus, New York is a Greek Revival-style house that was designed by major architect Minard Lafever. (Or is it just from one of his pattern books?)

It was built in 1835, apparently faithfully implementing a design from architect Minard Lafever's pattern-book, and was listed on the National Register of Historic Places in 2007.

The house is now operated as a local history museum by the Marcellus Historical Society.
