= Marcellus, New York =

Town in New York, United States

Marcellus
- Town
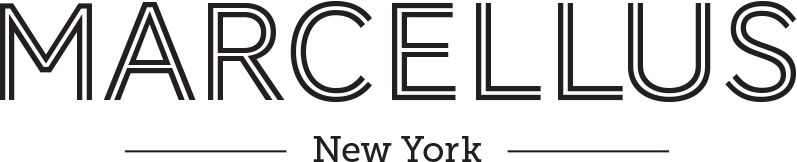
- Logo

- Location in Onondaga County and the state of New York.

- Location of New York in the United States
- Coordinates: 42°58′56″N 076°20′24″W
- Country: United States
- State: New York
- County: Onondaga

Government
  - Town Supervisor: Laurie Stevens (R) Town Council: Donald G. Sherman (R); Grace E. Bowhall (R); Eric D. Daggett (R); Kevin F. O'Hara (D); Abby K. O'Brien (D)

Area
  - Total: 32.58 sq mi (84.39 km^{2})
  - Land: 32.44 sq mi (84.03 km^{2})
  - Water: 0.14 sq mi (0.36 km^{2})
- Elevation: 1,024 ft (312 m)

Population (2020)
  - Total: 6,066
  - Density: 187.0/sq mi (72.19/km^{2})
- Time zone: UTC-5 (EST)
  - Summer (DST): UTC-4 (EDT)
- FIPS code: 36-067-45491
- FIPS code: 36-45491
- GNIS feature ID: 979196
- Website: marcellusny.com

Marcellus is a town in Onondaga County, New York, United States. As of the 2020 Census, the population was 6,066. The town was probably named after Marcus Claudius Marcellus, a Roman general, by a clerk interested in the Classics.

The Marcellus Formation is a vast geological layer of shale spanning Pennsylvania, West Virginia and parts of other states and Ontario, which is named for an outcropping in or near Marcellus.

The Town of Marcellus contains a village also named Marcellus. The town and village are southwest of Syracuse.

== Geography ==
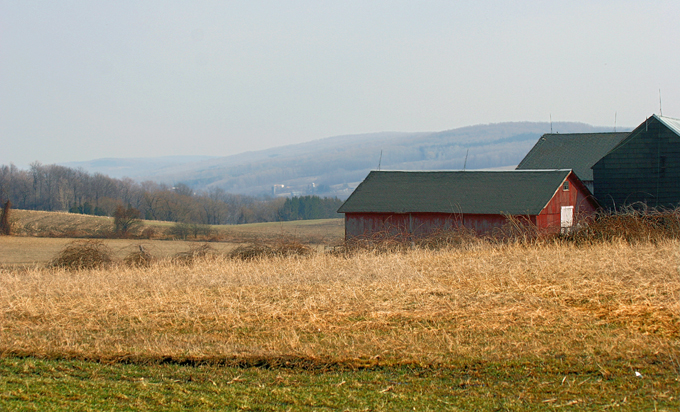
Marcellus Countryside (Rose Hill)

According to the United States Census Bureau, the town has a total area of 32.7 square miles (84.6 km^{2}), of which 32.5 square miles (84.3 km^{2}) is land and 0.1 square mile (0.3 km^{2}) (0.40%) is water.

US 20 is an east–west highway through the southern part of the town. NY 175 is an east–west highway and intersects with NY 174 at Marcellus village.

Marcellus is at the eastern end of the Finger Lakes District and is at the northern end of Otisco Lake. High hills, deep valleys, lake and streams, make the town remarkably scenic. Nine Mile Creek is a noted trout stream where New York State provides several access areas. Marcellus Park, which was once an Onondaga County Park, was taken over by the Town of Marcellus in 1993. The village of Marcellus is one of 15 villages in Onondaga County. Baltimore Woods Nature Center is nearby.

== History ==
The territory was part of the lands of the Onondaga tribe. Marcellus was a named township in the former Central New York Military Tract. It was first settled by outsiders circa 1794.

The town was formed in 1794; the Town of Geddes was removed in 1798. The township of Camillus was taken off in 1799. Otisco was removed in 1806. In 1830, the western part of the town was used for the new Town of Skaneateles. Marcellus regained territory in 1840 from Spafford and Otisco.

The Tefft-Steadman House was listed on the National Register of Historic Places in 2007.

== Demographics ==
Historical population
Census	Pop.	Note	%±
1820	6,503		—
1830	2,626		−59.6%
1840	2,726		3.8%
1850	2,759		1.2%
1860	2,908		5.4%
1870	2,337		−19.6%
1880	2,678		14.6%
1890	2,739		2.3%
1900	2,581		−5.8%
1910	2,826		9.5%
1920	2,854		1.0%
1930	2,993		4.9%
1940	3,046		1.8%
1950	3,607		18.4%
1960	4,527		25.5%
1970	5,744		26.9%
1980	6,180		7.6%
1990	6,465		4.6%
2000	6,319		−2.3%
2010	6,210		−1.7%
2020	5,866		−5.5%
U.S. Decennial Census

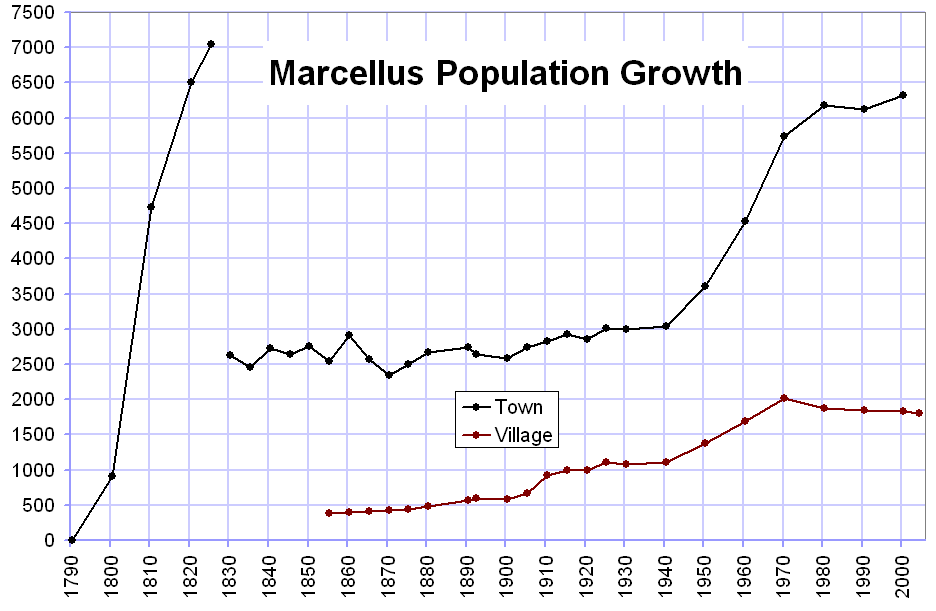
Population of the Town and Village of Marcellus from 1790 to 2004. The rapid decline between 1825 and 1830 was due to both a decrease in the area of the town and the general population shift westward.

As of the census of 2000, there were 6,319 people, 2,378 households, and 1,773 families residing in the town. The population density was 194.1 inhabitants per square mile (74.9/km^{2}). There were 2,488 housing units at an average density of 76.4 per square mile (29.5/km^{2}). The racial makeup of the town was 98.31% White, 0.41% Black or African American, 0.30% Native American, 0.22% Asian, 0.02% Pacific Islander, 0.06% from other races, and 0.68% from two or more races. Hispanic or Latino of any race were 0.84% of the population.

There were 2,378 households, out of which 37.1% had children under the age of 18 living with them, 63.3% were married couples living together, 8.0% had a female householder with no husband present, and 25.4% were non-families. 22.3% of all households were made up of individuals, and 9.5% had someone living alone who was 65 years of age or older. The average household size was 2.66 and the average family size was 3.14.

In the town, the population was spread out, with 28.2% under the age of 18, 6.0% from 18 to 24, 27.0% from 25 to 44, 25.6% from 45 to 64, and 13.2% who were 65 years of age or older. The median age was 39 years. For every 100 females, there were 95.3 males. For every 100 females age 18 and over, there were 92.7 males.

The median income for a household in the town was $51,881, and the median income for a family was $58,188. Males had a median income of $40,541 versus $32,234 for females. The per capita income for the town was $25,628. About 2.5% of families and 3.2% of the population were below the poverty line, including 3.9% of those under age 18 and 0.5% of those age 65 or over.

== Communities in the Town of Marcellus ==
- Clintonville – A hamlet in the southwestern part of the town on US-20.
- Marcellus – The Village of Marcellus is at the junction of NY-174 and NY-175.
- Marcellus Falls – A hamlet north of Marcellus village on NY-174, located at the northern town line.
- Marietta – A hamlet north of Otisco Lake on NY-174.
- Pumpkin Hollow – A valley at the eastern town line.
- Rose Hill – A hamlet west of Marietta.
- Shamrock A hamlet near the western town line, west of Marietta.
- Thorn Hill – A hamlet southwest of Marietta by the southern town line.
- Sage Meadows- A hamlet near the northeastern town line.
