= Seneca Turnpike =

Road in New York State, U.S.

The Seneca Turnpike was a historic turnpike between Utica and Canandaigua, New York. It was operated by the Seneca Road Company, which was formed to improve and maintain the main road, formerly known as the Genesee Road. The road was 157 miles (253 km) long, at the time, the longest toll road in the state.

The improvements quickly led to the building of many hotels and inns along the route and was a catalyst of commerce.

Toll gates were at 10-mile (16 km) intervals. The company was profitable and paid dividends of 10 percent for 30 years. Competition from newly constructed railroads in the late 1830s reduced traffic.

In 1846, with revenues insufficient to maintain the turnpike, let alone pay dividends to shareholders, the company concluded it could no longer compete with the Erie Canal. It gave back its charter, the company was dissolved, and the roadway reverted to a public road. Stretches of New York State Route 5 run along the path of the old roadway, and are still called the Seneca Turnpike or Old Seneca Turnpike in some places.
