= National Register of Historic Places listings in Onondaga County, New York =

Location of Onondaga County in New York

There are 181 properties and districts listed on the National Register of Historic Places in Onondaga County, New York. Of those, 56 are outside Syracuse, and are listed here, while the rest are covered in National Register of Historic Places listings in Syracuse, New York. One property, the New York State Barge Canal, spans the city and the remainder of the county. The locations of National Register properties and districts (at least for all showing latitude and longitude coordinates below) may be seen in a map by clicking on "Map of all coordinates".

This National Park Service list is complete through NPS recent listings posted May 22, 2026.

Contents: Counties in New York
Albany (Albany) – Allegany – Bronx – Broome – Cattaraugus – Cayuga – Chautauqua – Chemung – Chenango – Clinton – Columbia – Cortland – Delaware – Dutchess (Poughkeepsie, Rhinebeck) – Erie (Buffalo) – Essex – Franklin – Fulton – Genesee – Greene – Hamilton – Herkimer – Jefferson – Kings – Lewis – Livingston – Madison – Monroe (Rochester) – Montgomery – Nassau – New York (Below 14th Street, 14th to 59th Streets, 59th to 110th Streets, Above 110th Street, Islands) – Niagara (Niagara Falls) – Oneida – Onondaga (Syracuse) – Ontario – Orange – Orleans – Oswego – Otsego – Putnam – Queens – Rensselaer – Richmond – Rockland – St. Lawrence – Saratoga – Schenectady – Schoharie – Schuyler – Seneca – Steuben – Suffolk – Sullivan – Tioga – Tompkins – Ulster – Warren – Washington – Wayne – Westchester (Northern, Southern, New Rochelle, Peekskill, Yonkers) – Wyoming – Yates

== Current listings ==
=== Remainder of county ===
	Name on the Register	Image	Date listed	Location	City or town	Description
1	Alvord House	Alvord House	August 27, 1976 (#76001257)	Fred Sehr Park, North of Syracuse on Berwick Road; 43°05′19″N 76°08′01″W	Salina	Stone farmhouse of Alvord family, merchants in the salt manufacturing business of the Salina area in the early 19th century.
2	Baldwinsville Village Hall	Baldwinsville Village Hall	May 9, 1997 (#97000421)	16 W. Genesee St. 43°09′32″N 76°20′03″W	Baldwinsville	
3	Borodino District School #8	Borodino District School #8	January 4, 2007 (#06001206)	1845 Rose Hill Rd. 42°51′40″N 76°20′16″W	Borodino	
4	Borodino Hall	Borodino Hall	July 28, 2006 (#06000647)	1861 E. Lake Rd. 42°51′31″N 76°20′20″W	Borodino	
5	Dan Bradley House	Dan Bradley House	December 12, 1978 (#78001889)	59 South St. 42°58′35″N 76°20′24″W	Marcellus	
6	Brook Farm		December 18, 2003 (#03001304)	2870 W. Lake Rd. 42°54′58″N 76°25′47″W	Skaneateles	
7	Camillus Cutlery Company Headquarters	Camillus Cutlery Company Headquarters	August 28, 2018 (#100002836)	54 W Genesee St. 43°02′20″N 76°18′31″W	Camillus Village	Well-preserved 1925 daylight factory built for company that relocated upstate from New York City.
8	Camillus Union Free School	Camillus Union Free School	May 28, 1991 (#91000628)	Jct. of First and LeRoy Sts. 43°02′26″N 76°18′21″W	Camillus Village	
9	Carley Onondaga Site		January 10, 2011 (#10001127)	Address Restricted	Pompey	
10	Christ Church and Manlius Village Cemeteries	Christ Church and Manlius Village Cemeteries	January 25, 2007 (#06001298)	East Seneca St. 43°00′09″N 75°58′12″W	Manlius	
11	Church of the Good Shepherd	Church of the Good Shepherd	May 8, 1997 (#97000113)	NY 11A, south of its junction with Webster Rd., on the Onondaga Reservation; 42°56′42″N 76°09′43″W	Onondaga Indian Reservation	
12	Community Place	Community Place	April 20, 1979 (#79001611)	S of Skaneateles at 725 Sheldon Rd. 42°58′58″N 76°27′17″W	Skaneateles	
13	Mrs. I. L. Crego House	Mrs. I. L. Crego House	June 27, 2007 (#07000631)	7979 Crego Rd. 43°09′21″N 76°21′13″W	Baldwinsville	
14	Delphi Baptist Church	Delphi Baptist Church	August 24, 1979 (#79001610)	Oran-Delphi Rd. 42°52′38″N 75°54′48″W	Delphi Falls	
15	Delphi Village School	Delphi Village School	May 22, 1986 (#86001152)	East Rd. 42°52′31″N 75°54′54″W	Delphi Falls	
16	Drover's Tavern	Drover's Tavern	April 18, 2003 (#03000265)	4065 Pompey Hollow Rd. 42°58′04″N 75°54′57″W	Oran	
17	Elbridge Hydraulic Industry Archeological District		June 15, 1982 (#82003391)	Address Restricted	Elbridge	
18	Elbridge Village Historic District	Elbridge Village Historic District	January 24, 2002 (#01001494)	Roughly along NY 5 bet. Skaneatetes Creek and Carpenter's Brook; 43°02′06″N 76°26′49″W	Elbridge	
19	Charles Estabrook Mansion	Charles Estabrook Mansion	April 26, 1996 (#96000487)	7262 E. Genesee St. 43°01′42″N 76°01′16″W	Fayetteville	
20	Fabius Village Historic District	Fabius Village Historic District	November 22, 2000 (#00001409)	Roughly bounded by N. West St., Mill St., Keeney St., and Fabius Town Line; 42°50′05″N 75°59′12″W	Fabius	
21	First Baptist Church of Camillus	First Baptist Church of Camillus	June 8, 2001 (#01000573)	23 Genesee St. 43°02′19″N 76°18′29″W	Camillus Village	
22	James and Lydia Canning Fuller House	James and Lydia Canning Fuller House	July 3, 2003 (#03000595)	W. Genesee St. 42°56′41″N 76°26′22″W	Skaneateles	
23	Genesee Street Hill-Limestone Plaza Historic District	Genesee Street Hill-Limestone Plaza Historic District	July 29, 1982 (#82003392)	Roughly both sides of Genesee St., from Chapel St. to Limestone Plaza; 43°01′46″N 76°00′36″W	Fayetteville	
24	Lucius Gleason House	Lucius Gleason House	May 10, 1990 (#90000693)	314 Second St. 43°06′13″N 76°12′37″W	Liverpool	
25	Hazelhurst	Hazelhurst	May 28, 2010 (#10000302)	150 E. Genesee St. 42°56′39″N 76°25′08″W	Skaneateles	
26	Gen. Orrin Hutchinson House	Gen. Orrin Hutchinson House	April 13, 1973 (#73001233)	4311 W. Seneca Tpke. 42°59′41″N 76°12′57″W	Onondaga	
27	Indian Castle Village Site		January 10, 2011 (#10001126)	Address Restricted	Manlius	
28	Dr. John Ives House	Dr. John Ives House	August 29, 1985 (#85001938)	6575 E. Seneca Turnpike; 42°59′27″N 76°04′04″W	Jamesville	
29	Jordan Village Historic District	Jordan Village Historic District	September 15, 1983 (#83001753)	Roughly bounded by N. Main, S. Main, Elbridge, Clinton, Hamilton, Lawrence, and Mechanic Sts. 43°03′55″N 76°28′25″W	Jordan	
30	Kelsey-Davey Farm	Kelsey-Davey Farm	April 16, 1980 (#80004277)	NE of Skaneateles on Old Seneca Tpke. 42°59′01″N 76°23′23″W	Skaneateles	
31	Lakeview Cemetery	Lakeview Cemetery	March 13, 2017 (#100000755)	W. Genesee St. near Kane Ave. 42°56′38″N 76°26′24″W	Skaneateles	19th century public cemetery that took in earlier burial grounds and includes one of the few extant Cass Gilbert buildings outside New York City
32	Liverpool Cemetery	Liverpool Cemetery	May 26, 2015 (#15000267)	225 6th St. 43°06′33″N 76°12′35″W	Liverpool	Mid-19th century cemetery is final resting place of many residents, particularly immigrants
33	Manlius Village Historic District	Manlius Village Historic District	November 6, 1973 (#73001232)	Pleasant, Franklin, North, Clinton, and E. Seneca Sts. 43°00′11″N 75°58′31″W	Manlius	
34	Martisco Station	Martisco Station	April 5, 2007 (#07000292)	Martisco Rd., N of Lyons Rd. 43°01′02″N 76°20′09″W	Martisco	
35	Mottville Cemetery	Mottville Cemetery	April 22, 2021 (#100006476)	4275 Jordan Rd. 42°58′41″N 76°26′40″W	Skaneateles	Cemetery
36	Mycenae Schoolhouse	Mycenae Schoolhouse	August 11, 1983 (#83001754)	NY 5; 43°02′48″N 75°56′01″W	Manlius	
37	New York State Barge Canal	New York State Barge Canal	October 15, 2014 (#14000860)	Linear across county 43°09′21″N 76°20′01″W	Baldwinsville, Cicero, Clay, Elbridge, Geddes, Liverpool, Lysander, Salina, Van Buren	Successor to Erie Canal approved by state voters in early 20th century to compete with railroads.
38	Nine Mile Creek Aqueduct	Nine Mile Creek Aqueduct	May 17, 1976 (#76001256)	NE of Camillus on Thompson Rd. 43°03′32″N 76°17′09″W	Camillus	
39	Oran Community Church	Oran Community Church	January 24, 2002 (#01001503)	8560 Cazenovia Rd, NY 92; 42°58′44″N 75°56′09″W	Pompey	
40	Oran District No. 22 Schoolhouse	Oran District No. 22 Schoolhouse	August 6, 1998 (#98001002)	Jct. of NY 92 and Delphi Rd. 42°58′43″N 75°56′06″W	Oran, in Pompey	
41	Oswego-Oneida Streets Historic District	Oswego-Oneida Streets Historic District	July 29, 1982 (#82003390)	Oswego, East and West Sts., and Sunset Terr. 43°09′41″N 76°20′08″W	Baldwinsville	
42	Pompey Centre District No. 10 Schoolhouse	Pompey Centre District No. 10 Schoolhouse	August 6, 1998 (#98001007)	8354 US 20; 42°55′25″N 75°56′58″W	Pompey Center, in Pompey	
43	Pozzi Building		December 29, 2025 (#100012421)	1701 Milton Avenue; 43°03′39″N 76°12′14″W	Solvay	
44	Robinson Site (AO67-02-0001)		March 28, 1985 (#85000660)	Address Restricted	Brewerton	
45	Saint Mark's Church	Saint Mark's Church	March 9, 1997 (#97000114)	6492 E. Seneca Trnpk. 42°59′28″N 76°04′21″W	Jamesville	
46	Shepard Family Houses	Shepard Family Houses	December 22, 2015 (#15000923)	28 W. Genesee & 6 Hannum Sts. 42°56′44″N 76°25′55″W	Skaneateles	Houses of prominent local family, built 1848 and 1901 respectively, and carriage house which is now a bakery.
47	Shepard Settlement Cemetery	Shepard Settlement Cemetery	November 29, 2010 (#10000938)	Stump & Foster Rds; 42°59′42″N 76°23′40″W	Shepard Settlement	
48	Skaneateles Historic District	Skaneateles Historic District	May 10, 1984 (#84002818)	Jordan, Fennell, E. and W. Genesee Sts. 42°57′14″N 76°25′36″W	Skaneateles	
49	Reuel E. Smith House	Reuel E. Smith House	July 27, 1979 (#79001612)	28 W. Lake St. 42°56′31″N 76°26′05″W	Skaneateles	Designed by Alexander Jackson Davis
50	Levi Snell House	Levi Snell House	August 20, 1987 (#87001365)	416 Brooklea Dr. 43°02′05″N 76°00′30″W	Fayetteville	
51	Solvay Public Library	Solvay Public Library	October 31, 2007 (#07001124)	615 Woods Rd. 43°03′27″N 76°12′26″W	Solvay	
52	Southwood Two-Teacher School	Southwood Two-Teacher School	April 6, 2000 (#00000349)	4621 Barker Hill Rd. 42°59′42″N 76°06′34″W	Jamesville	
53	Stone Arabia School	Stone Arabia School	April 12, 2007 (#07000289)	6453 NY 31; 43°10′39″N 76°04′31″W	Cicero	
54	Tefft-Steadman House	Tefft-Steadman House	October 31, 2007 (#07001125)	18 North St. 42°59′18″N 76°20′23″W	Marcellus	
55	Whig Hill and Dependencies	Whig Hill and Dependencies	May 12, 1975 (#75001217)	E. of Plainville at jct. of W. Genesee and Gates Rds. 43°09′33″N 76°26′01″W	Plainville	
56	Wilcox Octagon House	Wilcox Octagon House	July 28, 1983 (#83001756)	5420 W. Genesee St. 43°02′28″N 76°16′42″W	Camillus	

== See also ==
- National Register of Historic Places listings in New York
- List of National Historic Landmarks in New York
