= Union Free School District =

School district in New York, United States

A Union Free School District is a school district in New York State governed by a board of education; in principle, it may contain multiple primary schools and a single high school, though in practice, there are Union Free School Districts that do not include any high school.

The term, dating from 1853, is unrelated to labor unions. It is related to a "union" of two or more common school districts; the initial idea was that the resulting united district could establish a high school to serve the graduates of the existing common schools. Many early union free districts were created to serve a municipality, and have the same boundaries as the municipality they serve. The original purpose was to provide for secondary education, but as of the early 21st century, thirty of 151 existing union free school districts provide only elementary education. Of those thirty districts, eleven belong to a central high school district, while the remaining ones partner with neighbouring districts to provide secondary education. Additionally, sixteen "special act" union-free districts exclusively serve children living in designated childcare institutions.

Under New York State's Education Law — EDN § 1703, Union Free School Districts must have an elected board of education (a.k.a. school board) with three to nine members. The board can shrink or grow over time within those limits, with the change made at an annual meeting of members of the constituency that elects the board. Advance notice must be given that being an agenda item for the meeting. A simple majority of the voters who attend the meeting can then confirm the change. Normally, such notice comes from the board itself, but if they refuse, then the state commissioner of education may specify how to give notice to the voters.

Several individual schools have "Union Free School" in their names, e.g., Camillus Union Free School.
