= Hazelhurst (Skaneateles, New York) =

Historic house in New York, United States

- U.S. National Register of Historic Places
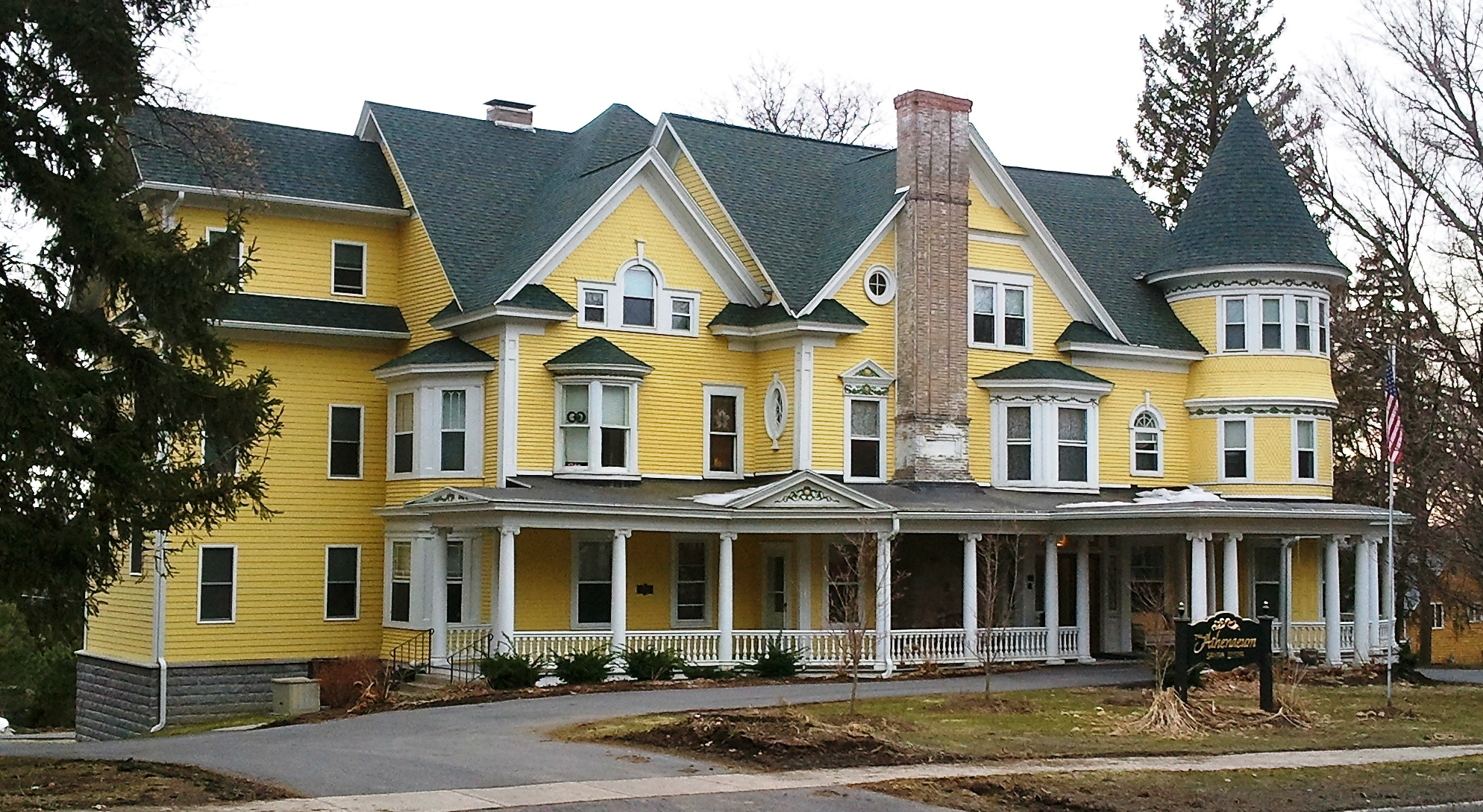
- Hazelhurst, March 2011

- Location within New York Location within the United States
- Interactive map showing Hazelhurst’s location
- Location: 150 E Genesee Street; Skaneateles, New York
- Coordinates: 42°56′46″N 76°25′8″W
- Area: 1 acre (0.40 ha)
- Built: c.1866, 1904
- Architect: Dent, Edward
- Architectural style: Queen Anne
- NRHP reference No.: 10000302
- Added to NRHP: May 28, 2010

Hazelhurst is a historic house located at 150 East Genesee Street in Skaneateles, New York. It was originally a small summer home built for William Loney about 1866, and enlarged and renovated in 1904. It had an extensive lawn stretching down to Skaneateles Lake, which was later split up into 30 separate building lots that now share a common lake access. Hazelhurst is a three-story, irregular plan, Queen Anne style balloon frame dwelling. It features a wraparound porch with Ionic order columns, multiple gabled roof, porte cochere, and corner tower with conical roof. The mansion is now used as a 14-bedroom home for the elderly called The Athenaeum.

The building was listed on the National Register of Historic Places in 2010.

== See also ==
- National Register of Historic Places listings in Onondaga County, New York
