= Mycenae, New York =

Mycenae
- hamlet
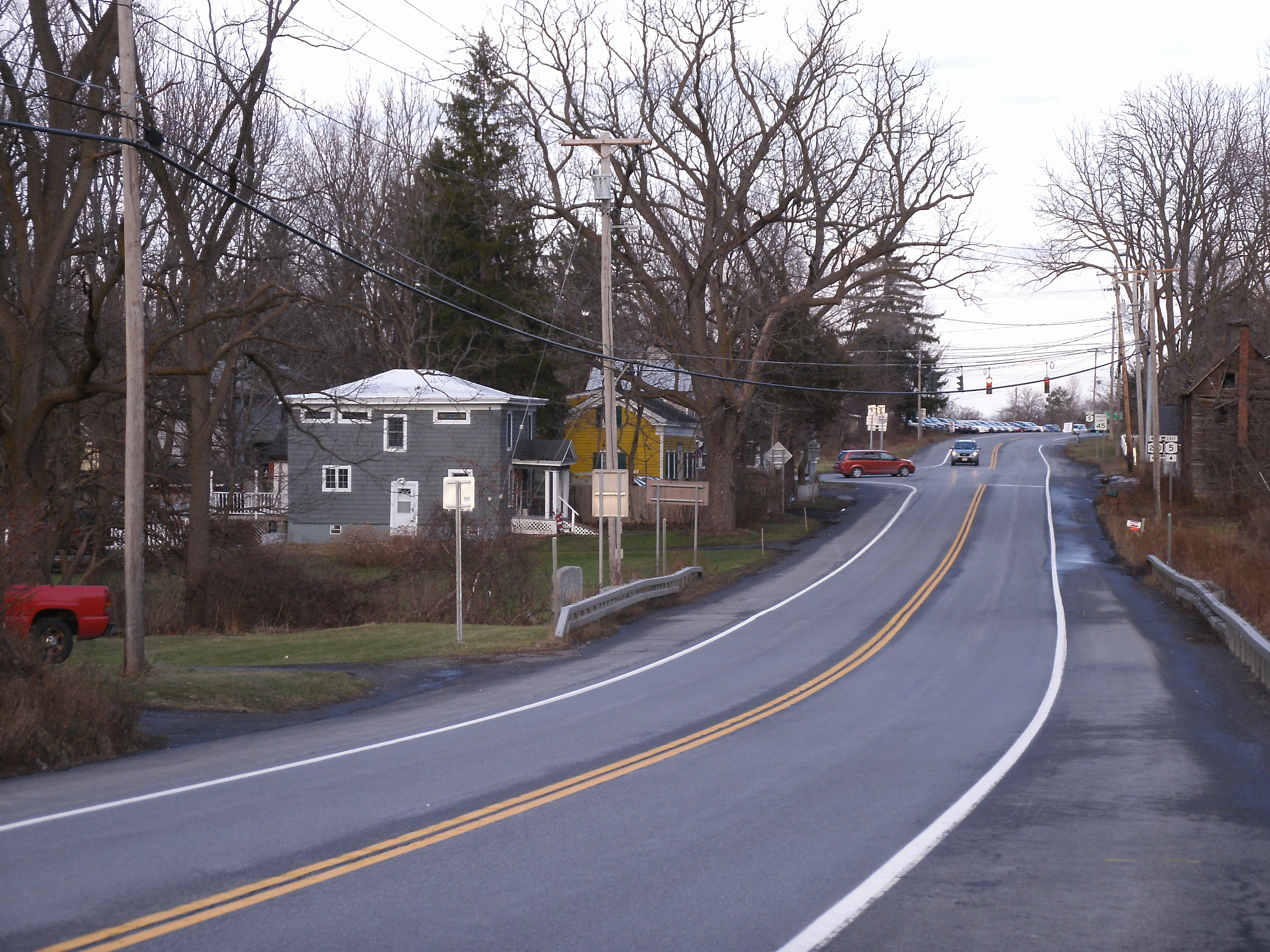
- Mycenae in 2009

- Location within the state of New York
- Coordinates: 43°2′56″N 75°55′50″W
- Country: United States
- State: New York
- County: Onondaga
- Time zone: UTC-5 (Eastern (EST))
  - Summer (DST): UTC-4 (EDT)
- ZIP codes: 13066

Mycenae is a hamlet in the Town of Manlius, New York, within Onondaga County, United States. It lies at the meeting point of New York Route 5 and Route 290. Mycenae is located at 43° 02' 56" North, 75° 55' 50" West. Presumably the hamlet was named after the ancient Greek city of Mycenae.

== History ==
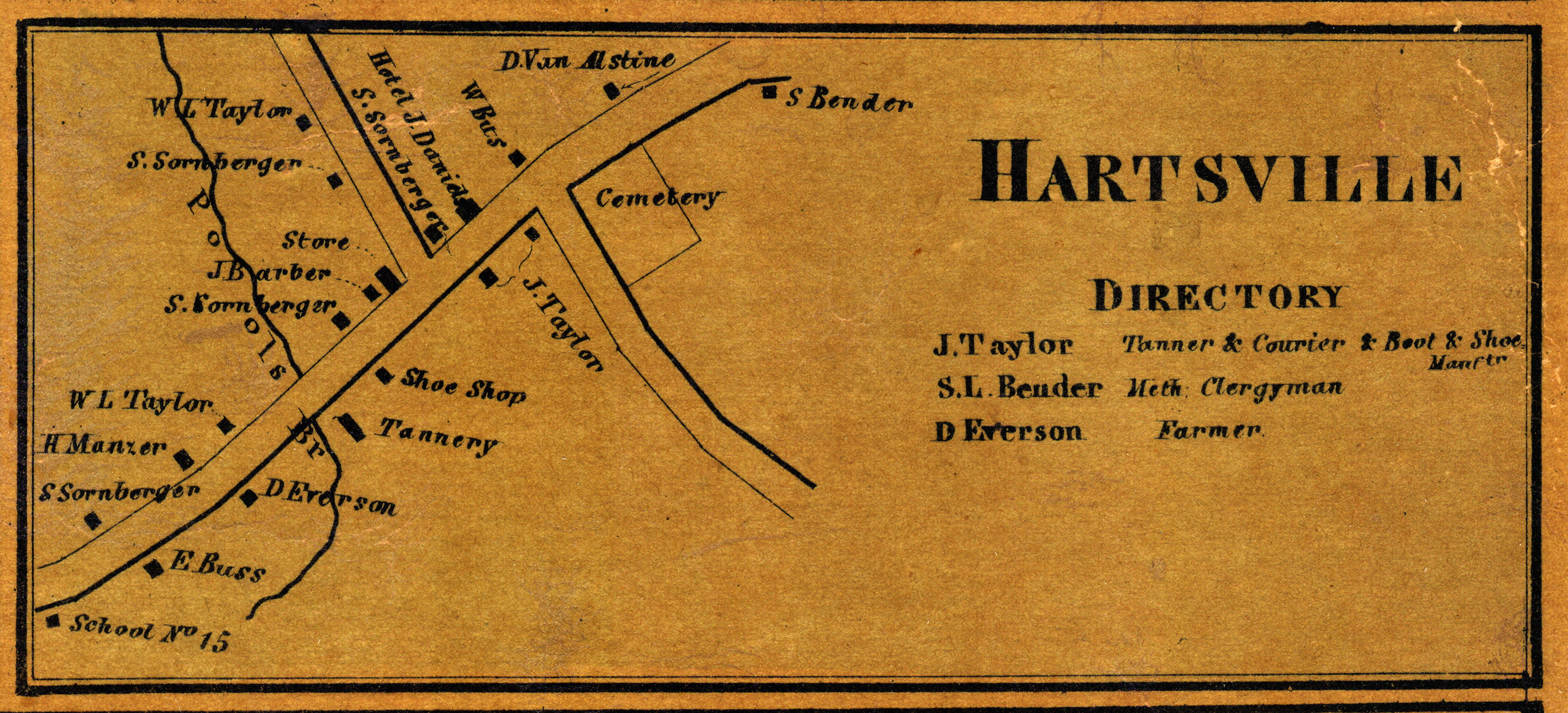
Mycenae as Hartsville, 1860

Historically the hamlet was sometimes known as Hartsville; it is however not to be confused with the Hartsville in Steuben County.

== Community ==
The area is the site of some small farms, as well as the Aspinall Tree Nursery. Some local homes are large, while others are more modest. The Greek Revival style Mycenae Schoolhouse, built 1850, was added to the National Register of Historic Places in 1983.

Local mail is handled at ZIP code 13066 in the nearby Village of Fayetteville.

New York State Route 5 passes through the hamlet.
