= Western Knife Company =

American manufacturer of hunting knives

Logo of the Western Knife Company

The Western Knife Company was an American manufacturer of hunting knives which began operations in Boulder, Colorado in 1911. The company is probably best known for its "Bowie" style hunting knives. The company was purchased by Coleman (the famous manufacturer of outdoor equipment) in 1984. Camillus Cutlery Company purchased Western in 1992. In February, 2007, Camillus closed as a result of bankruptcy due to competition from companies making cheaper knives in other countries. (Acme United Corporation sold the Camillus brand to GSM Outdoors in 2023. The Western brand and the Camillus brand now both are manufactured in Asia.)

== Western Cutlery Company ==
The Western Cutlery Company story and that of several other manufacturers could begin in 1864, the year that Charles W. Platts emigrated from Sheffield, England. Platts was descended from a long line of knife makers and, in turn, his descendants were to have a significant impact upon a number of U.S. cutlery businesses.

Platts' first employment in this country was the American Knife Company in Reynolds Bridge, Connecticut. A few years later, he became superintendent of the factory belonging to the Northfield Knife Company in the nearby town from which the company took its name. Charles and his wife, Sarah, reared five sons and each learned the cutlery craft at the Northfield Cutlery firm. Although other sons and their descendants remained active in the cutlery industry, the focus here is on Harvey Nixon Platts.

H.N. Platts left Northfield in 1891 and moved west to Little Valley, in Cattaraugus County, New York. His experience led him to work in the blade grinding and finishing department of a new knife factory operated by Cattaraugus Cutlery Company. The company's early owners, J.B.F. Champlin and his son Tint, were joined temporarily in the business by four brothers of Mrs. Champlin (formerly Therese Case). These Champlin brothers-in-law were W.R., Jean, John and Andrew Case.

Also working in the Cattaraugus office was Debbie Case, who lived with her brother, Russ, and their father, W.R. Case. In 1892, H.N. Platts and Debbie Case were married and, within a couple of years, they had become parents of two sons, Harlow and Reginald.

Charles Platts, still a respected cutlery leader, and his other sons reentered the picture when they moved from Northfield to Little Valley in 1893 and began work with Cattaraugus. Practically every department of the Cattaraugus factory now had a Platts family member at work and the result would be nearly inevitable; they decided to start their own cutlery business. In 1896, Charles Platts was joined by his five sons in forming the C. Platts & Sons Cutlery Company in nearby Gowanda, New York, which in 1887 moved to new and larger facilities in Eldred, Pennsylvania. In 1900, when Charles Platts died, it was H.N. who assumed leadership of the family business. In addition to managerial responsibilities, H.N. served as the key salesman of Platts cutlery products. Ever expanding to new territories, his sales trips took him father west through several states and into the midwestern plains states. More than a few of Platts' sales trips were made in the company of another cutlery salesman, brother-in-law Russ Case. Platts would sell knives on one side of the town street while Case sold on the other side, each selling knives branded with their own name.

A new company, with J. Russell Case and H.N. Platts as organizers and major stockholders, was to emerge from this family and working relationship. The early days of the business would see the company selling knives branded both "Platts" and "Case", so choosing one family name was deemed logical. Because Russ Case would have sales responsibility while Platts would oversee manufacturing, the name "Case" was selected. Some time earlier, Russ had begun a jobbing company known as "W.R. Case and Sons". The new company, incorporated in 1904 in Little Valley, would have a similar name except that an "s" would be added to the word "Son", thereby recognizing Platts family membership as the W.R. Case son-in-law. Debbie Case Platts supervised the office and summer school vacations saw the two young Platts boys working in the factory.

H.N. Platts health began to decline due to "grinder's consumption", a disease of the lungs caused from years of work with the sandstone grinding wheels. Although the business was doing very well and the now teenage Platts sons were becoming increasingly active in the business, the father's health hinged upon a move to a drier climate. In 1911, he sold his interest in the company to Russ Case and moved his family to Boulder, Colorado. Accompanying Platts and his family to their new home was a determination to continue his lifetime work in the cutlery industry.

A developing west proved to be fertile ground for knife sales since the cowboys, farmers, miners, and others workers needed quality cutlery to use many times every day. Platts knew the business and he certainly had experience in starting a cutlery factory, but he also recognized the need to establish a base of business if he was to be successful in starting all over again. His connections with the eastern cutlery manufacturers were important as he sought sources of product. Before the year 1911 was over, orders were being sold and knives were arriving from the east to fill them. The new business was named “Western States Cutlery and Manufacturing Company”. That name was selected instead of the founders name because "Platts" had been used a brand for the old company mentioned earlier and had very recently been used by Platts Brothers Cutlery Company, operated by H. N. Platts brothers. The geographical name was given to establish an identity separate from that of the Case and Platts businesses back east, and the “States” extension of the name signified the company's sales territory.

Early Western States knives were manufactured by Challenge, New York Knife Company, Valley Forge, Utica, and W. R. Case & Sons, among others. Although the business was prospering and a manufacturing facility would have been in order, it would be several years coming. World War I had begun and had brought shortages of material and labor. It had also required the services of the older son, Harlow, whose aid would have been needed for factory startup. Platts dream was realized, however, with the opening of his new factory in 1920. In the early 1940s, H. N. retired from active management of Western States Cutlery and those responsibilities were passed on to his sons, Reginald and Harlow, who continued in partnership until Reginald left the cutlery business in 1950. A new name, Western Cutlery Company, was given the business in 1951 when Harlow Platts and his son, Harvey, reincorporated the company. Western Cutlery remained in Boulder until its 1978 relocation to nearby Longmont, Colorado.

Harvey Platts had become company president and continued in that capacity until 1984, when Western was purchased by the Crossman Air gun division of Coleman Corporation, thus ending the more than 100-year involvement of the Platts family in the U.S. cutlery industry. The association with Coleman lasted until 1990, when an investor group in Wyoming purchased the knife factory and trademarks. Unable to obtain satisfactory profit performance, the company's brands, machinery, and tooling were sold to Camillus Cutlery Co. in 1991, and many parts, papers, and other items were dispersed at auction. Camillus Cutlery closed its doors in February 2007, leaving the future of Western Cutlery and the company's other brands in limbo.

== Stampings and trademarks ==
Early Western States knives had tangs stamped with the words WESTERN STATES in an arch and BOULDER, COLORADO in a straight line below, similar to the stamp used by C. Platts and Sons. Pocketknife tangs were stamped with the curved WESTERN STATES until about 1950, when WESTERN, BOULDER, COLORADO was adapted.

WESTACO was a budget price 88 bd brand that seems to have appeared in the 1930s. WESTMARK was a brand used on high end products that first appeared in 1970.

In addition to stamped tangs, many early knives had trademark etching on the blade. The company's best-known mark was a tic-tac-toe pattern, and the words “Sharp Tested Temper”, were used beginning in 1911. In 1928, the Buffalo trademark consisting of an old buffalo skull framed with “Western States” and “Sharp Cutlery” was adopted and gradually replaced the tic-tac-toe marking. The “dagger and diamond” logo that appeared on later Western products was first used in 1963. Tang stamps on pocketknives as well as sheath knives were gradually changed to “Western USA” during the 1960s. Beginning in 1978 and continuing until the mid-1980s, the stamp “Western USA” was used with a letter added beneath the “USA” to indicate the production year.

A-1977
B-1978
C-1979
D-1980
E-1981
F-1982
G-1983
H-1984
I-1985
J-1986

During the 1980s, stampings began to include the model number, a trend that continued under Camilluss ownership. The Coleman era (1984–1990) saw the use of some COLEMAN WESTERN stamps as well as ColemanWestern markings on the retaining strap buttons of knife sheaths. IDENTIFYING WESTERN STATES POCKETKNIVES Western States early knives follow the traditional numbering system of a pattern number, along with letters and other numbers that described the knife's features. Unfortunately, the numbering system was an internal protocol for employees and pattern numbers were not marked on the company's products until 1954. With Camillus now out of business, much of that inside company information has been lost. Collectors today must identify early knives from catalogs and application of the numbering system. Most of the old stock numbers can be deciphered by using the numbering key explained below. Some older pocketknife numbers have a zero inserted just before the pattern number to signify a modification, usually in material or finish, such as (9393 or 93093)

The first digit signifies handle material as follows:

- 2 – imitation pearl
- 3 – brown or golden shell
- 4 – white or imitation ivory
- 5 – genuine stag
- 6 – bone stag
- 7 – ivory or agate
- 8 – genuine pearl
