= Camillus Cutlery Company =

American knife manufacturer

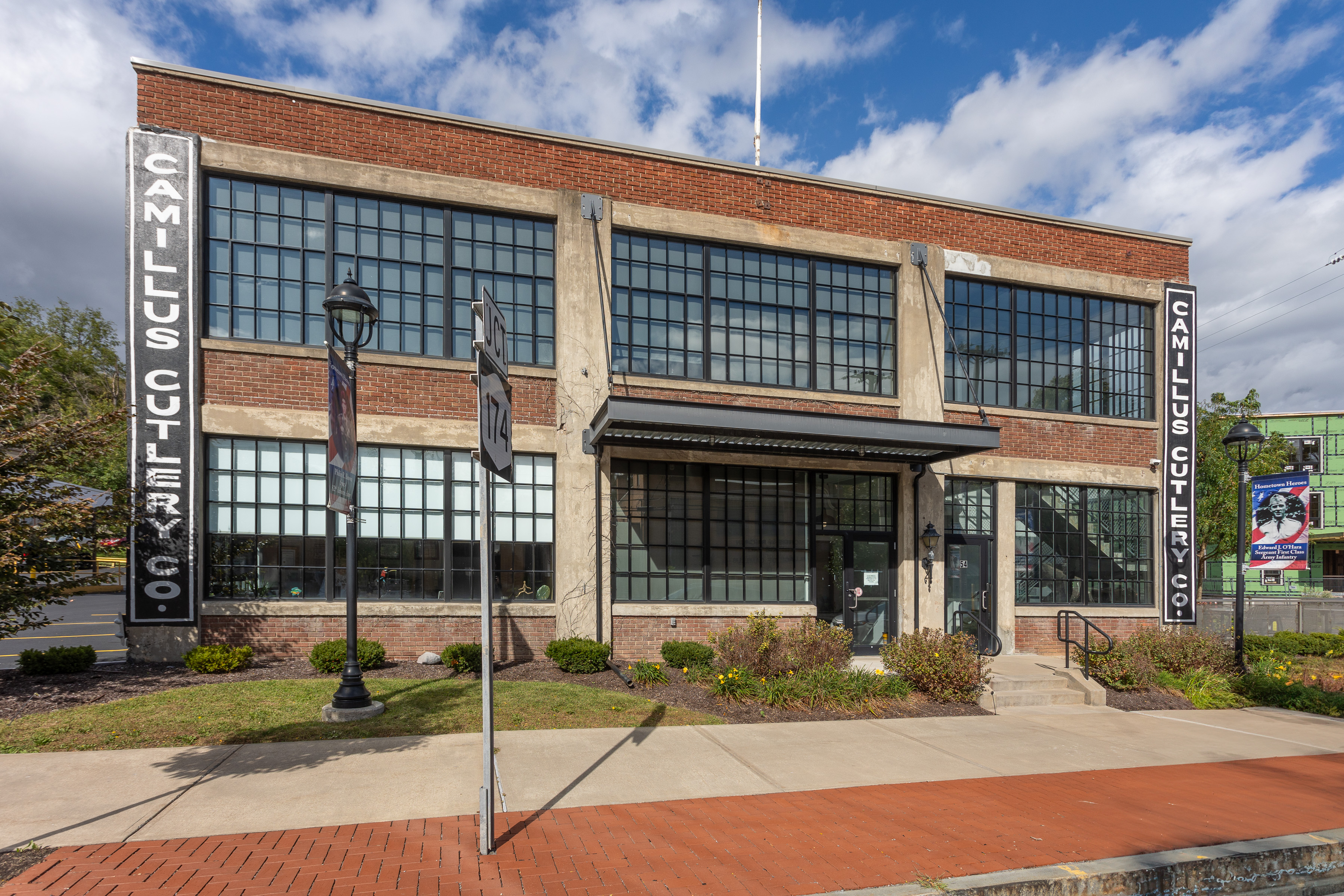
- Former headquarters in Camillus, New York
- Industry: Knife Manufacturer
- Founded: 1876; 150 years ago
- Headquarters: Camillus, United States
- Owner: GSM Holdings, Inc.
- Website: Camillus Home

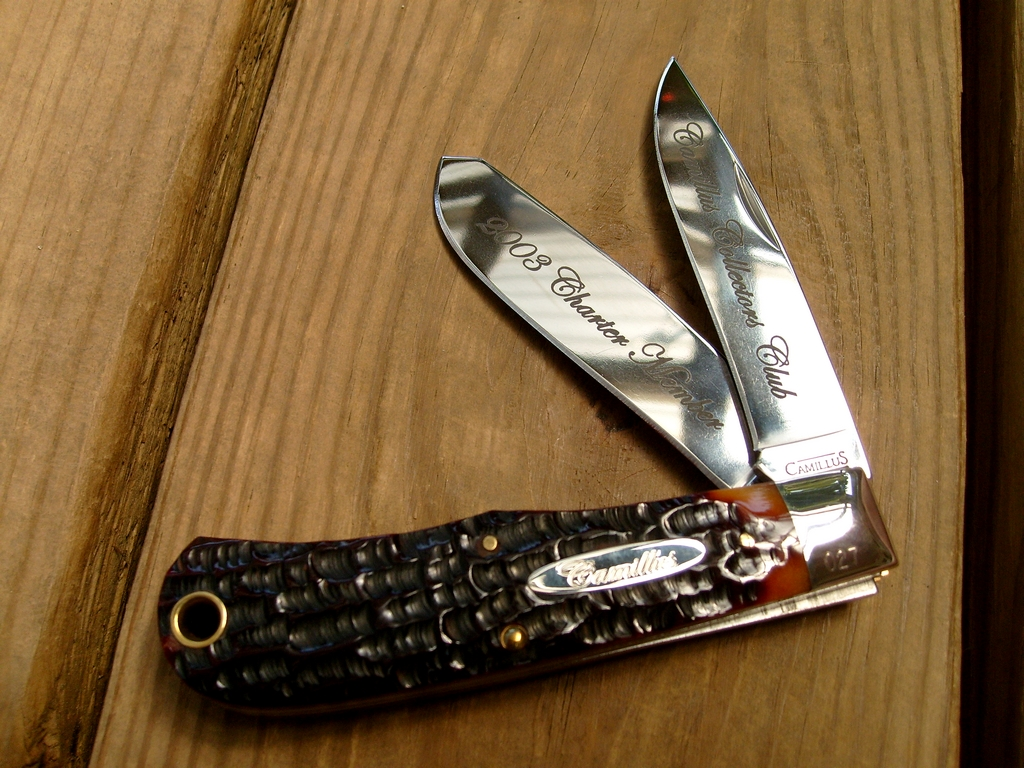
Camillus Collectors Club 2003 Charter Member Trapper

The Camillus Cutlery Company is one of the oldest knife manufacturers in the United States. The company was founded in 1876 and produced millions of knives until it filed for bankruptcy in 2007. Its brand name and intellectual property rights were purchased by Acme United Corporation, which re-launched the Camillus brand in May 2009 using modern materials.

== History ==
=== Adolph Kastor ===
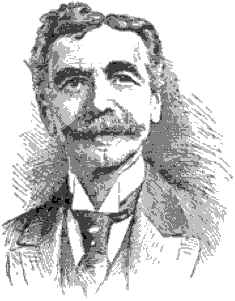
Adolph Kastor

The 14-year-old Adolph Kastor (1856–1946), is a son of a Jewish family from Wattenheim, Germany, immigrated to New York in 1870 where he started to work for his uncle Aaron Kastor in his hardware supply business, Bodenheim, Meyer & Company. He started off in charge of cow chains but gradually promoted to the firearms and cutlery department.

In 1873, Bodenheim, Meyer & Company lost one of its founders and restructured as Meyer & Kastor. Due to poor sales figures, Meyer & Kastor had to close its doors in September 1876. Only a few weeks later, Adolph Kastor started his own company, Adolph Kastor & Bros. on Canal Street in New York City, where he imported and distributed German-made knives.

In 1897, when the Dingley Tariff was enacted, the knives became too expensive to import. The only solution Kastor saw was to manufacture knives domestically. Eventually, his search led him to Charles Sherwood and his small knife manufacturing business in Camillus.

=== 1902–1913 ===
With Adolph Kastor in charge, the company started to expand. They bought new machinery, such as steam-driven drop forge hammers and fly presses and they adopted new techniques, like using alumina grinding wheels. By 1910, the Camillus Cutlery Company was producing close to a million knives a year and had about 200 employees, many of them German immigrants. The company even built a dormitory to house its German workers.

=== 1914–1945 ===
During World War I, Camillus shifted production to support the Allied forces. The company also manufactured marlinspikes, surgical scalpels, and a folding knife/spoon combination for the Red Cross in those years.

In the 1920s, the knife manufacturer introduced stainless steel to its production, and started making collectible character knives, which honoured famous people such as George Washington, Babe Ruth, and Buck Rogers. It also began manufacturing private label products for Sears, Craftsman, Woolworth and many others.

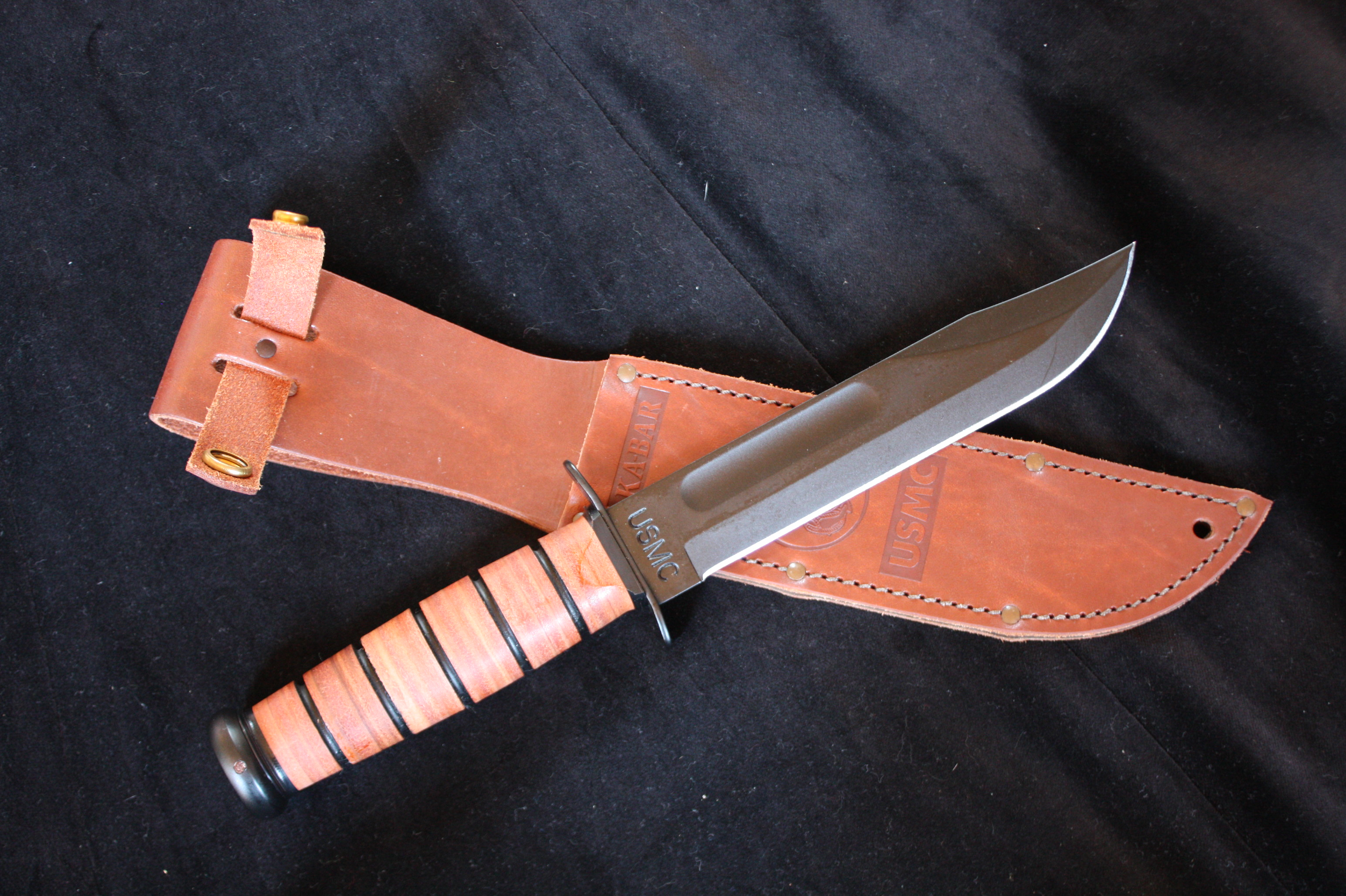
USMC KA-BAR Fighting Utility Knife

During World War II, Camillus shipped more than 13 million knives of various styles to the Allied troops. In 1942, U.S. Marine Corps officers Colonel John M. Davis and Major Howard E. America working in conjunction with cutlery technicians at Camillus developed the KA-BAR Fighting Utility Knife. After extensive trials, the KA-BAR prototype was recommended for adoption, and Camillus was awarded the first contract to produce the KA-BAR for the Marine Corps. Camillus made more KA-BARs than any other knife manufacturer producing the model during World War II. During the war, Camillus also made the M3 fighting knives, the M4 bayonets and many other utility knives for U.S. forces, including machetes, multi-blade utility knives, TL-29 Signal Corps pocket knives for signalmen, electrician's mates, and linesmen, and combination knife/marlinspike pocket knives for use by the U.S. Navy in cutting and splicing lines.

=== 1946–1959 ===
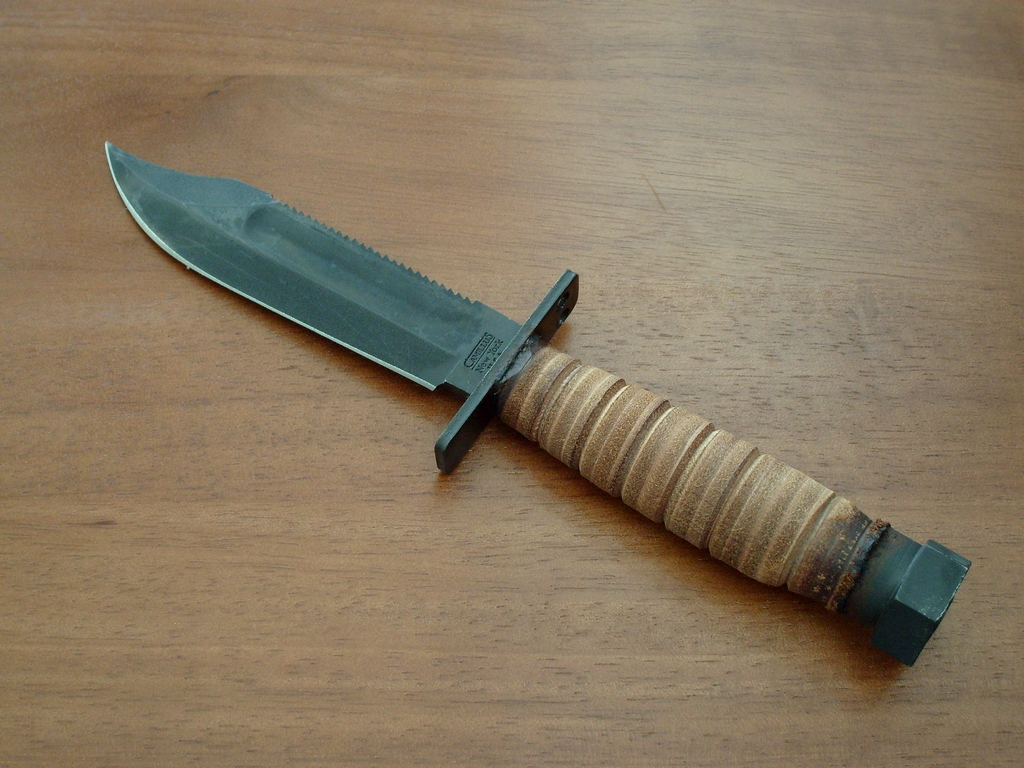
Camillus pilot Survival Knife

After World War II, Camillus was quick to shift back to civilian production. It introduced many new products, and in 1947, Camillus began manufacturing a full line of official folding knives for the Boy Scouts of America (BSA).

During the Vietnam War, Camillus again manufactured a large number of knives for the armed forces, for instance a pilot survival knife, a USMC KA-BAR combat knife and a four bladed utility knife. After the Vietnam War (1975), the company continued its growth by adding more new pieces to their already wide product range.

== 1960-2005 ==
In the 1960s, Camillus was sold to the Baer family of New York City.

Camillus began using Delrin a synthetic bone from circa late 1960's through at least the 80's.

Camillus produced the Hand Made #89 Rancher Indian Delrin Stag Stockman 3 Triple Blade Pocket Knife with Sword Brand Blades in the 1970s. Highly collectible today.

In 1991, Camillus acquired Western Cutlery Company. This Boulder, Colorado company had been making knives since 1896.

In 2001, Camillus collaborated with custom Knifemaker Jerry Fisk, the only knifemaker to be declared a Living National Treasure, to produce a Bowie knife. That same year, Camillus began a partnership with custom knifemaker Darryl Ralph to produce a line of titanium framed tactical folding knives.

== Bankruptcy ==
The Camillus Cutlery factory in the village of Camillus, New York c.2006.

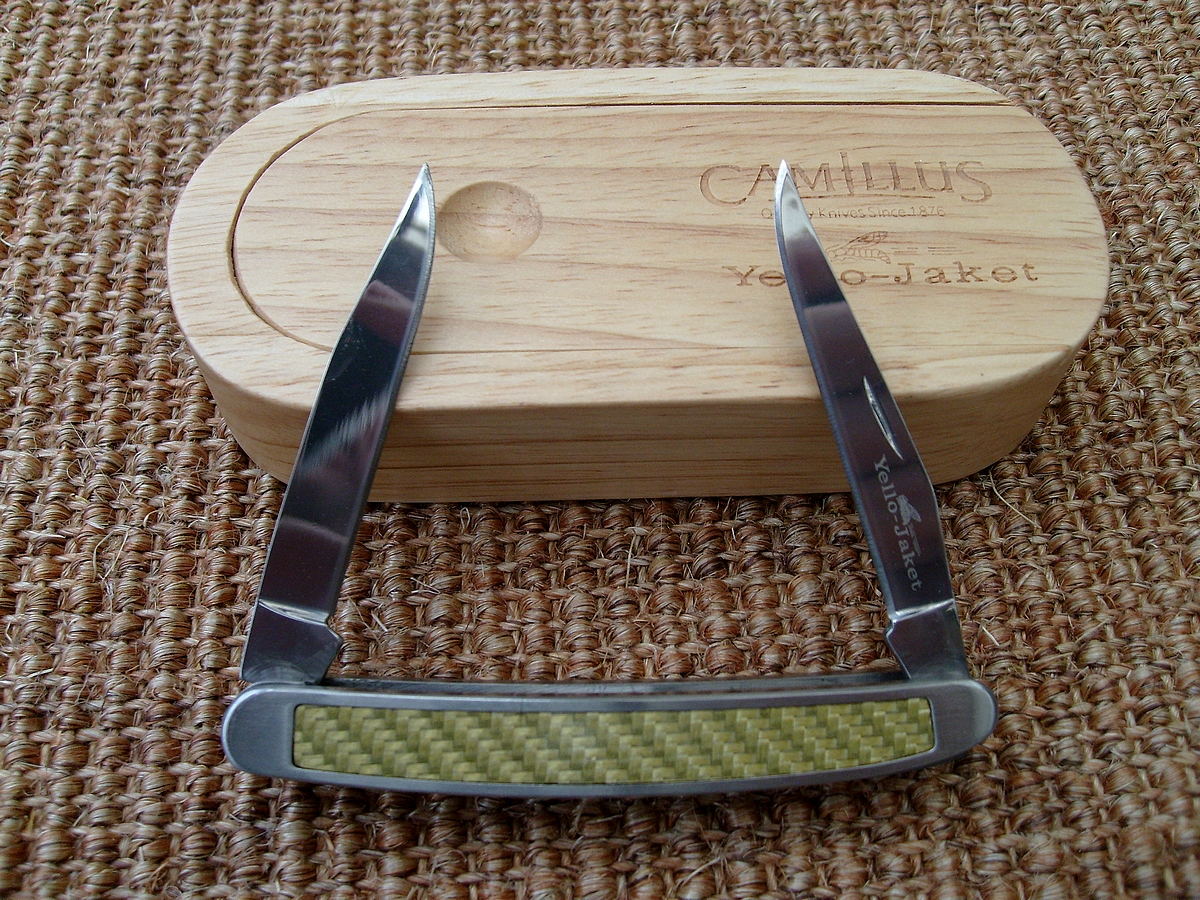
Camillus Yello-Jaket Muskrat

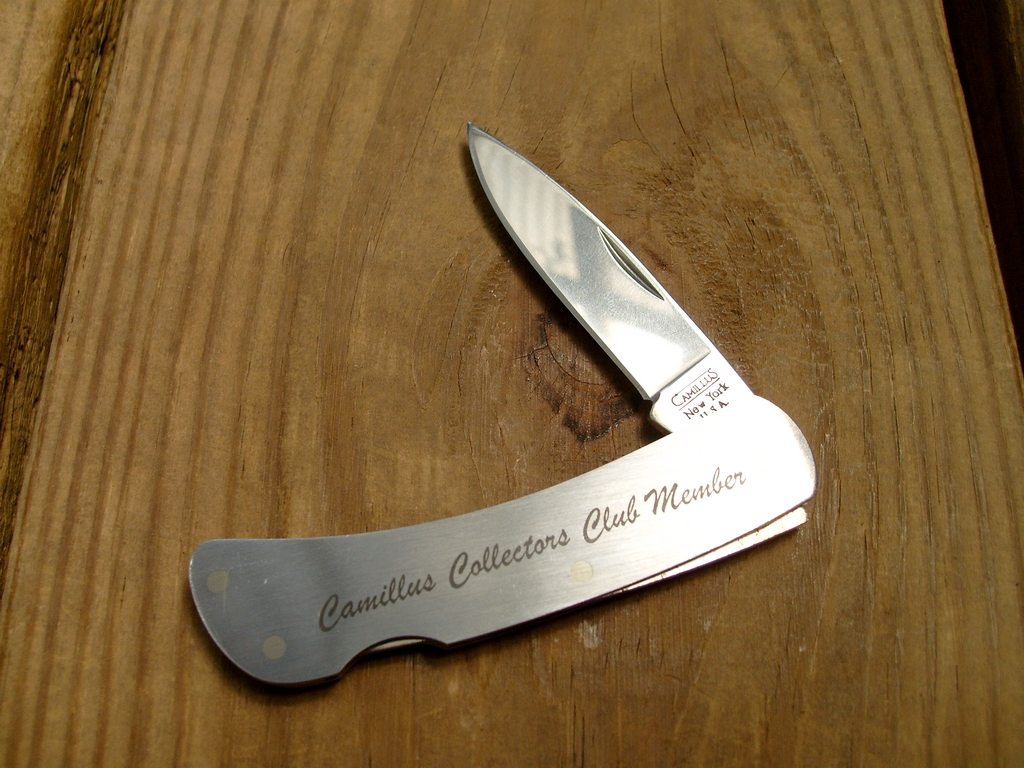
Camillus Collectors Club Member lockback

Since the turn of the century, Camillus Cutlery saw its revenue decline due to stiff overseas competition and allegedly poor management practices. As a result, employees implemented a four-day workweek after the normal factory shutdown at Christmas 2005. A few months later, Camillus’ management proposed large wage and benefit cuts. Workers didn't agree and the company was subject to a months long strike. In response, management locked the workers out for several months. In November 2006, the striking employees ultimately accepted the original contract offer but the company only retained 15 of the 78 union members and laid off the rest.

The lock out ultimately took its toll on Camillus as customers dried up and the company subsequently filed for bankruptcy and closed on February 28, 2007. On September 18, 2007, the product brand names and intellectual property of the company were acquired by Acme United Corporation in a bankruptcy auction for $200,000.

After the bankruptcy, the original Camillus factory remained empty until it was partly destroyed by fire on February 11, 2013. The former Camillus Cutlery headquarters have since been turned into apartments and retail space.

== Camillus as Acme United brand ==
In May 2009, Acme United re-launched Camillus at the 2009 National Hardware Show in Las Vegas. The traditional Camillus knives were almost entirely replaced by new modern knives with durable handles and titanium carbonitride bonded blades.

In December 2011, Acme United signed an agreement with Les Stroud to build and sell Camillus survival knives and tools, co-designed and promoted by the outdoor adventurer, known from the TV series Survivorman. Next to Les Stroud, Camillus joined forces with several other so-called Pro Staffers. The Pro Staff team consists of former Green Berets, expert hunters, Special Forces, adventurers, firemen and survival experts. Amongst them is Grady Powell, a former U.S. Army Green Beret who is now the host of Discovery Channel’s Dual Survival. Also part of the Pro Staff is Jared Ogden, a former Navy SEAL who was the star of the National Geographic Television program Ultimate Survival Alaska.

In 2013, Camillus re-launched its knives in Europe. Today, Camillus is being distributed in twelve European countries, as well as in Australia, South Africa and the Philippines.

Since the relaunch, the brand annually introduces new knives. In 2017, for example, Camillus brought a new collection of hunting knives to the market, as well as a new tactical knife family, which was created in collaboration with Camillus Pro Staff members, Jared Ogden and Grady Powell.

In November 2023, Acme United sold the Camillus brand and product line to GSM Holdings Inc, which, under its GSM Outdoors umbrella, comprises over 40 hunting, shooting sports, rugged outdoors and fishing labels.
