= Titanium carbonitride =

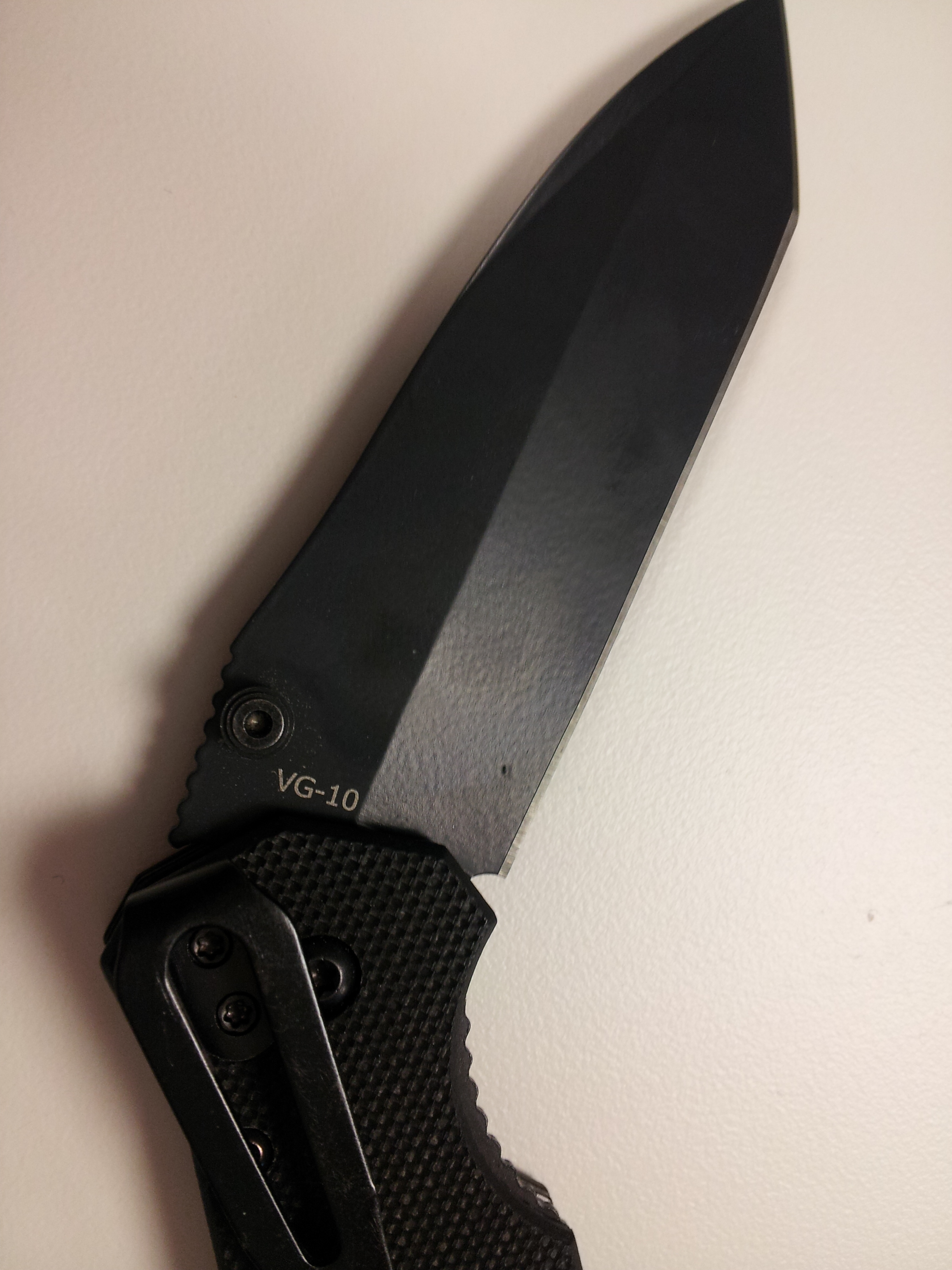
Titanium carbonitride–coated VG-10 blade

Titanium carbonitride (TiCN) is a solid solution of titanium nitride (TiN) and titanium carbide (TiC). Titanium carbonitride is harder than titanium nitride and softer than titanium carbide and can be used without lubrication. The wide homogeneity range of titanium carbonitride allows the properties of the material to be adjusted by changing the ratio of carbon to nitrogen atoms in the material. Titanium carbonitride is applied to machine tool cutters by vapor deposition methods such as chemical vapor deposition (CVD).

Titanium carbonitride coatings have high hardness, wear resistance as well as chemical resistance. Titanium carbonitride is a cermet—a composite of metal and ceramic. The ceramic provides high hardness, and the metal provides toughness.

Titanium carbonitride can be prepared by reacting titanium dioxide and carbon in a furnace containing an inert gas, then reducing in nitrogen gas.

== See also ==
- Camillus Cutlery Company, as used in coating knives
