= Union Free School =

Union Free School may refer to the following schools in New York:

- Camillus Union Free School, Camillus, listed on the NRHP in Onondaga County
- East Rochester Union Free School District, East Rochester, in Monroe County
- Eastchester Union Free School District, Eastchester, in Westchester County
- Garrison Union Free School, Garrison, listed on the NRHP in Putnam County
- Hammondsport Union Free School, Hammondsport, listed on the NRHP in Steuben County
- Herricks Union Free School District, New Hyde Park
- Huntington Union Free School District, Huntington, NY, in Suffolk County
- Katonah-Lewisboro Union Free School District, Katonah, NY, in Westchester County
- Le Roy House and Union Free School, Le Roy, listed on the NRHP in Genesee County
- Lebanon Springs Union Free School, New Lebanon, listed on the NRHP in Columbia County
- Lindenhurst Union Free School District, Lindenhurst, NY, in Suffolk County
- New York Mills Union Free School, New York Mills, listed on the NRHP in Oneida County
- Rocky Point Union Free School District, Rocky Point, NY, in Suffolk County
- Rye Neck Union Free School District, Rye, listed on the NRHP in Westchester County
- Scarsdale Union Free School District, Scarsdale, listed on the NRHP in Westchester County
- Spackenkill Union Free School District, Poughkeepsie, NY, in Dutchess County
- Union Free School (Downsville, New York), listed on the NRHP in Delaware County
- Union Free School (New Hamburg, New York), listed on the NRHP in Dutchess County
