= Mycenae Schoolhouse =

- U.S. National Register of Historic Places
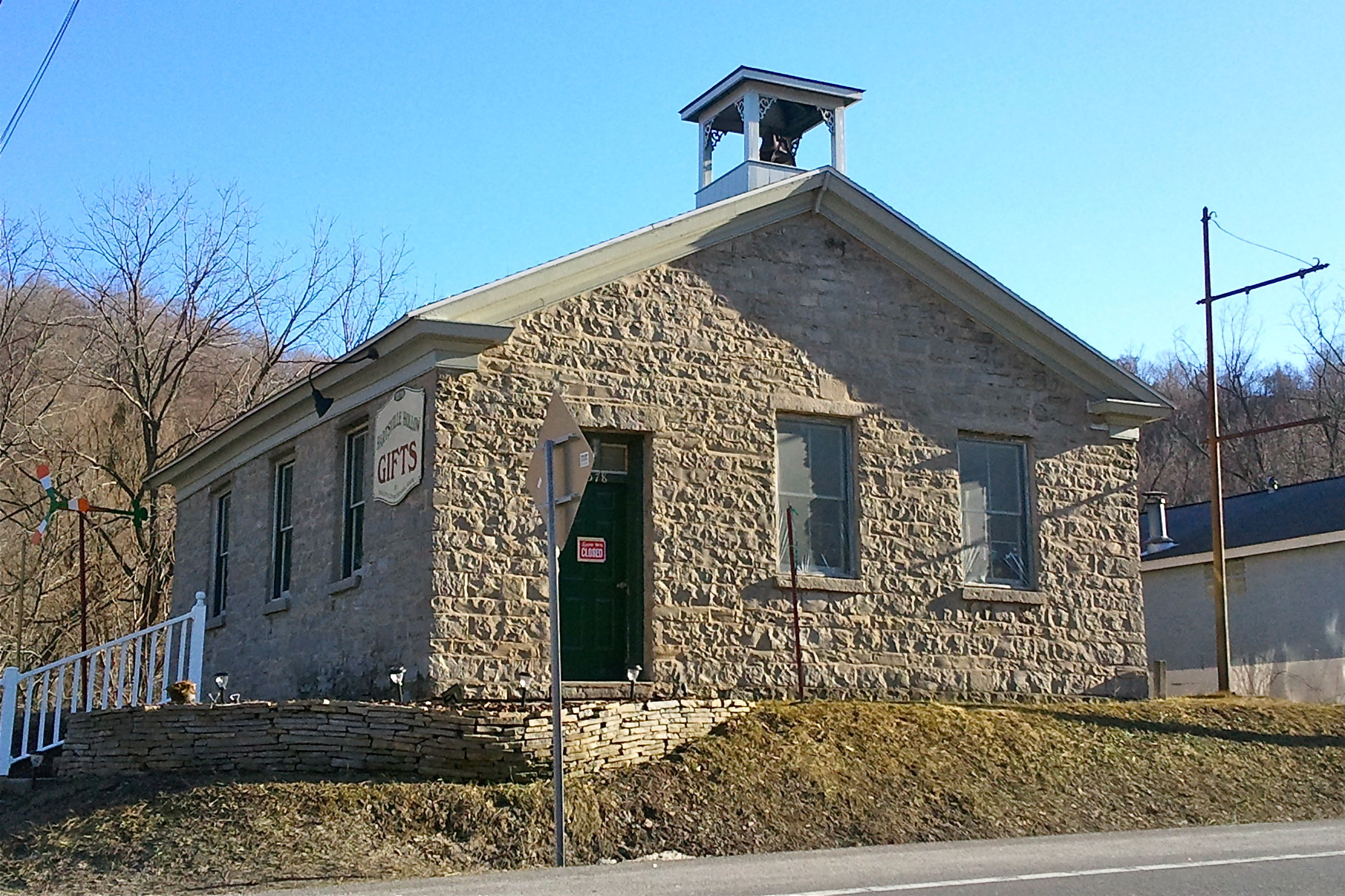

- Location within New York Location within the United States
- Location: NY 5, Manlius, New York
- Coordinates: 43°2′48″N 75°56′1″W
- Area: less than one acre
- Built: 1850
- Architectural style: Greek Revival
- NRHP reference No.: 83001754
- Added to NRHP: August 11, 1983

Mycenae Schoolhouse is a historic one-room school building located in the hamlet of Mycenae in the town of Manlius in Onondaga County, New York. It is a one-story building built of locally quarried limestone with a low-pitched gabled roof in the Greek Revival style. The roof features a small belfry. It was built in 1850 and ceased being used as a school in 1936.

It is prominently located on NY 5.

It was listed on the National Register of Historic Places in 1983. In recent years it has been used as an antiques shop. As of late 2009, the building is vacant and available for sale or for rent.
