= Plainville, New York =

Plainville
- hamlet
- Location within the state of New York
- Coordinates: 43°9′47″N 76°26′50″W
- Country: United States
- State: New York
- County: Onondaga
- Time zone: UTC-5 (Eastern (EST))
  - Summer (DST): UTC-4 (EST)
- ZIP code: 13137

Plainville is a hamlet on NY Route 370, approximately 4.5 miles west of Baldwinsville in Onondaga County, New York, United States.

It is noted for the extensive Plainville Turkey Farms, which remained in the same family from 1835 until the business was sold in 2007 to Hain Celestial Group. The former Plainville turkey processing operations were relocated to Pennsylvania in 2009, and the Plainville plant was shut down in 2010.

On Route 370, west of the hamlet, is the James Leslie Voorhees house, Whig Hill (1833), one of the major historic houses of Onondaga County. Voorhees was a wealthy landowner of nearby property and a builder of New York City as well as Central New York engineering projects who was active in New York State politics.

Whig Hill and Dependencies was listed on the National Register of Historic Places in 1990.
