= Delphi Village School =

- U.S. National Register of Historic Places
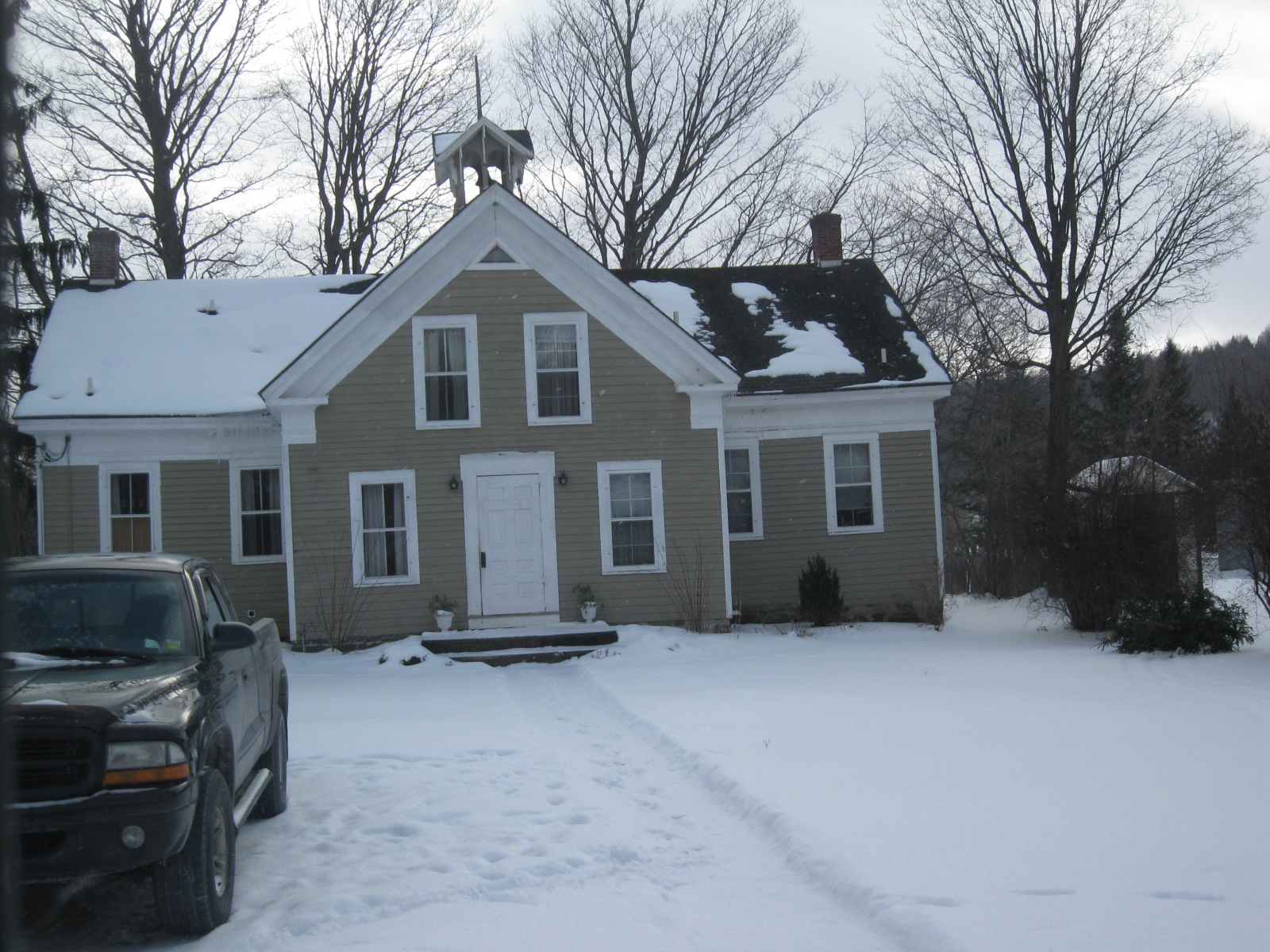
- Delphi Village School, February 2010

- Location within New York Location within the United States
- Location: East Rd., Delphi Falls, New York
- Coordinates: 42°52′35″N 75°54′53″W
- Area: 1 acre (0.40 ha)
- Built: 1857
- Architectural style: Greek Revival
- NRHP reference No.: 86001152
- Added to NRHP: May 22, 1986

The Delphi Village School, also known as the Delphi Falls Schoolhouse, is a former one-room schoolhouse located at Delphi Falls, New York in Onondaga County, New York. It was built between 1854 and 1860 and is a 1 1/2-story, frame, "T" plan, vernacular Greek Revival–style structure with a rear woodshed addition. The entrance vestibule is topped by a distinctive Italianate-style belfry. The school closed in 1960 and was subsequently converted to residential use.

It was listed on the National Register of Historic Places in 1986.

== Gallery ==
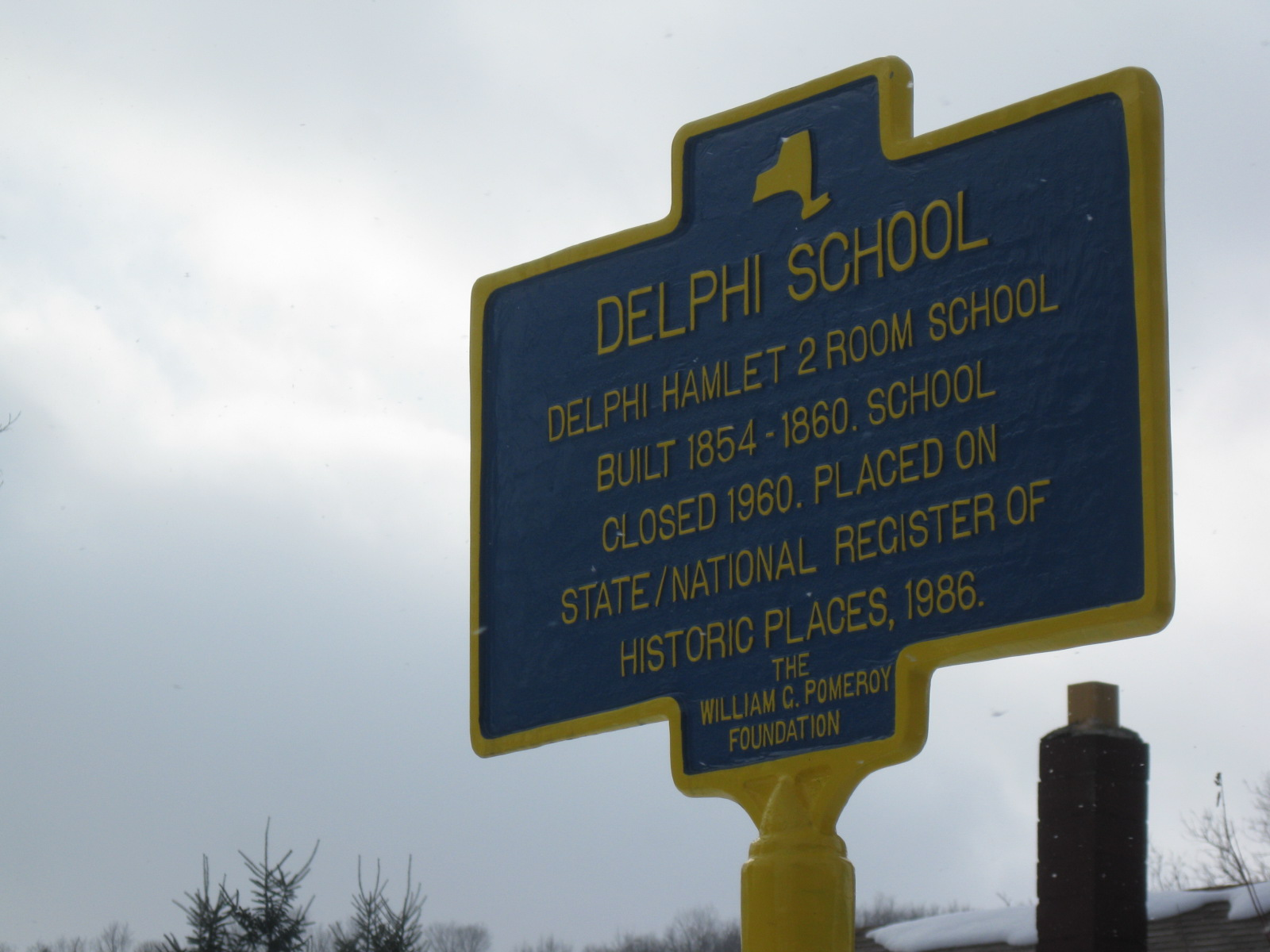
Delphi Village School Historical Marker, February 2010
