= Borodino Hall =

- Borodino Community Center
- U.S. National Register of Historic Places
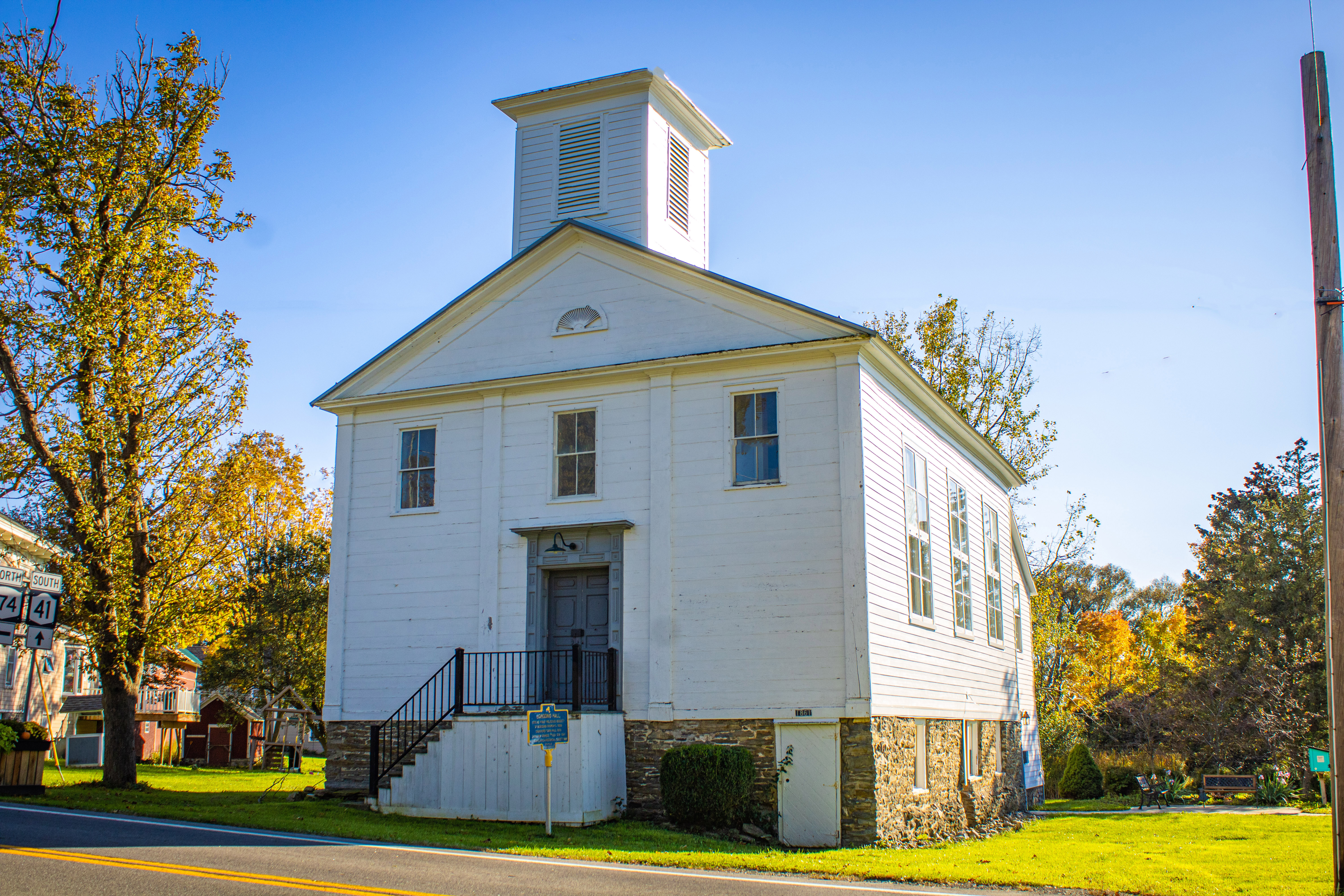
- Borodino Hall, October 2021

- Location within New York Location within the United States
- Nearest city: Borodino, New York
- Coordinates: 42°51′31″N 76°20′20″W
- Area: less than one acre
- Built: 1835
- Architectural style: Federal
- NRHP reference No.: 06000647
- Added to NRHP: July 28, 2006

Borodino Community Center(BCC), also previously known as the Borodino Hall or Grange Hall, is a building in the hamlet of Borodino, New York. It was listed on the National Register of Historic Places in 2006. Borodino Community Center was built in 1835 by the First Religious Society of Borodino, and served as a church until 1868.

It is a two-story building with a gabled roof on a high stone basement. It is of heavy timber-frame construction designed in the Federal style. The building was sold in 1868, and a stage was added to the interior around that time, converting it into a hall. In 1871, a performance of "Uncle Tom’s Cabin" was presented there by the Borodino Dramatic Society.

At some time after this, the building became the Spafford Town Hall, a purpose it served until 1912. In that year the Grange chapter #1272 began meeting in the Hall, and they purchased it in 1919. Water service, a kitchen and restrooms were added in the early 1950s.

The Spafford Area Historical Society (SAHS) purchased the building in 1997. SAHS has been renovating the Borodino Community Center since 2013. SAHS has performed structural work, repaired the foundation and installed a new concrete floor in the lower level. They also upgraded the bathrooms, installed a new metal roof, windows, insulation, siding and a water purification system. In the fall of 2024, new interior lighting was installed along with an oak plank floor in the upper level and a kitchenette in the lower level.

It currently serves as a community center and is available to the community to rent for baby/wedding showers, small weddings or family reunions or other events.

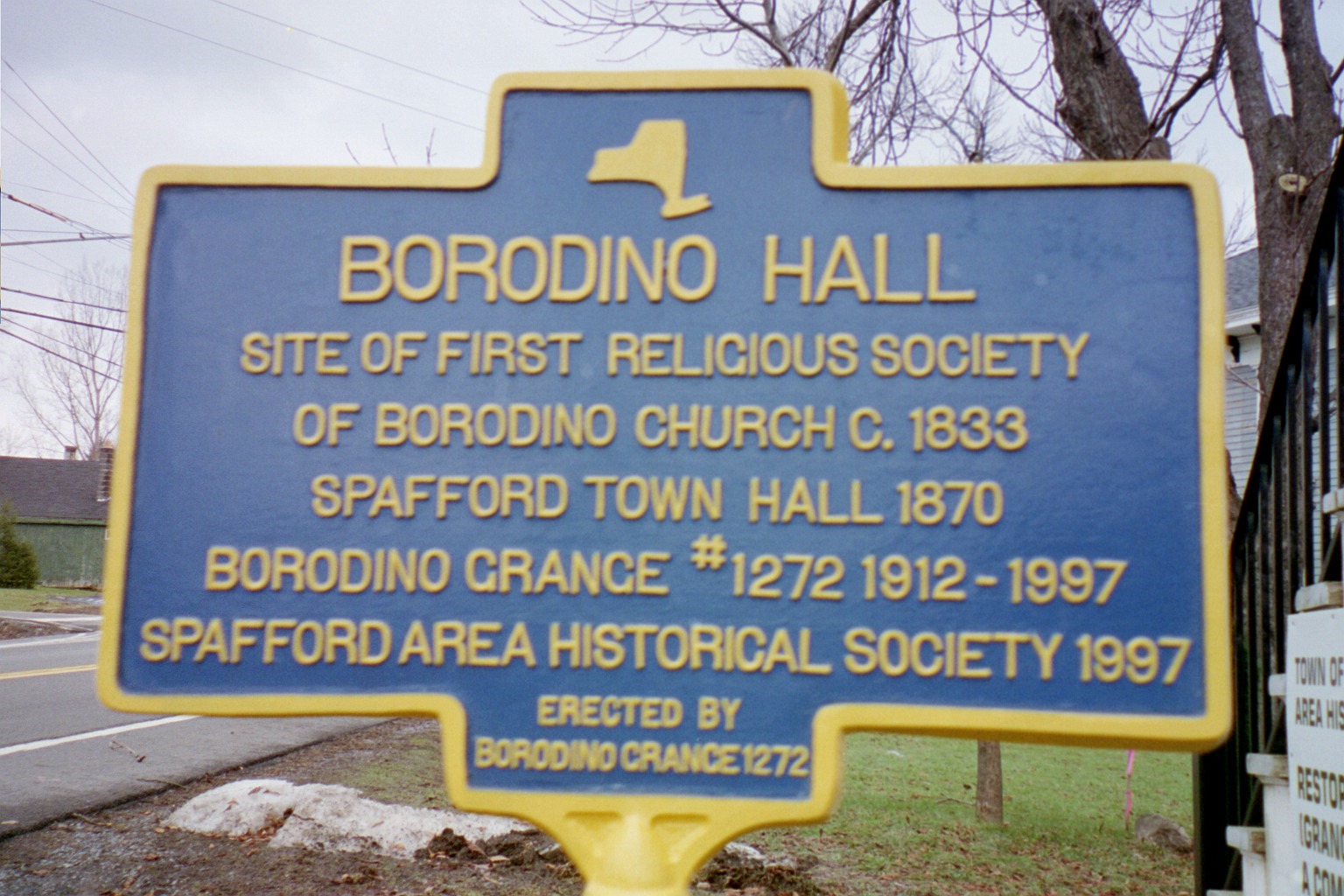
Historic Marker at Borodino Hall
