= Borodino, New York =

- hamlet
- Location within New York
- Coordinates: 42°51′32″N 76°20′17″W
- Country: United States
- State: New York
- County: Onondaga
- Elevation: 1,102 ft (336 m)
- Time zone: UTC-5 (Eastern (EST))
  - Summer (DST): UTC-4 (EDT)
- Postal code: 13152
- Area code: 315
- GNIS feature ID: 944463

Borodino is a hamlet located at the intersection of New York State Route 41 (East Lake Road, running approximately east–west) and New York State Route 174 (Rose Hill Road, running north–south) in the Town of Spafford in Onondaga County, New York, United States, near Skaneateles Lake. The hamlet proper extends five to ten properties to the east, south, west and north from the intersection, until houses and a few other buildings are replaced by farm fields. A monument for veterans, designed by Gianfranco Fritelli, stands in a cemetery at the southeast corner of the intersection. A little-altered Federal style Methodist Church, known locally as "The Church", dating from 1830, stands close to the 174, about five properties north. The Borodino District School No. 8 (c. 1853–59) and Borodino Hall (1835) are listed on the National Register of Historic Places.

About four properties to the south is a turnoff to a public boat landing and ramp into Skaneateles Lake; a few more properties to the south is Borodino's fire station, site of several fundraising pancake breakfasts each year which are among the biggest community events in the hamlet. Another is the Town of Spafford's annual Fourth of July parade, running from the fire station to the cemetery at the intersection.

The public boat landing and the Spafford Town Hall are often said to be in Borodino, although the boat landing is about 0.75 miles (1.21 km) to the southwest and the town hall is 0.5 miles (0.80 km) to the north along the 174, and separated by farm fields, from the intersection. The town hall is closer to the intersection of Rose Hill Road with Howe Road.
