= Elbridge Hydraulic Industry Archeological District =

Historic district in New York, United States

- U.S. National Register of Historic Places
- U.S. Historic district
- Nearest city: Elbridge, New York
- Area: 16.7 acres (6.8 ha)
- Built: 1850
- NRHP reference No.: 82003391
- Added to NRHP: June 15, 1982

The Elbridge Hydraulic Industry Archeological District is a historic district in Elbridge, New York.

It includes a 16.7-acre area, with 4 contributing sites and 11 contributing structures.

The district was listed on both the New York State historic register and the National Register of Historic Places in 1982.
