= Camillus (village), New York =

Village in New York, United States

Camillus, New York
- Village
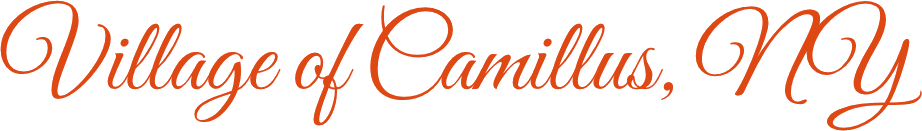
- Logo

- Location in Onondaga County and the state of New York.
- Coordinates: 43°2′22″N 76°18′29″W
- Country: United States
- State: New York
- County: Onondaga

Government
  - Mayor: Richard Waterman

Area
  - Total: 0.41 sq mi (1.05 km^{2})
  - Land: 0.41 sq mi (1.05 km^{2})
  - Water: 0 sq mi (0.00 km^{2})

Population (2020)
  - Total: 1,222
  - Density: 3,012.1/sq mi (1,162.97/km^{2})
- Time zone: UTC-5 (Eastern (EST))
  - Summer (DST): UTC-4 (EDT)
- FIPS code: 36-11902
- Website: villageofcamillusny.com

Camillus is a village in Onondaga County, New York, United States. As of the 2020 census, the population was 1,222. The village takes its name from the town in which it is located. It is part of the Syracuse metropolitan area.

The village of Camillus is in the town of Camillus, west of Syracuse. It was the home of the world-famous Camillus Cutlery Company.

== History ==
Camillus village was part of the former Central New York Military Tract. The village was one of the first locations settled, around 1790.

A protest against the Fugitive Slave Law was formulated in the village in 1852.

The First Baptist Church of Camillus and Camillus Union Free School are listed on the National Register of Historic Places.

On February 11, 2013, the Camillus Cutlery Company caught on fire and was burned down. The cause of the fire was the result of a spark from a cutting torch, during metal removal; no one was injured or killed as a result of the fire.

== Geography ==
Camillus is located at 43°2′21″N 76°18′28″W (43.039364, -76.307996).

According to the United States Census Bureau, the village has a total area of 0.4 square mile (1.0 km^{2}), all land.

Camillus is southwest of Onondaga Lake and is east of New York State Route 5 and New York State Route 174.

Nine Mile Creek, passing by the village, was a source of water for the Erie Canal.

== Demographics ==
Historical population
Census	Pop.	Note	%±
1840	500		—
1860	552		—
1870	598		8.3%
1880	477		−20.2%
1890	487		2.1%
1900	567		16.4%
1910	763		34.6%
1920	808		5.9%
1930	1,036		28.2%
1940	1,133		9.4%
1950	1,225		8.1%
1960	1,416		15.6%
1970	1,534		8.3%
1980	1,298		−15.4%
1990	1,150		−11.4%
2000	1,249		8.6%
2010	1,213		−2.9%
2020	1,222		0.7%
U.S. Decennial Census

As of the census of 2000, there were 1,249 people, 568 households, and 305 families residing in the village. The population density was 3,188.9 inhabitants per square mile (1,231.2/km^{2}). There were 627 housing units at an average density of 1,600.8 per square mile (618.1/km^{2}). The racial makeup of the village was 97.12% White, 0.48% Black or African American, 0.88% Native American, 0.24% Asian, 0.08% from other races, and 1.20% from two or more races. Hispanic or Latino of any race were 0.96% of the population.

There were 568 households, out of which 27.5% had children under the age of 18 living with them, 37.3% were married couples living together, 13.4% had a female householder with no husband present, and 46.3% were non-families. 38.4% of all households were made up of individuals, and 13.4% had someone living alone who was 65 years of age or older. The average household size was 2.18 and the average family size was 2.93.

In the village, the population was spread out, with 24.3% under the age of 18, 8.3% from 18 to 24, 31.3% from 25 to 44, 22.8% from 45 to 64, and 13.3% who were 65 years of age or older. The median age was 36 years. For every 100 females, there were 94.2 males. For every 100 females age 18 and over, there were 89.2 males.

The median income for a household in the village was $36,681, and the median income for a family was $48,125. Males had a median income of $32,424 versus $26,198 for females. The per capita income for the village was $19,939. About 6.9% of families and 8.0% of the population were below the poverty line, including 14.5% of those under age 18 and 1.2% of those age 65 or over.

== Education ==
The village is in the West Genesee Central School District.
