= National Hardware Show =

Annual trade show held in Las Vegas, Nevada

The National Hardware Show (NHS) is held every year by RX (formerly Reed Exhibitions) in Las Vegas. It is a housing after-market show that brings together manufacturers and resellers of all products used to remodel, repair, maintain and decorate the home and garden.

== Locations ==
May 6–8, 2008; Las Vegas Convention Center

May 5–7, 2009; Las Vegas Convention Center

May 4–6, 2010; Las Vegas Convention Center

May 10–12, 2011; Las Vegas Convention Center

May 1-3, 2012; Las Vegas Convention Center

May 7-9, 2013; Las Vegas Convention Center

May 6-8, 2014; Las Vegas Convention Center

May 8-10, 2018; Las Vegas Convention Center

May 7-9, 2019; Las Vegas Convention Center

October 21-23, 2021; Las Vegas Convention Center

April 5-7, 2022; Las Vegas Convention Center

January 31-February 2, 2023; Las Vegas Convention Center

== History ==
The first National Hardware Show took place in New York City in 1945 and was created by Abe Rosenburg of General Tools, along with Charlie Snitow, General's Chief Legal Council.

In the early 1960s, Reed Exhibitions (previously Cahners Expositions Group) acquired Snitow's trade show business. The Show moved to Chicago's new McCormick Lakeside exhibit hall in 1975. In February 2003, Reed Exhibitions announced that the National Hardware Show was moving to Las Vegas.
