= Shepard Settlement, New York =

Shepard Settlement
- hamlet
- Location within the state of New York
- Coordinates: 42°59′43″N 76°23′00″W
- Country: United States
- State: New York
- County: Onondaga
- Time zone: UTC-5 (Eastern (EST))
  - Summer (DST): UTC-4 (EDT)

Shepard Settlement was a farming hamlet in the northeastern part of the Town of Skaneateles in Onondaga County, New York, United States.

Named for the first settlers, this was the second community founded in the Town of Skaneateles, after the Village of Skaneateles at the northern end of Skaneateles Lake. Other early settler families with numerous members in the immediate area include the Chapmans, Bishops, Horsingtons and Hares. The settlement was along Stump Road between Hoyt and Foster Roads on the west and Shepard Road on the east, centered roughly where Chapman Road ends at Stump Road. The hamlet was 2.6 miles west-northwest of the Village of Marcellus and four miles northeast of Skaneateles.

The various amenities of a rural community, such as a church and general store, have long since disappeared, leaving only Shepard Settlement Cemetery on the northwestern corner of Stump and Foster Roads to establish the community's identity.

The Shepard Settlement Cemetery was listed on the National Register of Historic Places in 2010.
