= Martisco, New York =

Hamlet in New York, United States

Coordinates: 43°01′02″N 76°20′05″W

Martisco is a hamlet in Marcellus, New York. It is the location of the Martisco Station, a historic railway station, and it is the location of the former Martisco bean company. The Martisco Station was listed on the National Register of Historic Places in 2007. Martisco was previously named "Marcellus Junction" and also "Martisco Junction". The Martisco Station was built in 1870 for the New York Central Railroad. After a century, the building was abandoned and in poor shape, the building was set to be demolished in 1964 but was stopped by the Central New York Chapter of the National Railway Historical Society who purchased the building and repaired it. Today the building is a museum that is open to the public. The hamlet of Martisco is a very historic location.
