= Whig Hill =

Historic house in New York, United States

- Whig Hill and Dependencies
- U.S. National Register of Historic Places
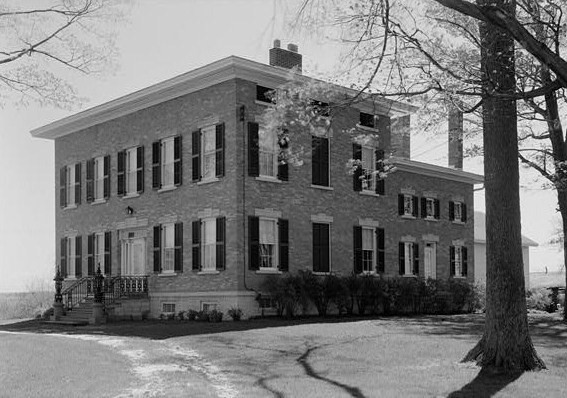
- Whig Hall

- Location within New York Location within the United States
- Location: E. of Plainville at junction of W. Genesee and Gates Rds., near Plainville, New York
- Coordinates: 43°9′33″N 76°26′1″W
- Area: 25 acres (10 ha)
- Built: 1833
- Architectural style: Greek Revival
- NRHP reference No.: 75001217
- Added to NRHP: May 12, 1975

Whig Hill is a historic home located near Plainville, Onondaga County, New York. The main house was built in 1833, and is a 2 1/2-story, five-bay, Greek Revival-style brick dwelling with a nearly flat roof. Whig Hill was the principal element within a listing Whig Hill and Dependencies, which included two barn clusters, a tenant house, and other outbuildings. The barn cluster north of Genesee Street, described in 1975, is no longer present, in 2009. The south barn remains.

It was listed on the National Register of Historic Places in 1975.
