= Robinson Site (AO67-02-0001) =

- U.S. National Register of Historic Places
- Nearest city: Cicero, New York, Brewerton, New York
- Area: 2.7 acres (1.1 ha)
- NRHP reference No.: 85000660
- Added to NRHP: March 28, 1985

The Robinson Site, also known as NYSDHP Unique Site No. AO67-02-0001, is a 2.7 acres (1.1 ha) archeological site in Brewerton, New York. Artifacts from Native American camps on the site have been found there.

Fluted projectile points were found on the Channing Robinson farm by archeologist William A. Ritchie in 1946.
