= Martisco station =

Martisco
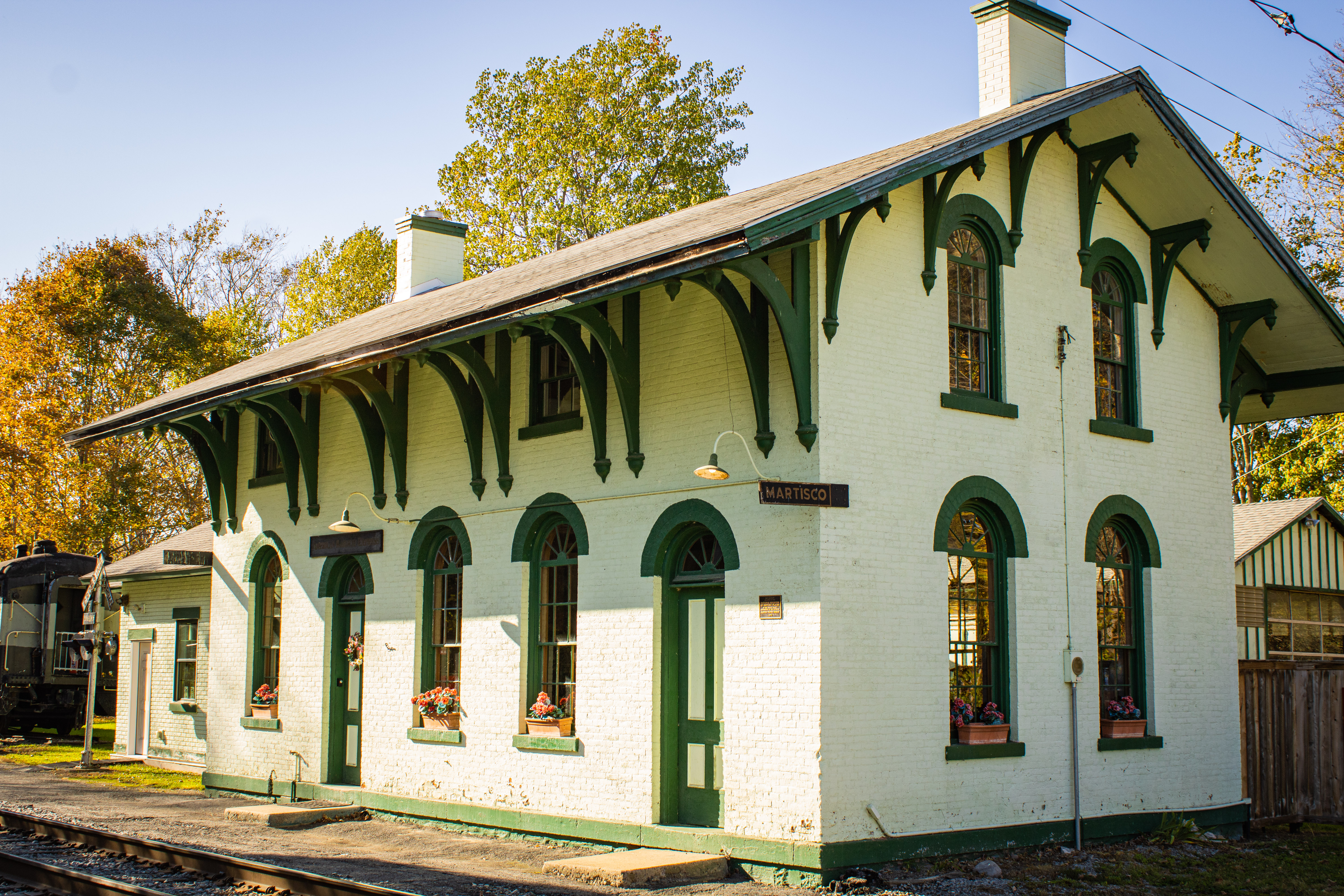
- Martisco Station, October 2021

General information
- Location: End of Martisco Road, Martisco, Onondaga County, New York
- Tracks: 1

Services
Preceding station	New York Central Railroad	Following station
Skaneateles Junction toward Rochester	Auburn Road	Camillus toward Syracuse
- Martisco Station
- U.S. National Register of Historic Places
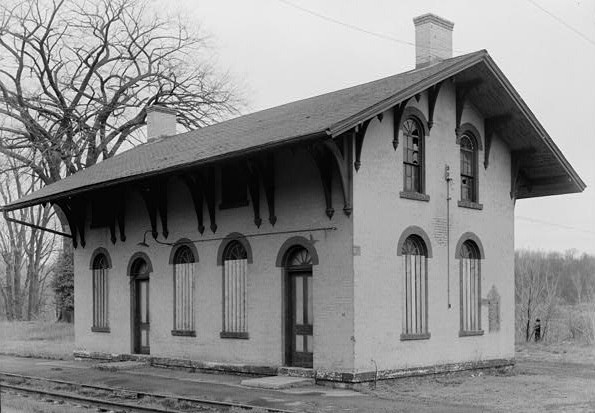
- HABS picture from 1963

- Location within New York Location within the United States
- Location: Martisco Rd., N of Lyons Rd., Martisco, New York
- Coordinates: 43°1′2″N 76°20′9″W
- Area: 1.3 acres (0.53 ha)
- Built: 1870
- Architectural style: Italianate
- NRHP reference No.: 07000292
- Added to NRHP: April 5, 2007
Location

Martisco station, also known as Martisco Station Railway Museum, is a railroad station in Martisco, Onondaga County, New York. It was built in 1870 by the Auburn and Syracuse Railroad, and is a two-story, Italianate style brick building. Decorative brackets support an unusually long overhang of the roof. The line and station were eventually acquired by the New York Central Railroad. The station is owned by the Central New York Chapter of the National Railway Historical Society, and is open as a museum during limited hours in the summer. Adjacent to the station is a contributing Pennsylvania Railroad dining car.

It was listed on the National Register of Historic Places in 2007 as Martisco Station.
