= Shepard Settlement Cemetery =

Historic cemetery in New York, United States

- U.S. National Register of Historic Places
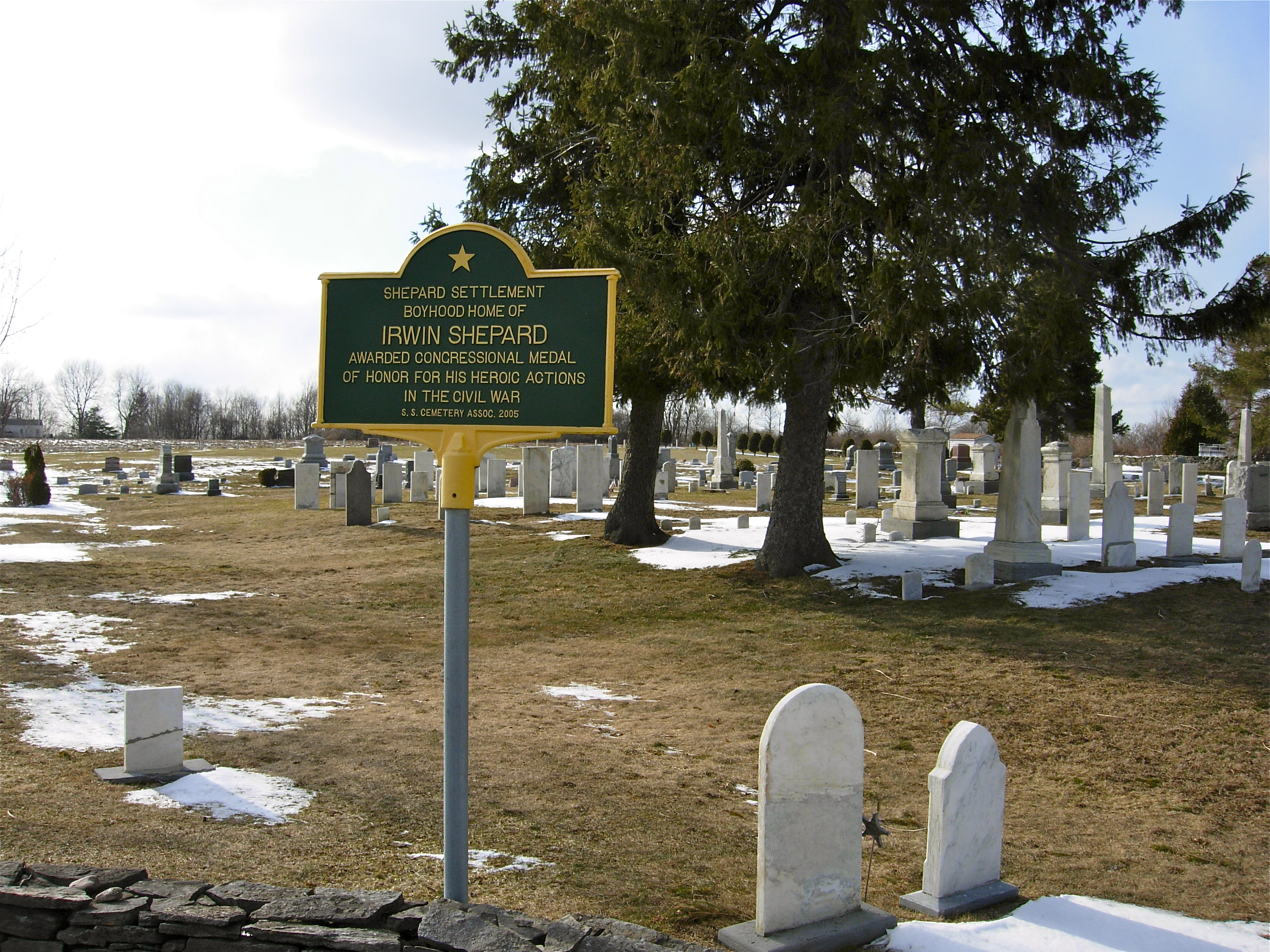
- Shepard Settlement Cemetery, March 2011

- Location within New York Location within the United States
- Location: Stump & Foster Rds, Shepard Settlement, New York
- Coordinates: 42°59′42″N 76°23′40″W
- Area: 2.56 acres (1.04 ha)
- Built: c. 1823
- NRHP reference No.: 10000938
- Added to NRHP: November 29, 2010

Shepard Settlement Cemetery is a historic cemetery located at Shepard Settlement, Onondaga County, New York. It was established about 1823, and remains an active burial ground containing approximately 500 burials. It is notable for including the graves of at least 30 veterans of all wars from the Revolutionary War to World War II. The gravestones are representative of typical funerary art of the mid-19th century.

It was listed on the National Register of Historic Places in 2010.
