= First Baptist Church of Camillus =

Historic church in New York, United States

- U.S. National Register of Historic Places
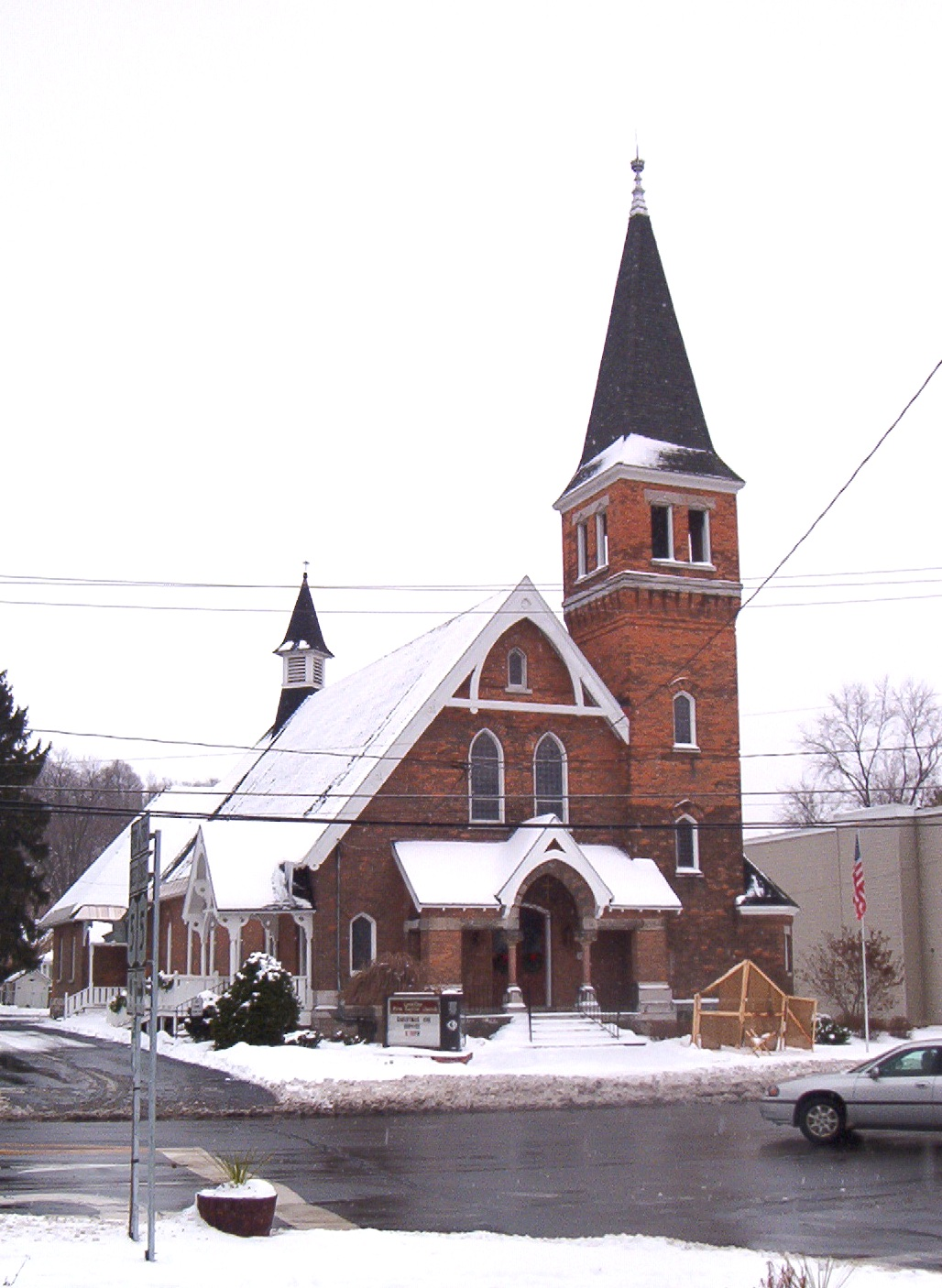

- Location within New York Location within the United States
- Location: 23 Genesee St., Camillus, New York
- Coordinates: 43°2′19.43″N 76°18′28.73″W
- Area: less than one acre
- Built: 1879
- Architect: Archimedes Russell
- Architectural style: Gothic
- NRHP reference No.: 01000573
- Added to NRHP: June 8, 2001

The First Baptist Church of Camillus is a historic Baptist church located at 23 Genesee Street in the Village of Camillus, Onondaga County, New York. It is credited to architect Archimedes Russell and built in 1879–1880. It is a brick church building consisting of a rectangular nave with a steeply pitched gable roof, corner bell tower and steeple, and a hip roofed church hall at the rear. The Camillus Baptist Church was organized in 1804.

It was listed on the National Register of Historic Places in 2001.

== Gallery ==
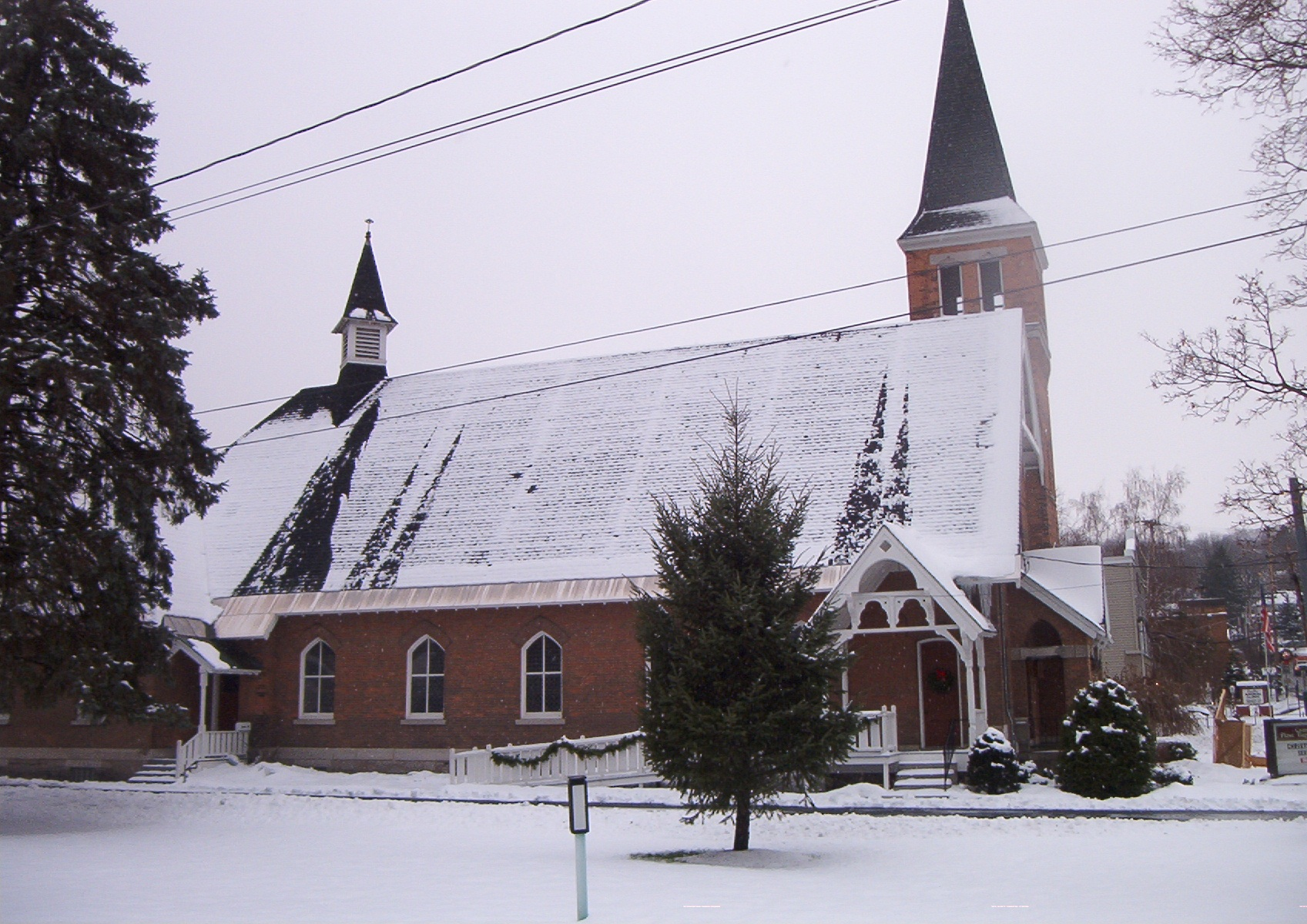

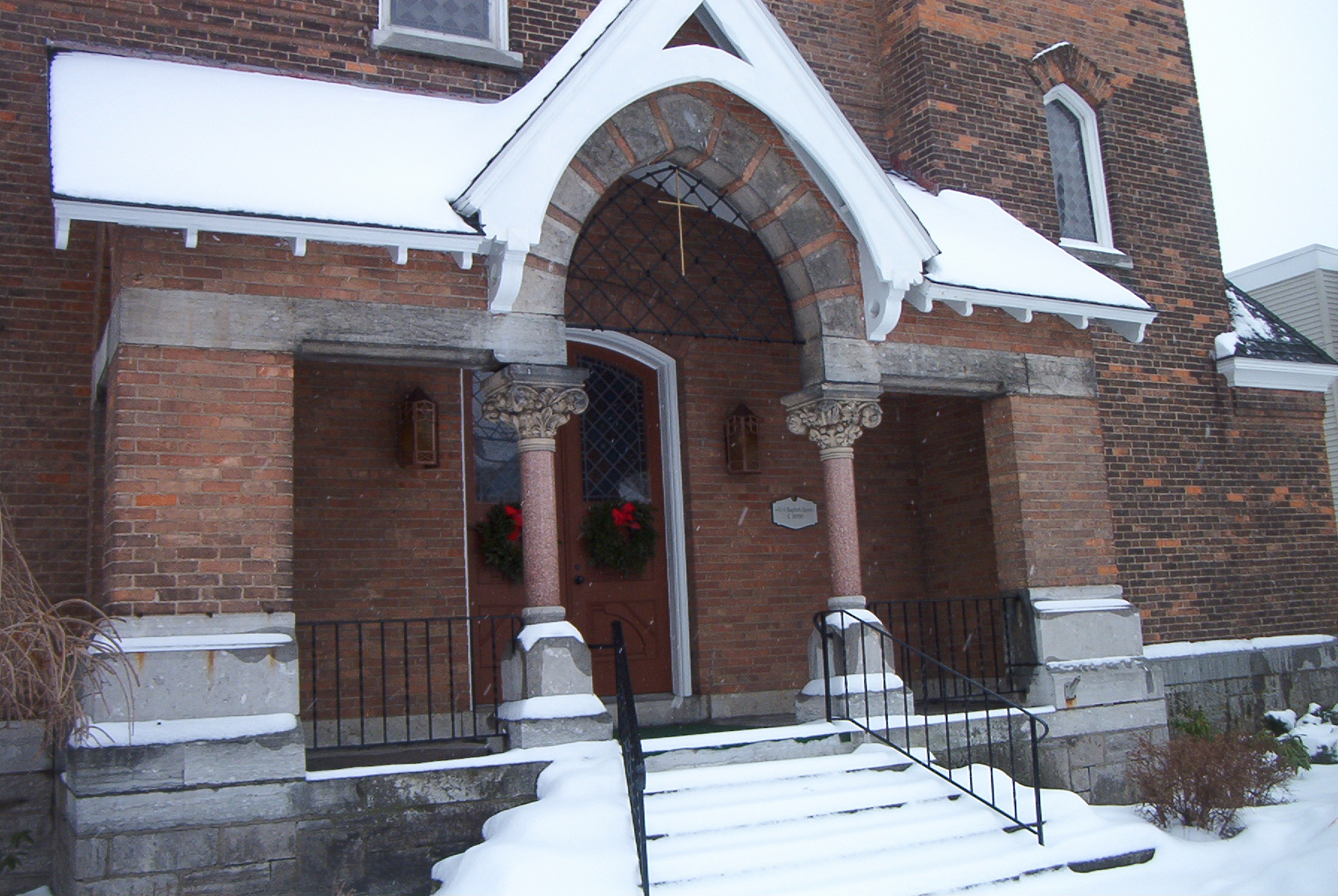

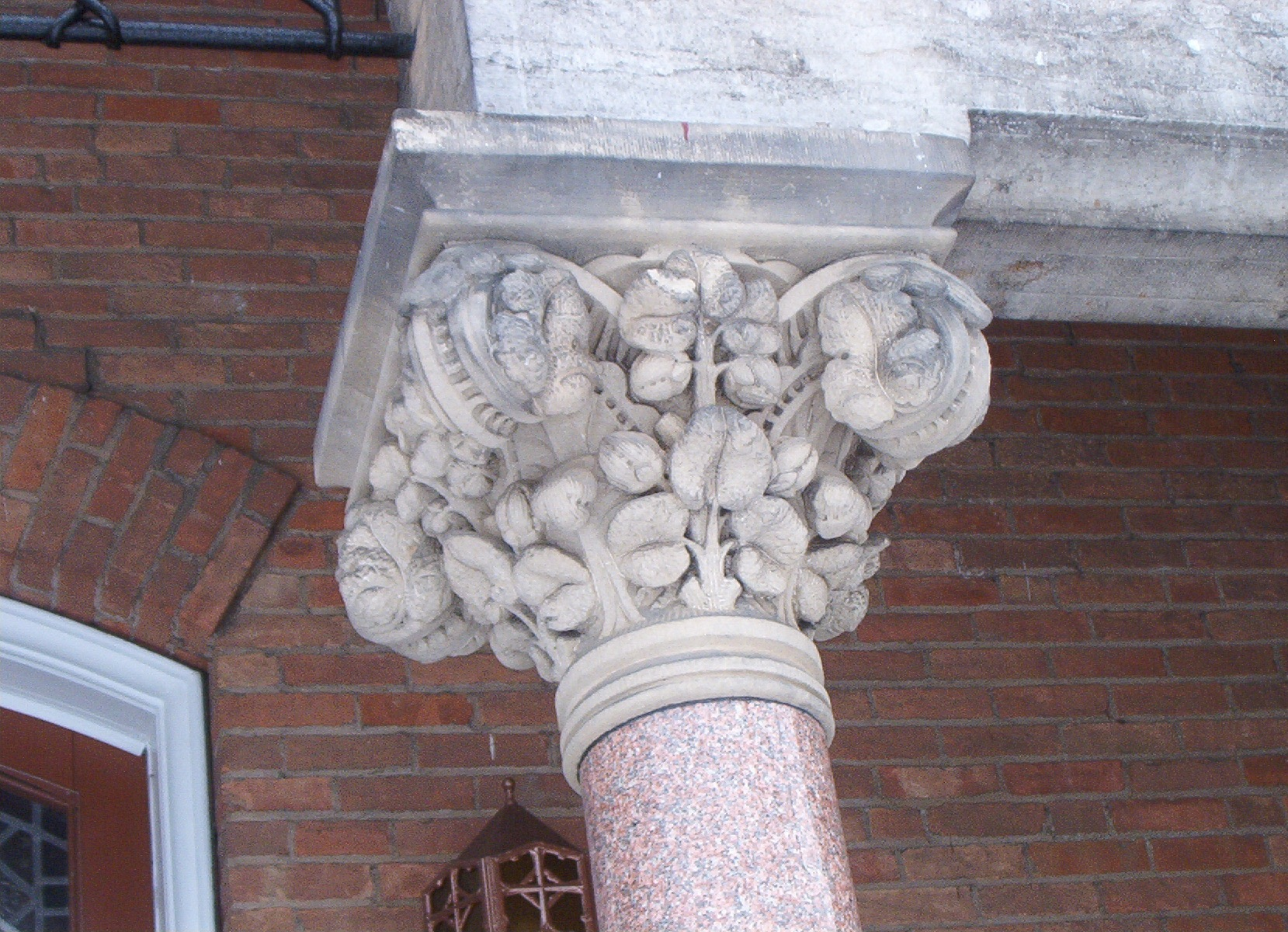
