= Borodino District School No. 8 =

- Borodino District School #8
- U.S. National Register of Historic Places
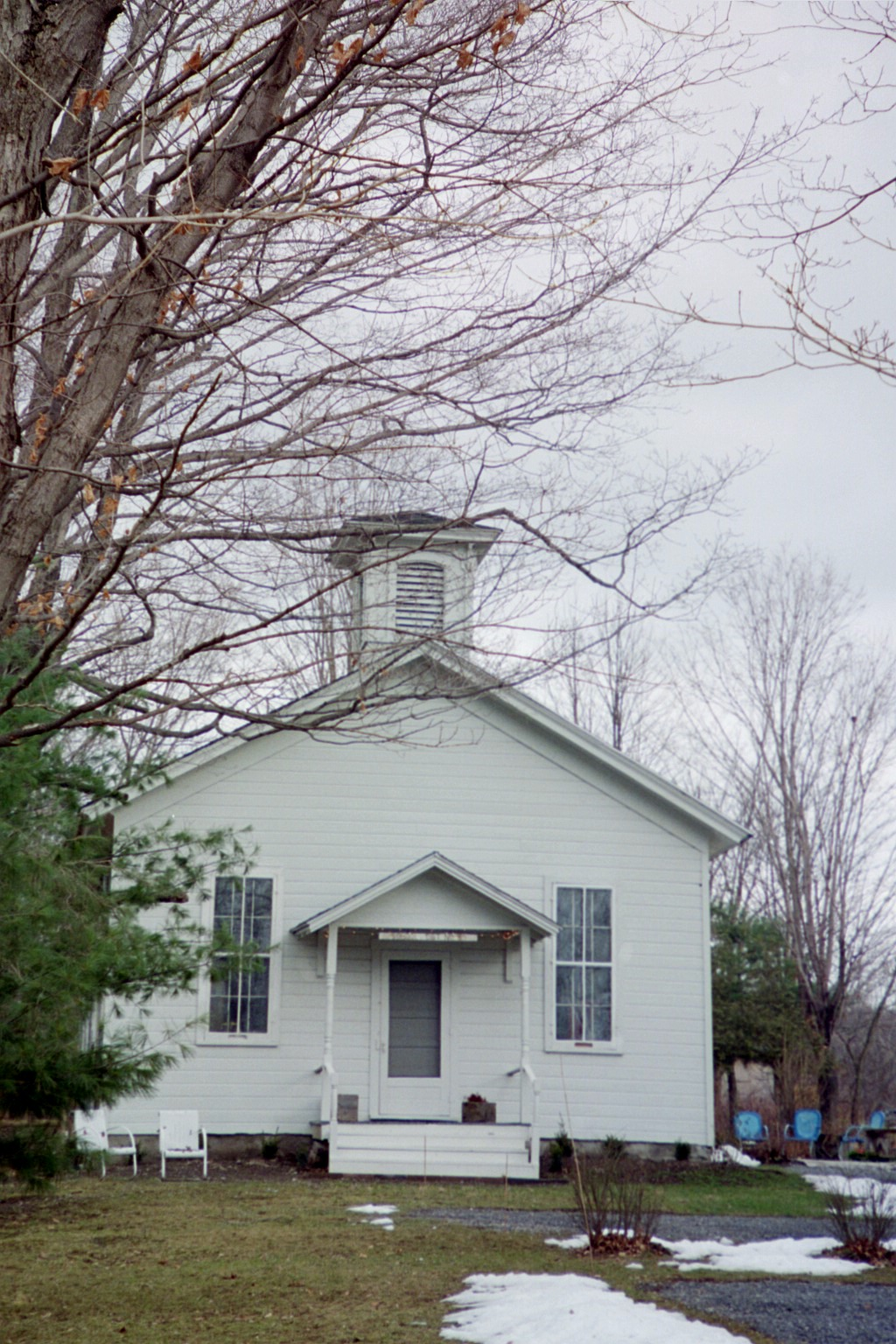

- Location within New York Location within the United States
- Nearest city: Borodino, New York
- Coordinates: 42.86106°N 76.33752°W
- Architectural style: Italianate
- NRHP reference No.: 06001206
- Added to NRHP: January 4, 2007

Borodino District School #8, known previously as Borodino District School #11, was listed on the National Register of Historic Places in 2007. The one-room schoolhouse was probably built between 1853, when the property was sold to the school trustees, and 1859 when it first appears on a map of Borodino. It is a clapboard building in the Italianate style topped by a square cupola with a gabled roof. The interior is a single room with a twelve-foot ceiling. The walls and ceiling are beaded board. Two chalkboards are still in evidence. The school closed in 1956, probably due to the lack of running water and proper toilet facilities required by law after that time.

The building operates as a seasonal store called the Borodino Market.
