= Camillus Union Free School =

- U.S. National Register of Historic Places
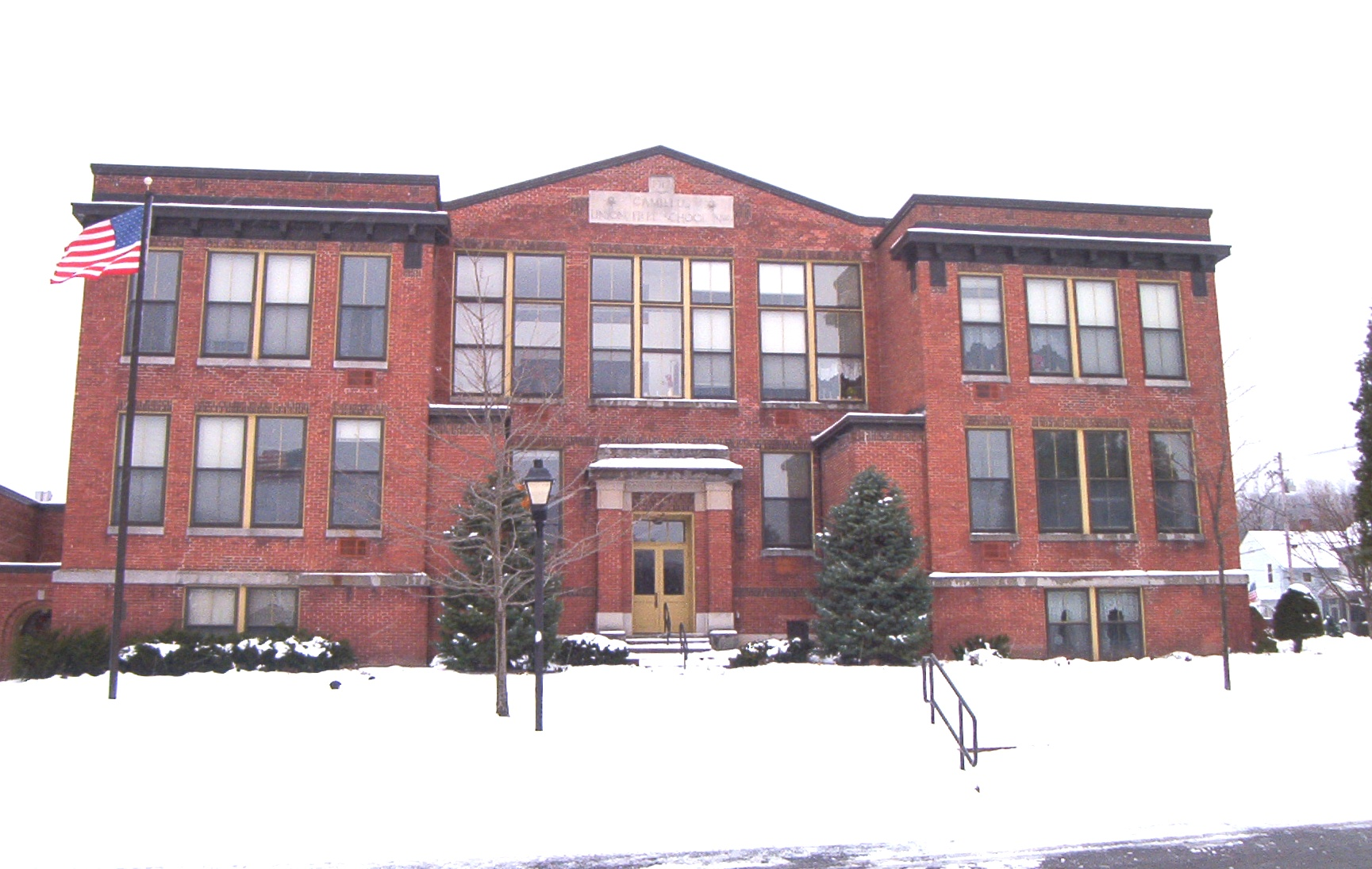

- Location within New York Location within the United States
- Location: Camillus, New York
- Coordinates: 43°2′25.97″N 76°18′21″W
- Built: 1912
- Architect: Sacket & Park; Eugene H. Sacket
- Architectural style: Classical Revival
- NRHP reference No.: 91000628
- Added to NRHP: May 28, 1991

Camillus Union Free School is a building built in 1912 and 1913 in the Village of Camillus, New York. It was listed on the National Register of Historic Places in 1991.

The original two-story school building has a U-shaped plan. It was designed by architect Eugene Sacket of Syracuse and was constructed in 1912 and 1913. A gymnasium was added in 1928 and an elementary-school wing was added in made in 1965. The original building was largely intact as of 1991, except for the loss of a cupola that was removed after a 1951 fire. The National Register listing includes the original building and the 1928 addition. The school was deemed architecturally significant as an example of a "small village school" built in the early decades of the 20th century.

It is located at First and LeRoy Streets, across a field from Nine Mile Creek. Downstream is the Nine Mile Creek Aqueduct, another Registered Historic Place.

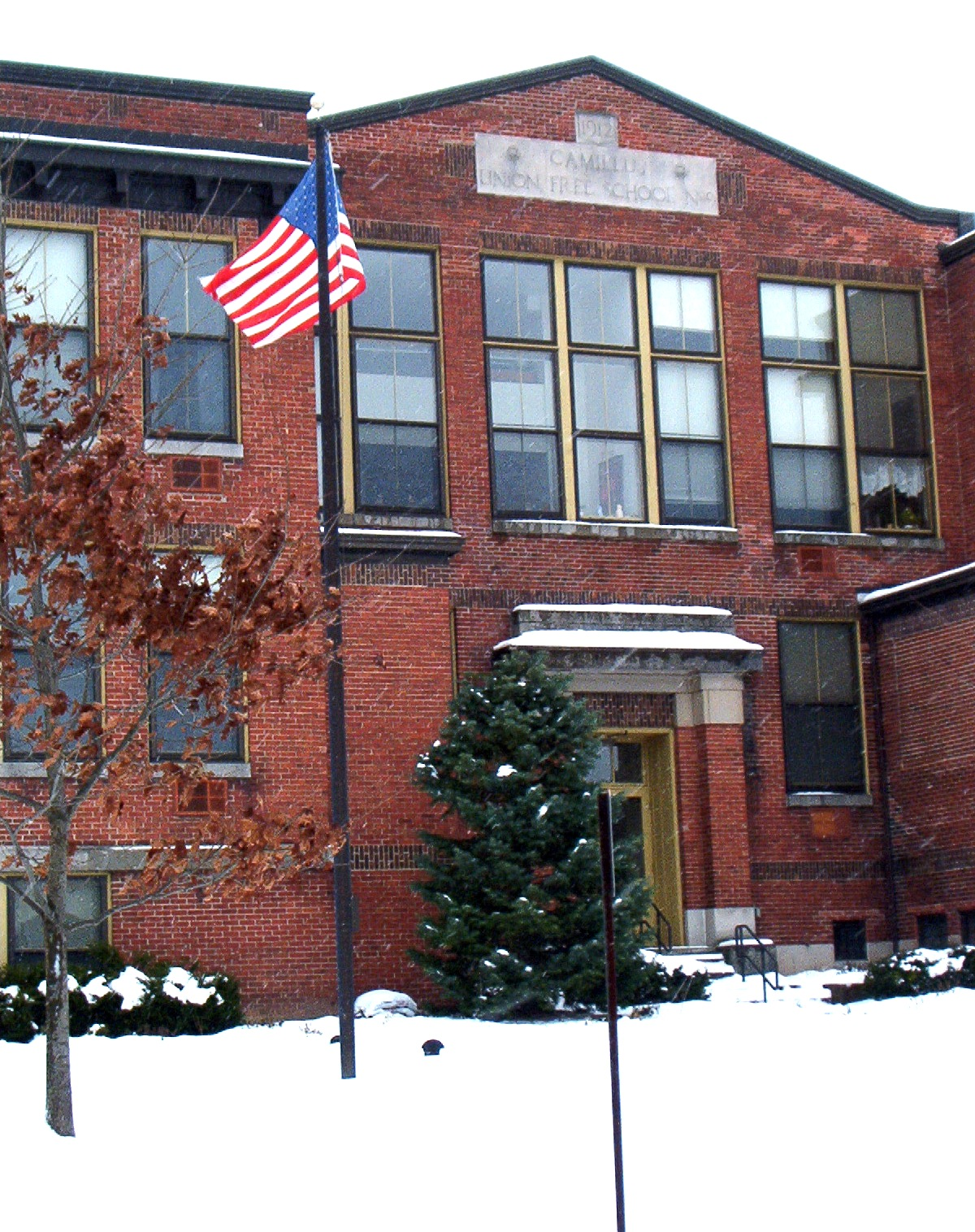
Detail

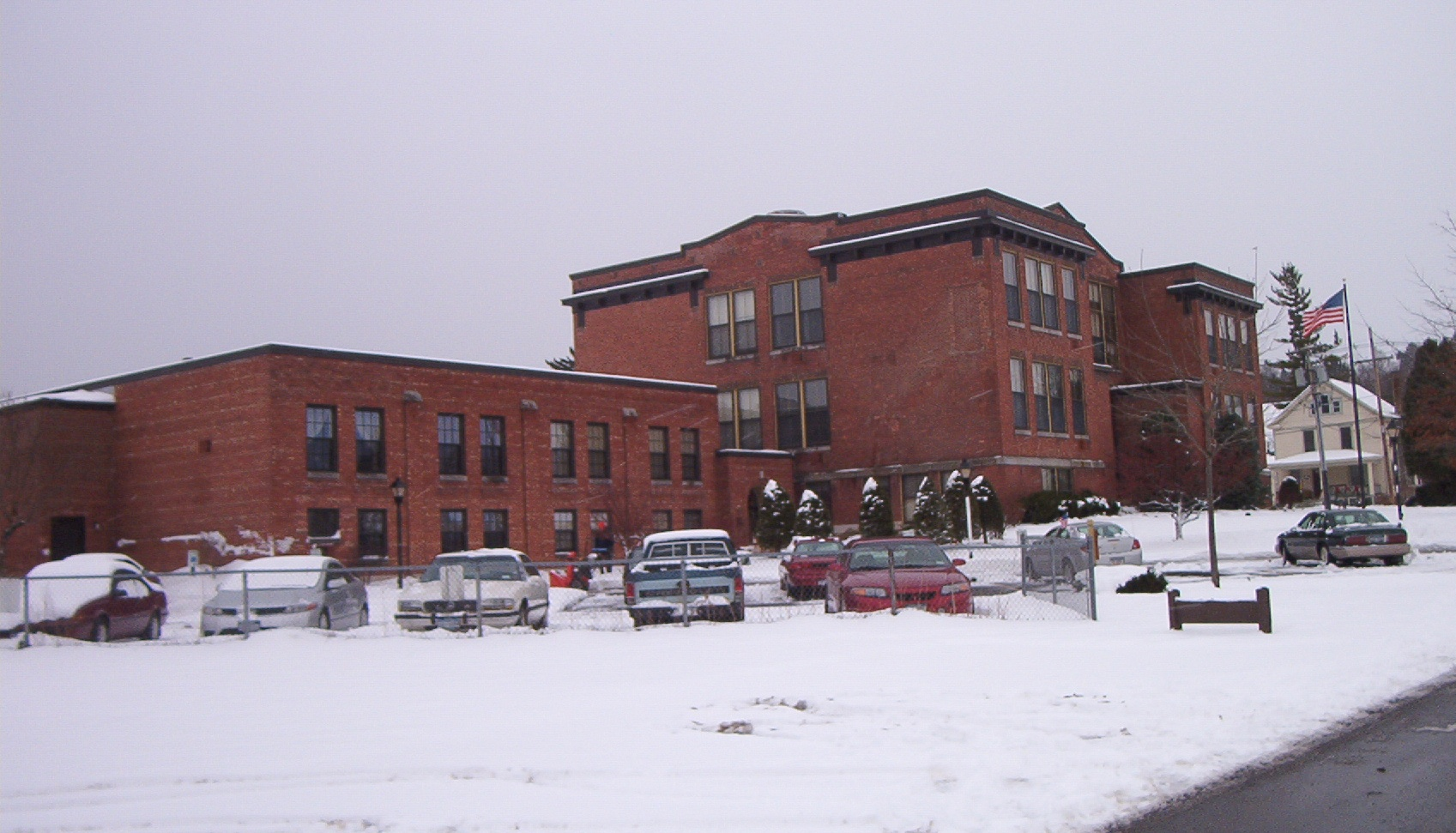
View including extension

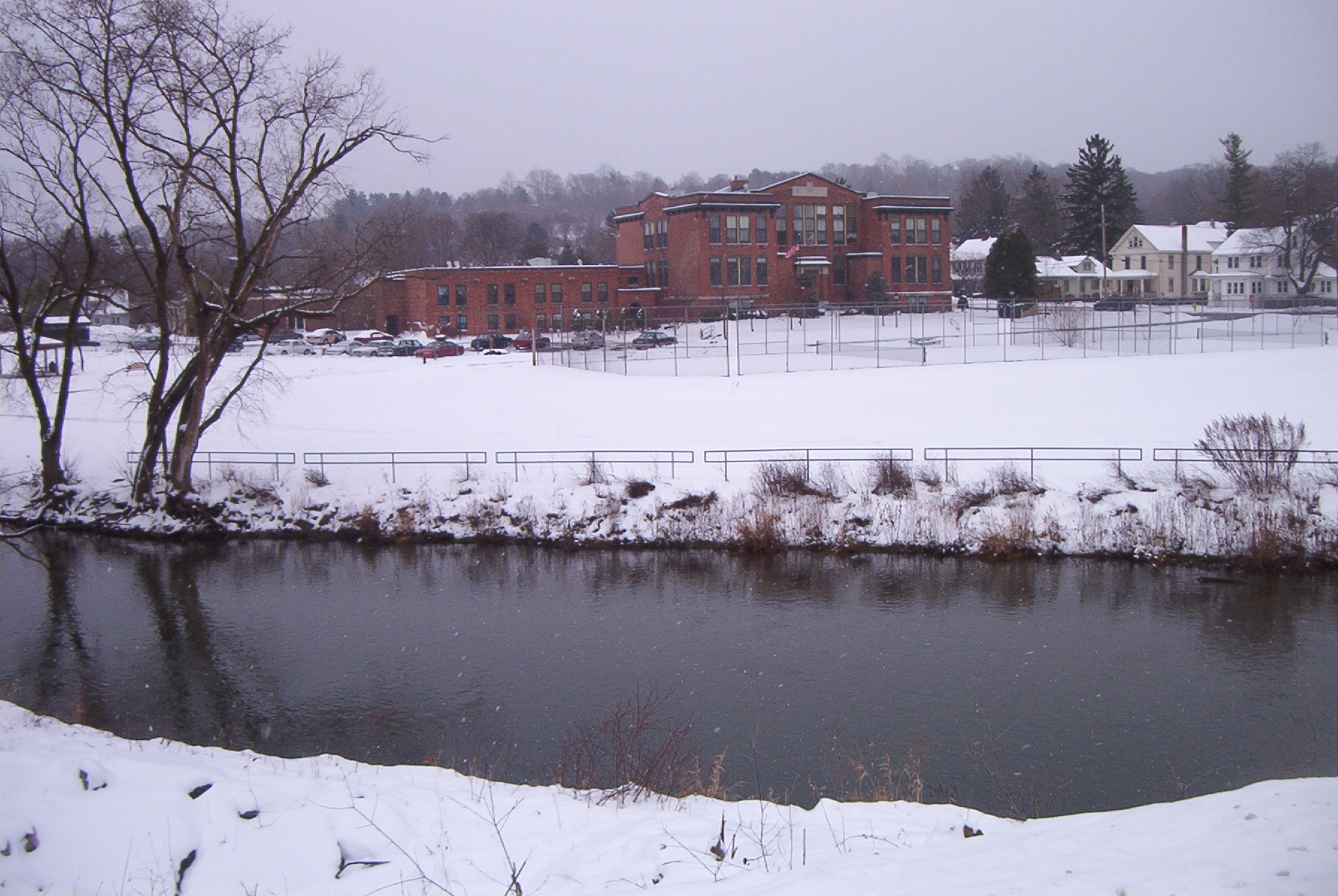
From across Nine Mile Creek
