= First Baptist Church of Memphis =

Church in Memphis, Tennessee, US

Coordinates: 43.034184°N 76.369636°W

First Baptist Church of Memphis, NY, is a Baptist Church located at 1960 West Genesee Turnpike (Route 5) in the town of Camillus, NY with an Elbridge postal address.

The church was founded in Memphis, NY (1815) and was originally called the First Baptist Church of Canton, NY. However, the name changed to its current name after finding out that there was already a town called Canton.

The first official church building was built on 6421 Bennetts Corners Road Memphis, NY in 1837.

The congregation moved its church services to 6425 Bennetts Corner Road in about 1981 to a building that was formerly used as a schoolhouse. The Auditorium, along with the foyer, were added to the building.

In February 2011, the auditorium addition collapsed after months of heavy snowfall. There were no injuries.

That building collapse led to the construction of the current building in 2012.
