= Carpenter's Brook Fish Hatchery =

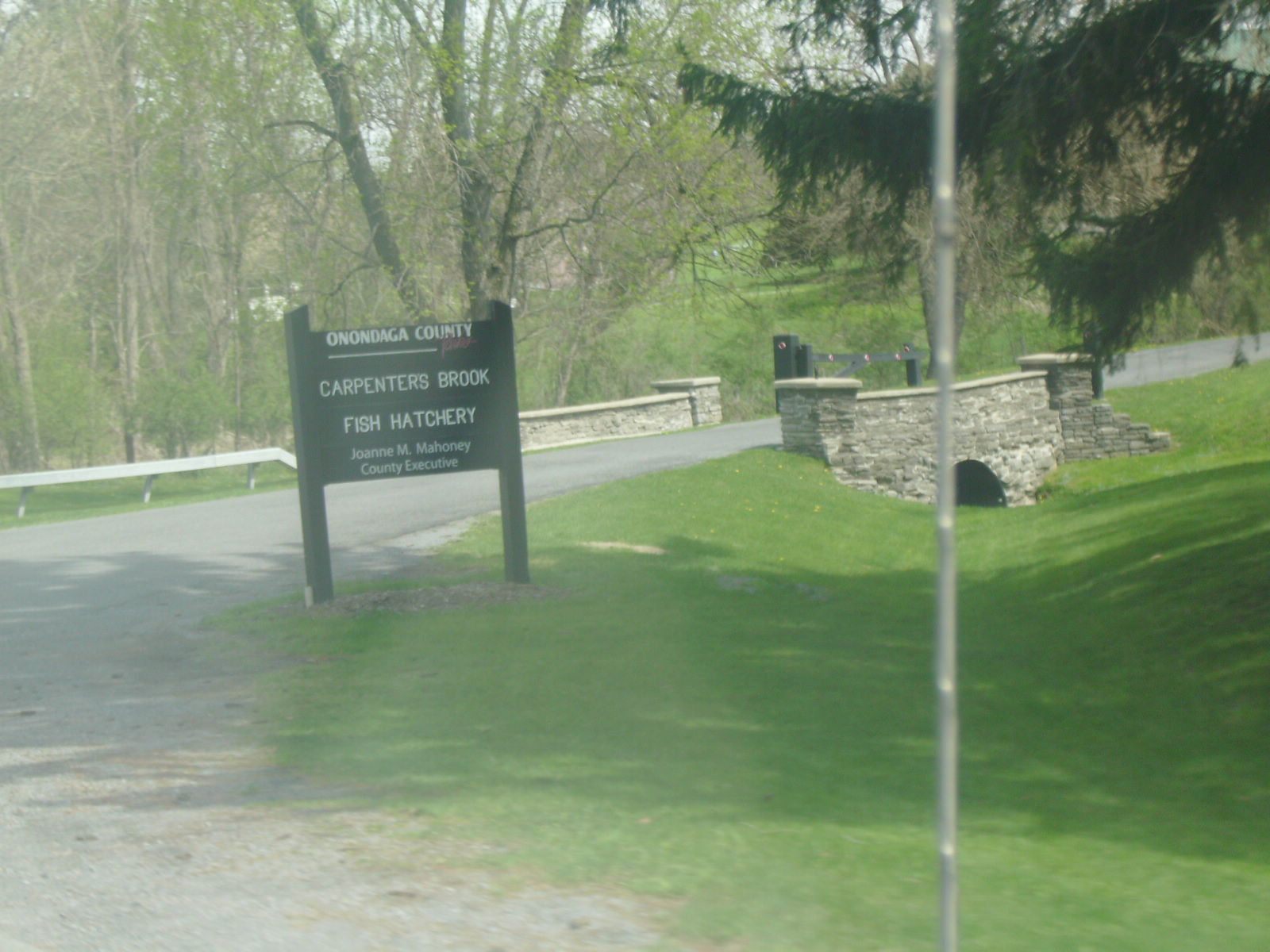
- Sign along New York State Route 321 for the fish hatchery.
- Interactive map of Carpenter's Brook Fish Hatchery
- Type: Fish hatchery
- Location: Elbridge, New York
- Coordinates: 43°00′57″N 76°23′22″W
- Created: 1938
- Operator: Onondaga County Parks
- Open: All year

Carpenter's Brook Fish Hatchery is a county-maintained fish hatchery in the town of Elbridge, New York. The fish hatchery is located along New York State Route 321, at the intersection with former New York State Route 368 (now County Route 107). The location is maintained by Onondaga County's Parks commission, running full-time around the year with certain hours. Opened in 1938, it is only one of four county-maintained fish hatcheries in the state of New York at the current time. The fish hatchery produces over 70,000 trout annually. The staff of the hatchery, along with other volunteers, help fund retail sales and local fish stores with $4 million annually.

== History ==
In the 19th Century, the national fish stocking system was a large need, and the national system of using fish hatcheries was started in the 1870s.

The fish hatchery was opened on its current location along NY 321 in 1938. The fish hatchery was a subsidy of the U.S. Fish and Wildlife Service and a service from Onondaga County. This was started when the New Deal started the Works Progress Administration, which helped develop the project.
