= New York State Route 368 =

Former highway in New York

New York State Route 368
- Halfway Road
- Map of the Syracuse area with NY 368 highlighted in red

Route information
- Maintained by NYSDOT
- Length: 1.68 mi (2.70 km)
- Existed: 1930s–April 1, 1980

Major junctions
- South end: NY 321 in Elbridge
- North end: NY 5 in Elbridge

Location
- Country: United States
- State: New York
- Counties: Onondaga

Highway system
- New York Highways; Interstate; US; State; Reference; Parkways
← NY 367	→ NY 369

New York State Route 368 (NY 368) was a state highway in Onondaga County, New York, in the United States. It was one of the shortest routes in the county, extending for only 1.69 miles (2.72 km) between NY 321 and NY 5 in the town of Elbridge. NY 368 was known as Halfway Road for the hamlet it served near its midpoint. The route was assigned in the 1930s and removed in 1980 as part of a highway maintenance swap between the state of New York and Onondaga County.

== Route description ==
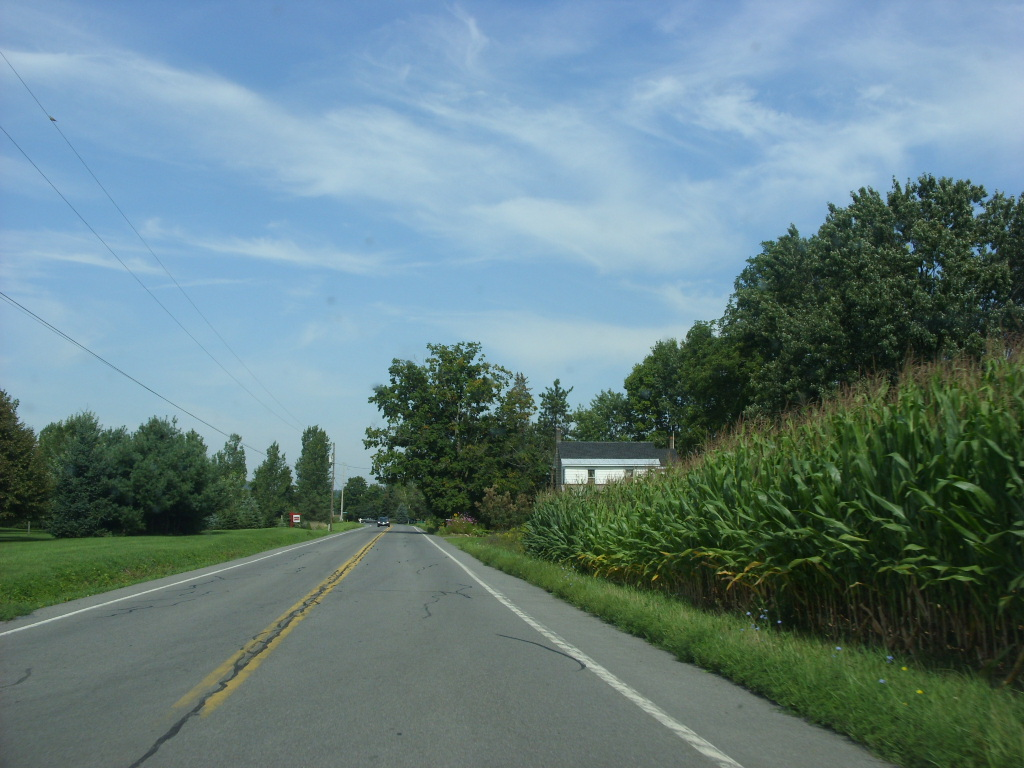
2008 photo of CR 107 (former NY 368)

NY 368 began at an intersection with NY 321 adjacent to the Carpenter's Brook Fish Hatchery in the town of Elbridge. The route headed north as Halfway Road, passing by farmland as it headed through a rural area of Onondaga County to the small hamlet of Halfway. Here, NY 368 served a small number of homes as it crossed a Conrail railroad line (now part of the Finger Lakes Railway) at the center of the community. Outside of Halfway, the route turned to the northwest toward the village of Elbridge, avoiding a marshy area directly north of Halfway. It intersected with Lynch Road and Campbell Road before turning slightly northward and following Carpenter's Brook through another undeveloped area to an intersection with NY 5 east of the village, where NY 368 ended.

== History ==
NY 368 was assigned in the 1930s as a connector between NY 321 and NY 5 in the town of Elbridge by way of the hamlet of Halfway. It remained unchanged until April 1, 1980, when ownership and maintenance of the route was transferred from the state of New York to Onondaga County as part of a highway maintenance swap between the two levels of government. The county also assumed ownership and maintenance of the Onondaga County portion of NY 31B as part of the exchange. NY 368 was redesignated as County Route 107 (CR 107) following the swap.

== Major intersections ==
The entire route was in Elbridge, Onondaga County.

mi	km	Destinations	Notes
0.00	0.00	NY 321	Southern terminus
1.68	2.70	NY 5	Northern terminus
1.000 mi = 1.609 km; 1.000 km = 0.621 mi

== See also ==
- List of county routes in Onondaga County, New York
