= New York State Route 321 =

State highway in Onondaga County, New York, US

New York State Route 321
- NY 321 highlighted in red and NY 931F in blue

Route information
- Maintained by NYSDOT and Onondaga County
- Length: 8.45 mi (13.60 km)
- Existed: 1930–present

Major junctions
- South end: US 20 in Skaneateles
- North end: NY 5 in Camillus

Location
- Country: United States
- State: New York
- Counties: Onondaga

Highway system
- New York Highways; Interstate; US; State; Reference; Parkways
← NY 320	→ NY 322

New York State Route 321 (NY 321) is a 8.45-mile-long (13.60 km) state highway in Onondaga County, New York, in the United States. The southern terminus of the route is at an intersection with U.S. Route 20 (US 20) in the village of Skaneateles. Its northern terminus is at an intersection with NY 5 in Bennetts Corners, a hamlet within the town of Camillus. NY 321 is predominantly a north–south highway; however, a portion of the route through the towns of Elbridge and Camillus follows an east–west alignment. The portion of NY 321 in Camillus between Forward Road and NY 5 is maintained by Onondaga County as part of County Route 66 (CR 66), a route that continues north of NY 5 to Memphis.

The majority of NY 321's routing was originally designated as part of NY 26 in 1924. NY 26 continued east to the village of Camillus by way of Forward Road and modern NY 174. All of NY 26 north of Skaneateles was renumbered to NY 321 as part of the 1930 renumbering of state highways in New York. It initially overlapped NY 174 from Forward Road to Camillus; however, this concurrency was eliminated in the 1960s. NY 321 was rerouted to follow Bennetts Corners Road in the 1980s.

== Route description ==
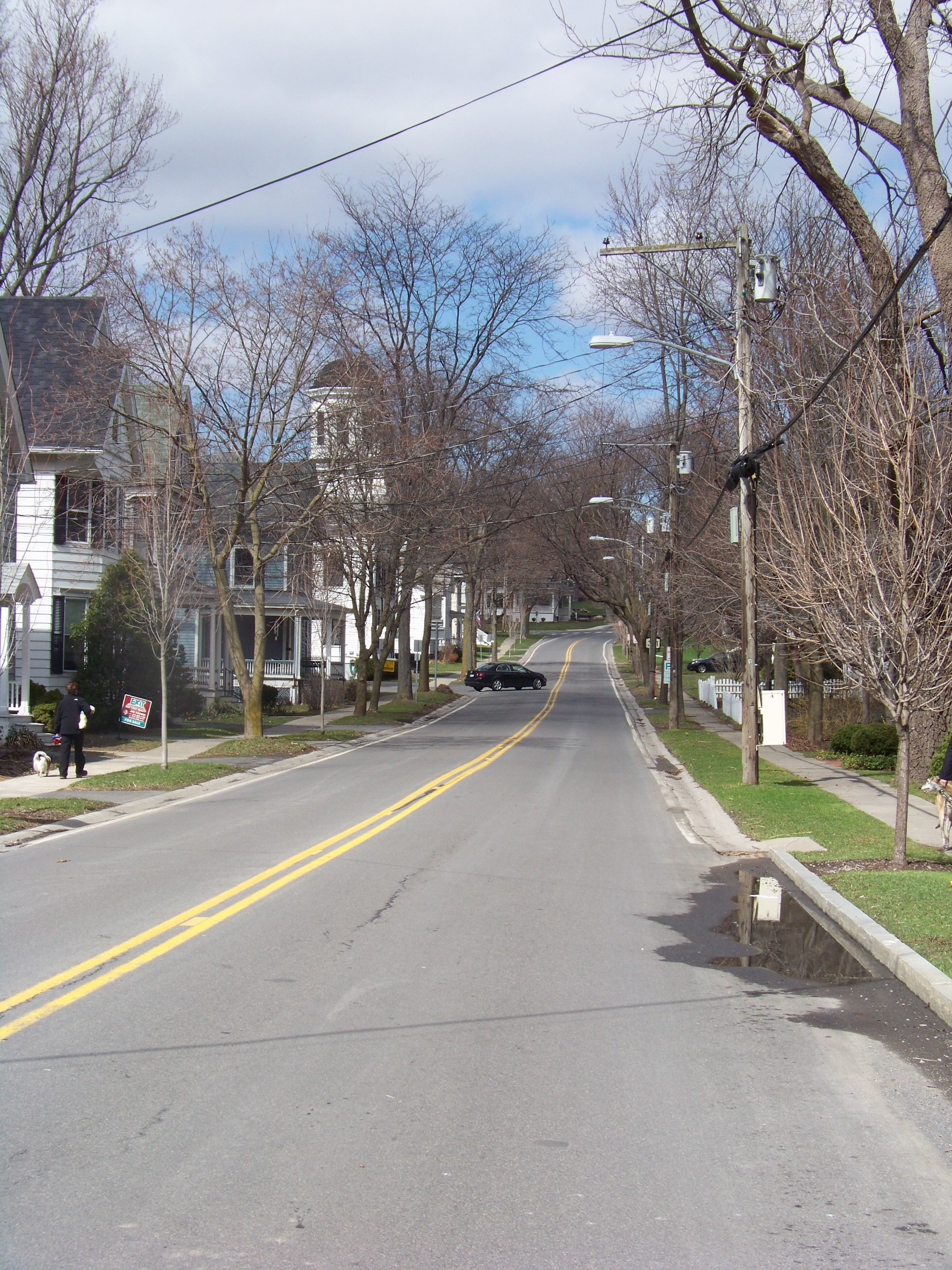
NY 321 heading northbound from US 20 in Skaneateles

NY 321 begins at an intersection with US 20 (West Genesee Street) in the Onondaga County village of Skaneateles. The highway, at first, heads northward, intersecting with local streets in the village. After leaving the village and entering the town of the same name, the highway intersects with the Old Seneca Turnpike (CR 133). NY 321 continues northward, then veers east as it crosses into the town of Elbridge.

In Elbridge, NY 321 intersects with several county routes, including Halfway Road (CR 107; former NY 368), a connector highway leading to the hamlet of Halfway. Soon afterwards, NY 321 turns to the northeast, heading towards NY 5. The highway intersects Forward Road (unsigned NY 931F) just inside the Camillus town line soon after the turn. Forward Road, a local road that passes through a mixture of open fields and forests, serves as a connector between NY 321 and NY 174.

Past Forward Road, NY 321 becomes concurrent with CR 66 as maintenance of the roadway shifts from the New York State Department of Transportation to Onondaga County. The state designation comes to an end at NY 5 in the hamlet of Bennetts Corners west of the village of Camillus shortly after; however, CR 66 continues onward.

== History ==
=== Origins ===
The town of Skaneateles was incorporated in the 1800s to help build highways in the area. The highways that were proposed were to be built with stone and other materials. Construction began in 1911 on a highway between the Skaneateles–Elbridge town line and the hamlet of Martisco within the town of Camillus. It was accepted into the New York state highway system on September 17, 1912. An extension of the road south into the town of Skaneateles to the village of the same name was constructed in late 1912 and early 1913 and added to the state highway system in September 1913.

When the first set of posted routes in New York were assigned in 1924, the Skaneateles–Martisco highway was included as part of NY 26, a route extending from Ithaca to Syracuse by way of Skaneateles. North of Martisco, NY 26 followed Ninemile Creek to the village of Camillus, where it intersected NY 5A (later NY 5).

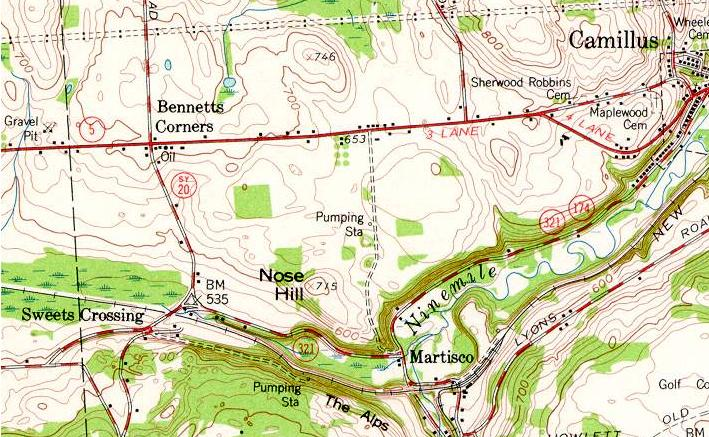
1957 USGS topographic map of Camillus. NY 321 is shown here on its original alignment while NY 20SY is routed on Bennetts Corners Road

=== NY 321 designation ===
NY 26 was split into several different routes as part of the 1930 renumbering of state highways in New York. The segment of former NY 26 between US 20 in Skaneateles and NY 5 in Camillus was renumbered to NY 321. It initially overlapped with NY 174 from Martisco to Camillus. The overlap remained in place until the 1960s when NY 321 was truncated to the southern end of the concurrency in Martisco.

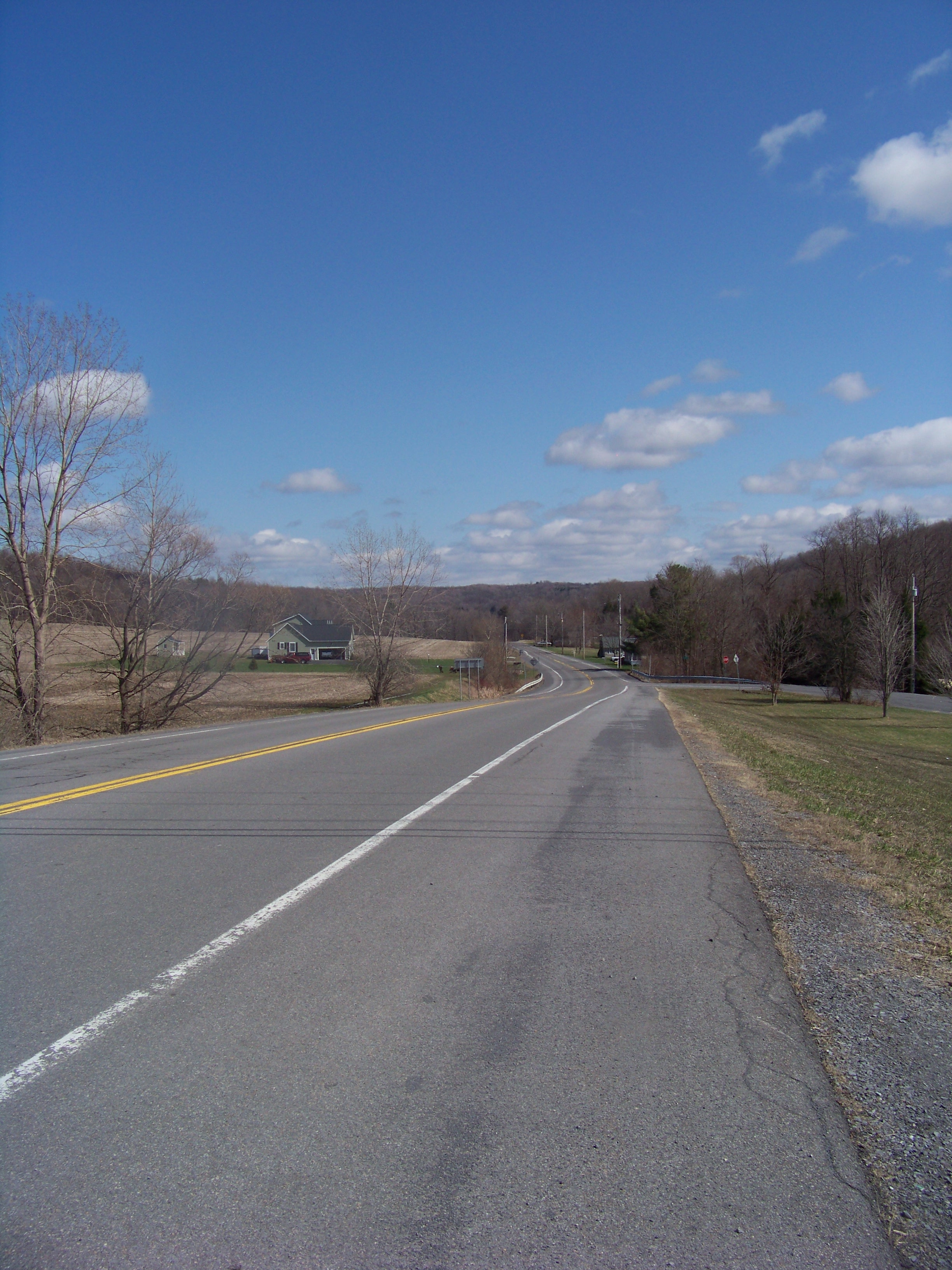
Looking eastward along Forward Road (NY 931F) from junction with NY 321

In the early 1950s, the portion of NY 321 south of Forward Road was co-designated as part of NY 20SY, a largely alternate routing of US 20 between Skaneateles and Manlius via Syracuse. Past Sweets Corners, NY 20SY continued north on a previously unnumbered roadway to NY 5 at Bennetts Corners, where it joined NY 5 east into Camillus. The NY 20SY designation was removed in 1961, leaving Bennetts Corners Road from Forward Road to NY 5 as an unnumbered roadway once again.

NY 321 was rerouted in the late 1980s to follow Bennetts Corners Road to NY 5. This part of NY 321 overlapped CR 66, a highway that began at the junction of Forward and Bennetts Corners Roads and ended in the hamlet of Memphis, and thus became maintained by Onondaga County. The former routing of NY 321 along Forward Road is now designated as NY 931F, an unsigned reference route 1.16 miles (1.87 km) in length.

== Major intersections ==
The entire route is in Onondaga County.

Location	mi	km	Destinations	Notes
Village of Skaneateles	0.00	0.00	US 20 – Auburn, LaFayette, Cazenovia	Southern terminus
Town of Elbridge	6.01	9.67	CR 107 (Halfway Road) – Elbridge	Former southern terminus of NY 368
Town of Camillus	7.64	12.30	NY 931F (Forward Road) – Marcellus	Former routing of NY 321; western terminus of unsigned NY 931F
Town of Camillus	8.45	13.60	NY 5 – Elbridge, Camillus	Northern terminus
1.000 mi = 1.609 km; 1.000 km = 0.621 mi

== See also ==
- List of county routes in Onondaga County, New York
