= Wellsburg, New York =

- Village
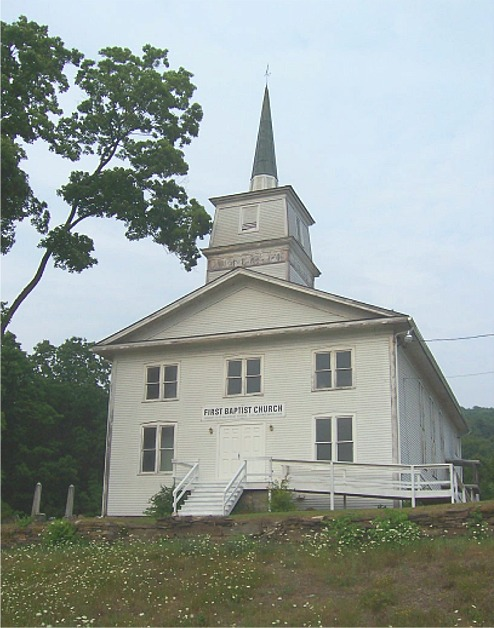
- The First Baptist Church in Wellsburg, built by settlers in the 1790s

- Location within the state of New York
- Coordinates: 42°0′40″N 76°43′40″W
- Country: United States
- State: New York
- County: Chemung
- Town: Ashland

Area
  - Total: 0.58 sq mi (1.49 km^{2})
  - Land: 0.57 sq mi (1.47 km^{2})
  - Water: 0.0077 sq mi (0.02 km^{2})
- Elevation: 827 ft (252 m)

Population (2020)
  - Total: 490
  - Density: 862.5/sq mi (333.02/km^{2})
- Time zone: UTC-5 (Eastern (EST))
  - Summer (DST): UTC-4 (EDT)
- ZIP code: 14894
- Area code: 607
- FIPS code: 36-79081
- GNIS feature ID: 0969051
- Website: villageofwellsburg.com

Wellsburg is a village in Chemung County, New York, United States. As of the 2020 census, Wellsburg had a population of 490. The village is named after the pioneer family of Abner Wells (1737–1797) who came from Southold on Long Island.

Wellsburg is located in the southeast part of the town of Ashland. It is southeast of the city of Elmira and is part of the Elmira Metropolitan Statistical Area.

== History ==
The area was settled around 1788. The village was incorporated in 1872.

Christ Episcopal Church was listed on the National Register of Historic Places in 2000.

In the 1930s, there were also a Methodist and a Baptist church. Catholics attended services in a church about 18 miles (29 km) across the Pennsylvania border (Centerville or Bentley Creek). The village contained two bars, two grocery stores (Aber and Stanton), Dalton's meat market, two gas stations, a "creamery", an Erie Railroad depot, Dalton's coal yard, a deteriorated Hotel Alcazar, a post office, and Schuyler's Feed, Grain & Lumber Yard. A four-story school served grades 1–12, with a small playground and a ballfield. Some students were bussed in from surrounding areas. One day in 1939, an "autogyro" landed on that ballfield and remained a short time. Wellsburg had a mayor and a constable; the latter being rather "adept" at catching those who overturned outhouses during Halloween.

Occasionally the Chemung River would overflow, usually flooding the short road between Wellsburg and Lowman, but it once flooded Wellsburg to the extent that rowboats could enter the Methodist church. Local farmers hired kids to do farm chores, usually at $0.50 per-day. Youngsters driving tractors into town (for gas) were a familiar sight. During the WWII years, students aged 14 and up were allowed days off from school to help local farmers harvest their crops. There was also an "airplane spotter's shack" on the side of a hill, during the war; teens often served as "spotters".

== Geography ==
Wellsburg is located in southern Chemung County at 42°0′40″N 76°43′40″W (42.011211, -76.727753).

According to the United States Census Bureau, the village has a total area of 0.58 square miles (1.5 km^{2}), of which 0.008 square miles (0.02 km^{2}), or 1.52%, is water.

Wellsburg is on the south bank of the Chemung River, a tributary of the Susquehanna River, and is adjacent to the Pennsylvania border. Bentley Creek flows northward through the village to the Chemung River and was a power source to early pioneers.

NY-367 (Main Street) intersects NY-427 in the village. County Road 8 enters the village from the north.

== Demographics ==
Historical population
Census	Pop.	Note	%±
1870	542		—
1880	634		17.0%
1900	536		—
1910	432		−19.4%
1920	465		7.6%
1930	581		24.9%
1940	560		−3.6%
1950	638		13.9%
1960	643		0.8%
1970	779		21.2%
1980	647		−16.9%
1990	617		−4.6%
2000	631		2.3%
2010	580		−8.1%
2020	490		−15.5%
U.S. Decennial Census

As of the census of 2000, there were 631 people, 243 households, and 164 families residing in the village. The population density was 1,107.0 inhabitants per square mile (427.4/km^{2}). There were 261 housing units at an average density of 457.9 per square mile (176.8/km^{2}). The racial makeup of the village was 98.73% White, 0.32% African American, and 0.95% from two or more races. Hispanic or Latino of any race were 0.48% of the population.

There were 243 households, out of which 32.5% had children under the age of 18 living with them, 51.4% were married couples living together, 7.0% had a female householder with no husband present, and 32.1% were non-families. 27.2% of all households were made up of individuals, and 15.6% had someone living alone who was 65 years of age or older. The average household size was 2.56 and the average family size was 3.10.

In the village, the population was spread out, with 27.6% under the age of 18, 7.3% from 18 to 24, 26.1% from 25 to 44, 22.0% from 45 to 64, and 17.0% who were 65 years of age or older. The median age was 38 years. For every 100 females, there were 101.0 males. For every 100 females age 18 and over, there were 98.7 males.

The median income for a household in the village was $34,135, and the median income for a family was $40,750. Males had a median income of $30,000 versus $18,594 for females. The per capita income for the village was $17,426. About 10.9% of families and 13.7% of the population were below the poverty line, including 16.1% of those under age 18 and 4.0% of those age 65 or over.

== Education ==
It is in the Elmira City School District.

As of 2004 the zoned elementary school is Pine City School. The zoned middle and high schools for the entire school district are Ernie Davis Academy (middle school) and Elmira High School. Prior to 2014, the school district had two sets of middle and high schools, with students south of the Chemung River assigned to Broadway Middle School and Southside High School.
