= Christ Episcopal Church (Wellsburg, New York) =

Historic church in New York, United States

- U.S. National Register of Historic Places
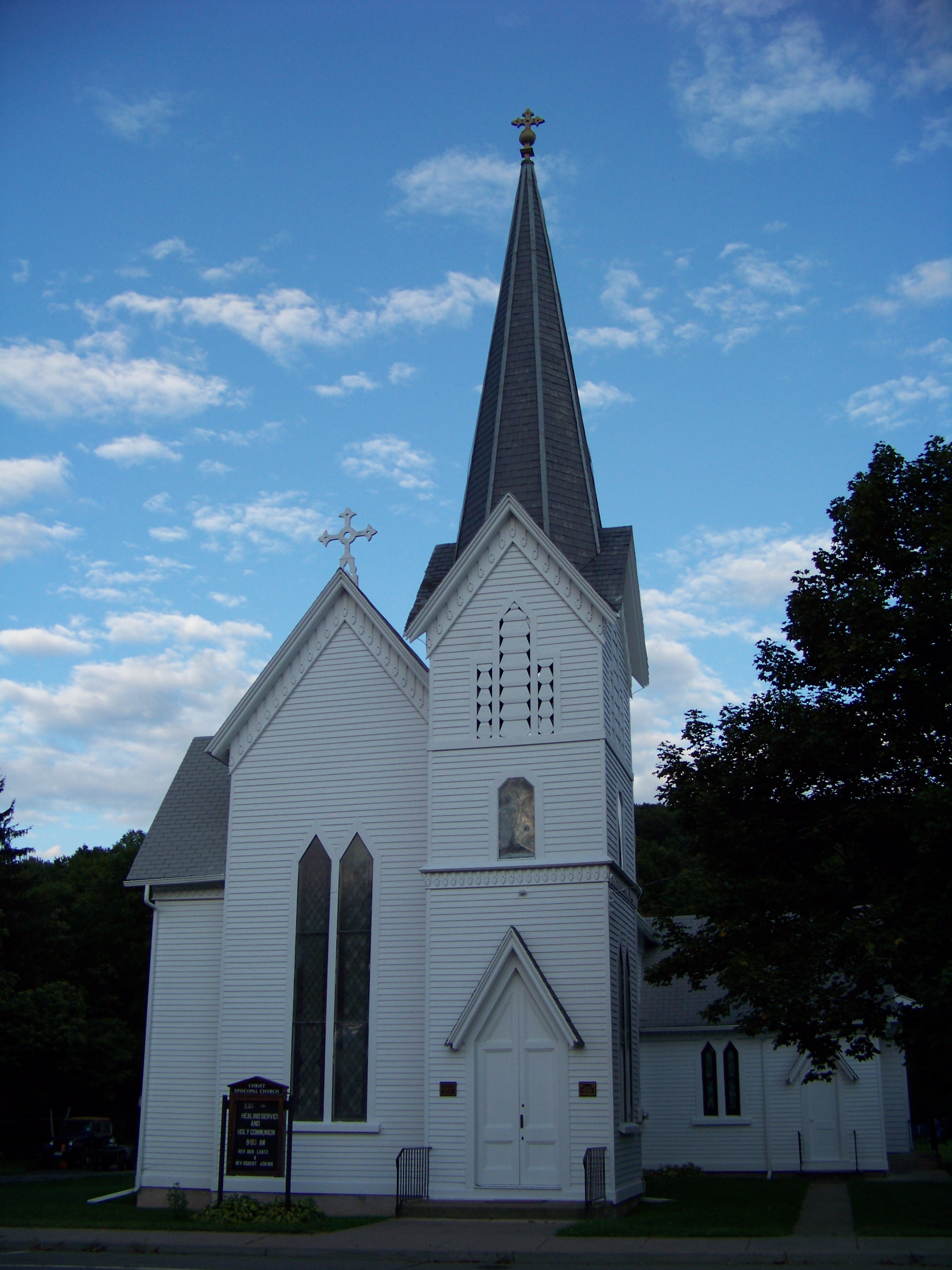

- Location within New York Location within the United States
- Location: Wellsburg, New York
- Coordinates: 42°0′54″N 76°43′39″W
- Built: 1869
- Architect: Perry, Issac G.; Fishler, George W.
- Architectural style: Gothic Revival
- MPS: Historic Churches of the Episcopal Diocese of Central New York MPS
- NRHP reference No.: 00000879
- Added to NRHP: August 2, 2000

Located at 280 Main Street, Wellsburg, New York, Christ Episcopal Church was built in 1869. The church was designed by Isaac G. Perry, of Binghamton, New York. It was listed on the National Register of Historic Places in 2000.
