= Ashland, Chemung County, New York =

Ashland, New York
- Town
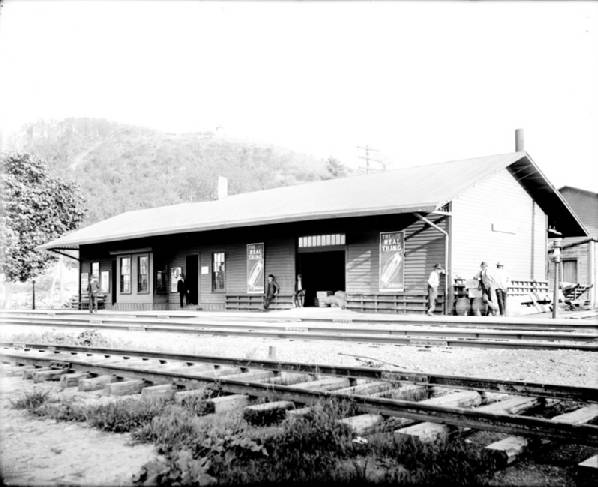
- Wellsburg, the main village in Ashland

- Location within New York Location within the United States
- Coordinates: 42°1′21″N 76°44′22″W
- Country: United States
- State: New York
- County: Chemung

Government
  - Type: Town Council
  - Town Supervisor: Vern K. Robinson
  - Town Council: Members' List: • John E. Bundy; • Andrew Gee; • Tessa J. Moore; • James Van Galder

Area
  - Total: 14.54 sq mi (37.65 km^{2})
  - Land: 14.18 sq mi (36.73 km^{2})
  - Water: 0.36 sq mi (0.92 km^{2})
- Elevation: 827 ft (252 m)

Population (2020)
  - Total: 1,515 ▼
  - Estimate (2021): 1,487
  - Density: 113.4/sq mi (43.78/km^{2})
- Time zone: UTC-5 (Eastern (EST))
  - Summer (DST): UTC-4 (EDT)
- ZIP Codes: 14894 (Wellsburg); 14861 (Lowman); 14901 (Elmira)
- FIPS code: 36-02781
- GNIS feature ID: 0978691
- Website: ashlandnychemung.gov

Ashland is a town in Chemung County, New York, United States. The population was 1,515 at the 2020 census. The town is named after the home of Henry Clay.

Ashland is on the southern border of the county, south of Elmira. It is part of the Elmira Metropolitan Statistical Area.

== History ==
In 1779, the Battle of Newtown, a consequence of the Sullivan Expedition, was fought in the north part of the town.

The first settlers arrived circa 1788. The town of Ashland was formed in 1867 from parts of the towns of Chemung, Elmira and Southport. The founders of the town wanted to name it after a prominent citizen, R.C. Lockwood, but he suggested the name "Ashland". Ashland was the last town created in Chemung County.

Growing and shipping tobacco was a popular endeavor after 1858.

== Geography ==
According to the United States Census Bureau, the town has a total area of 14.6 square miles (37.7 km^{2}), of which 14.2 square miles (36.7 km^{2}) is land and 0.35 square miles (0.9 km^{2}), or 2.44%, is water.

The Chemung River, a tributary of the Susquehanna River, flows through the town. The southern town line of Ashland is the border of Pennsylvania.

Interstate 86/New York State Route 17, New York State Route 14, and New York State Route 427 are highways in the town. New York State Route 367 is a short state highway near Wellsburg.

== Demographics ==
Historical population
Census	Pop.	Note	%±
1870	1,558		—
1880	1,149		−26.3%
1890	983		−14.4%
1900	954		−3.0%
1910	769		−19.4%
1920	834		8.5%
1930	948		13.7%
1940	951		0.3%
1950	1,188		24.9%
1960	1,273		7.2%
1970	1,726		35.6%
1980	1,967		14.0%
1990	1,966		−0.1%
2000	1,951		−0.8%
2010	1,695		−13.1%
2020	1,515		−10.6%
2021 (est.)	1,487		−1.8%
U.S. Decennial Census

As of the census of 2000, there were 1,951 people, 785 households, and 518 families residing in the town. The population density was 138.0 inhabitants per square mile (53.3/km^{2}). There were 839 housing units at an average density of 59.3 per square mile (22.9/km^{2}). The racial makeup of the town was 98.51% White, 0.36% African American, 0.21% Native American, 0.10% Asian, 0.10% from other races, and 0.72% from two or more races. Hispanic or Latino of any race were 0.62% of the population.

There were 785 households, out of which 28.2% had children under the age of 18 living with them, 51.7% were married couples living together, 8.5% had a female householder with no husband present, and 34.0% were non-families. 26.5% of all households were made up of individuals, and 12.9% had someone living alone who was 65 years of age or older. The average household size was 2.48 and the average family size was 3.01.

In the town, the population was spread out, with 24.9% under the age of 18, 6.9% from 18 to 24, 27.0% from 25 to 44, 24.7% from 45 to 64, and 16.6% who were 65 years of age or older. The median age was 40 years. For every 100 females, there were 103.0 males. For every 100 females age 18 and over, there were 100.0 males.

The median income for a household in the town was $33,629, and the median income for a family was $40,882. Males had a median income of $32,012 versus $21,553 for females. The per capita income for the town was $17,749. About 8.7% of families and 11.2% of the population were below the poverty line, including 14.3% of those under age 18 and 4.7% of those age 65 or over.

== Communities and locations in the town of Ashland ==
- Baldwin Island – An island in the Chemung River north of Wellsburg.
- Big Island – An island in the Chemung River northwest of Baldwin Island.
- Comfort Hill – A prominent hill on the western side of the town.
- Lowman – A hamlet, partly in the town, north of the Chemung River on I-86/NY 17 at exit 57 (County Roads 2, 8 and 60).
- Newtown Battlefield Reservation – The site of the Battle of Newtown is in the northern part of the town by the Chemung River.
- Wellsburg – The village of Wellsburg is near the Pennsylvania border. It is named after early settler, Abner Wells.
