= Wilcox Octagon House =

Historic house in New York, United States

- U.S. National Register of Historic Places
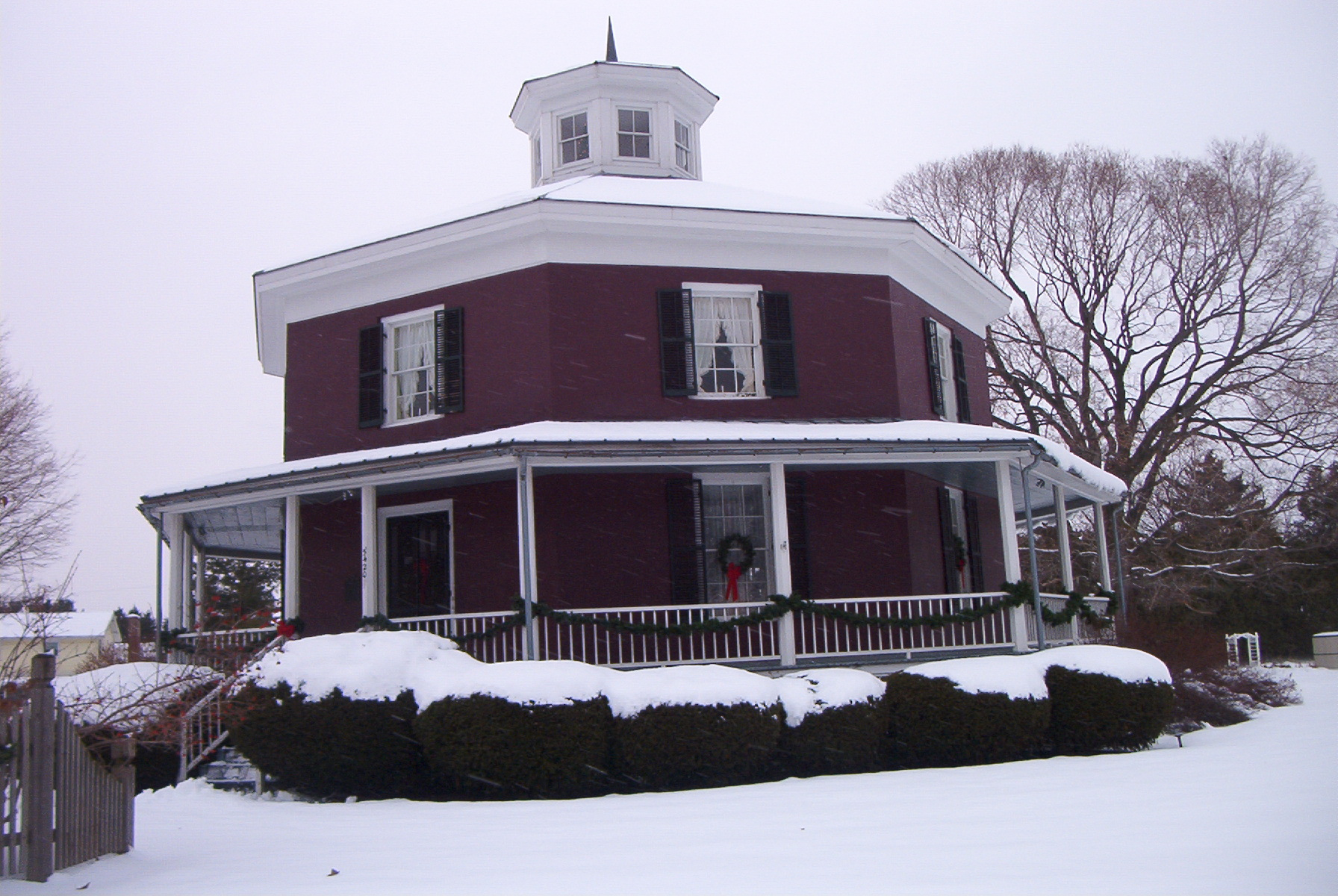
- Wilcox Octagon House

- Location within New York Location within the United States
- Interactive map showing the location of Wilcox Octagon House
- Location: 5420 W. Genesee St., Camillus, New York
- Coordinates: 43°2′28.38″N 76°16′42.06″W
- Built: 1856
- Architectural style: Octagon Mode
- NRHP reference No.: 83001756
- Added to NRHP: July 28, 1983

The Wilcox Octagon House is a historic home in Camillus, New York, USA, that was built in 1856 and was listed on the National Register of Historic Places in 1983. It was the farmhouse home of Isaiah Wilcox, who had a 40-acre (160,000 m^{2}) farm. It is an octagon house of the type advocated by Orson Fowler, who wrote an influential book promoting use of octagonal home designs.

The Orchard Village neighborhood now occupies the majority of the old farm's land; the house remains on a plot of less than 1-acre (4,000 m^{2}).

It is located at 5420 West Genesee Street in Camillus.

== Photos ==
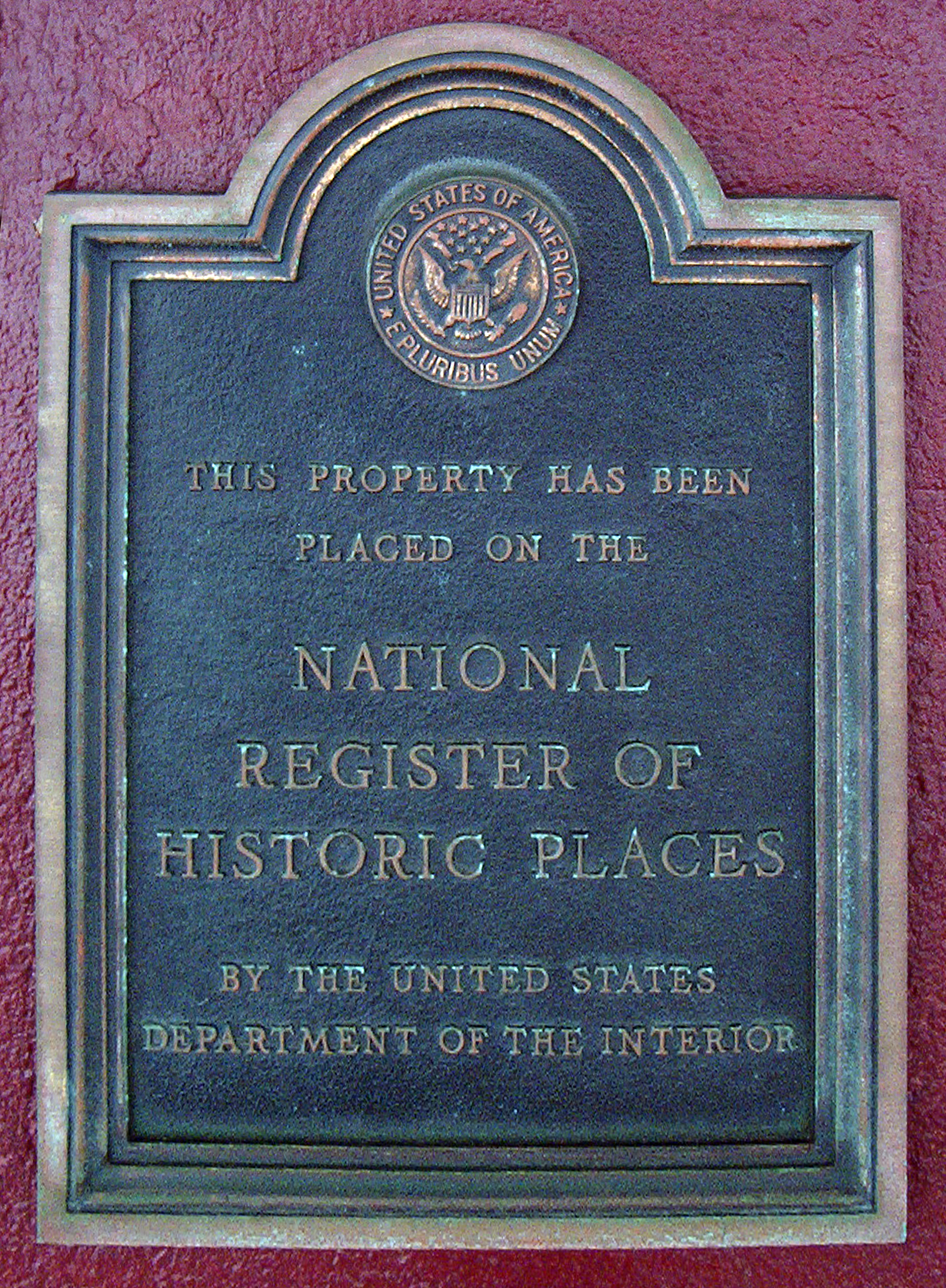
National Historic Register plaque, on Wilcox Octagon House

== See also ==
- List of Registered Historic Places in Onondaga County, New York
- Octagon House (disambiguation)
