= New York State Route 367 =

State highway in Chemung County, New York, US

New York State Route 367
- Map of southern Chemung County with NY 367 highlighted in red

Route information
- Maintained by NYSDOT
- Length: 1.07 mi (1.72 km)
- Existed: 1930–present

Major junctions
- South end: Berwick Turnpike at the Pennsylvania state line in Wellsburg
- North end: NY 427 in Wellsburg

Location
- Country: United States
- State: New York
- Counties: Chemung

Highway system
- New York Highways; Interstate; US; State; Reference; Parkways
← NY 366	→ NY 368

New York State Route 367 (NY 367) is a state highway located entirely within the village of Wellsburg in Chemung County, New York, in the United States. It is one of the shortest state routes in New York, extending for just 1.07 miles (1.72 km) from the Pennsylvania state line south of the village center to an intersection with NY 427 just north of it. The route serves as the main street of Wellsburg in both function and name. There is no corresponding signed state route on the Pennsylvania side of the border; instead, the road becomes State Route 4013 (SR 4013), one of Pennsylvania's unsigned quadrant routes. NY 367 originally extended north to Lowman when it was assigned as part of the 1930 renumbering of state highways in New York. It was truncated to its current length in 1949.

== Route description ==
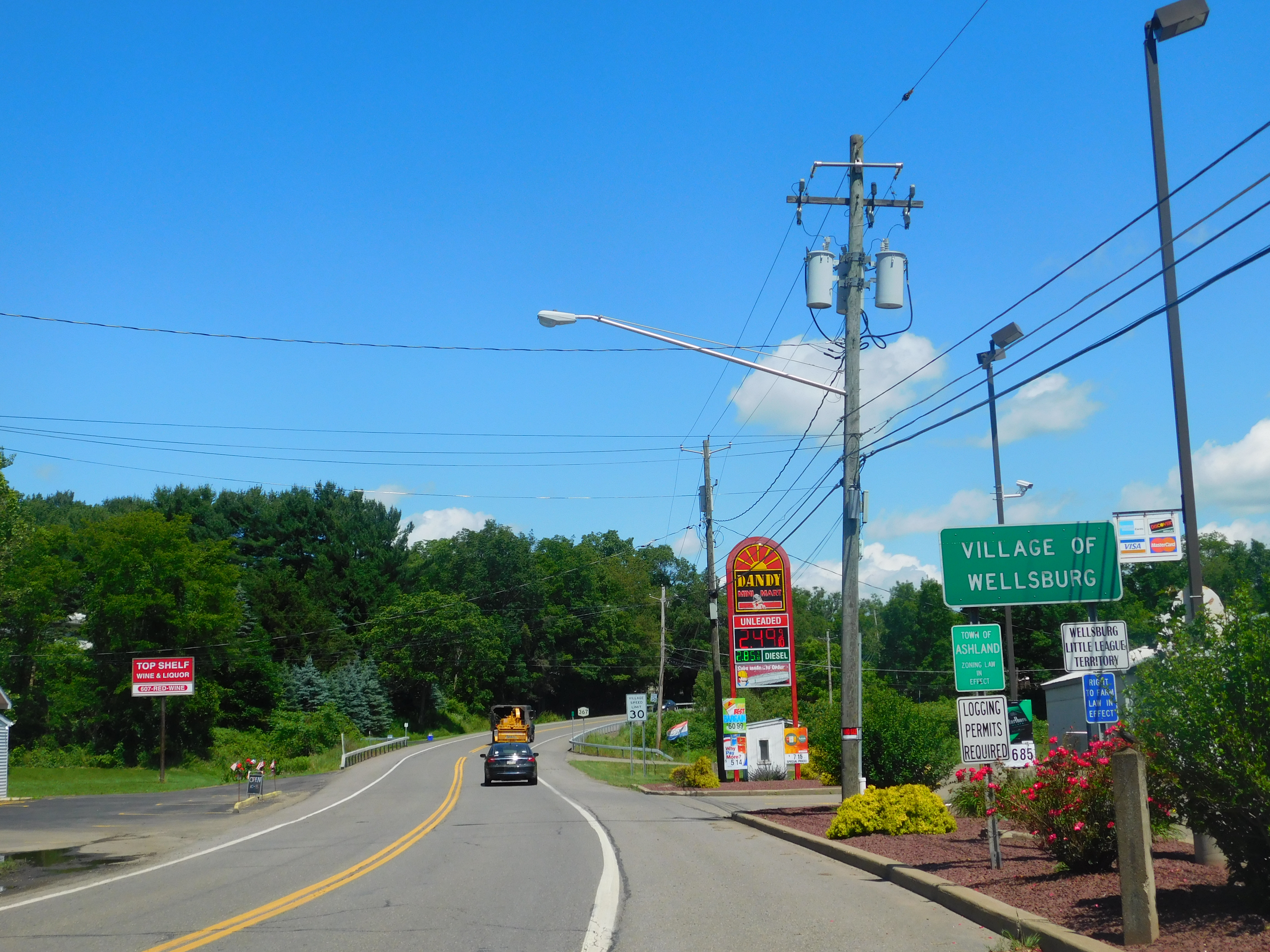
NY 367 at the Pennsylvania–New York state line

NY 367 begins at the Pennsylvania state line at Wellsburg, where the route connects to Berwick Turnpike, a highway designated but not signed as SR 4013, one of Pennsylvania's quadrant routes. The route heads north from the state line as Main Street, proceeding north through the southern portion of the village and intersecting a local street named Doty Hill Road. Not far to the north, Berwick Turnpike leaves to the northwest while NY 367 makes a slight turn to the northeast.

The route continues on, crossing over Bentley Creek and entering the central district of the village of Wellsburg, where the majority of east–west streets are numbered. Here, NY 367 serves Ashland Town Hall at the intersection of Main and 6th streets and the Wellsburg Village Centre on 5th Street. NY 367 proceeds north past five more blocks of homes and businesses before ending at a junction with NY 427 (Front Street) just south of the Chemung River.

== History ==
The north–south highway connecting Wellsburg to the Pennsylvania state line was taken over by the state of New York in the mid-1920s. It did not have a posted route number until the 1930 renumbering of state highways in New York when it became the southern half of NY 367, a new route extending from the Pennsylvania state line at Wellsburg to NY 17 (now County Route 60 or CR 60) in the hamlet of Lowman. The route continued north from Wellsburg to Lowman by way of a short piece of NY 17D (later NY 427) and Lowman Crossover. NY 367 was truncated to its current northern terminus at NY 427 in Wellsburg on January 1, 1949. The connector over the Chemung River between Wellsburg and Lowman is now maintained by Chemung County as CR 8.

== Major intersections ==
The entire route is in Wellsburg, Chemung County.

mi	km	Destinations	Notes
0.00	0.00	Berwick Turnpike (SR 4013)	Continuation into Pennsylvania
1.07	1.72	NY 427 to NY 17	Northern terminus
1.000 mi = 1.609 km; 1.000 km = 0.621 mi

== See also ==
- List of county routes in Chemung County, New York
