= Nine Mile Creek Aqueduct =

- U.S. National Register of Historic Places
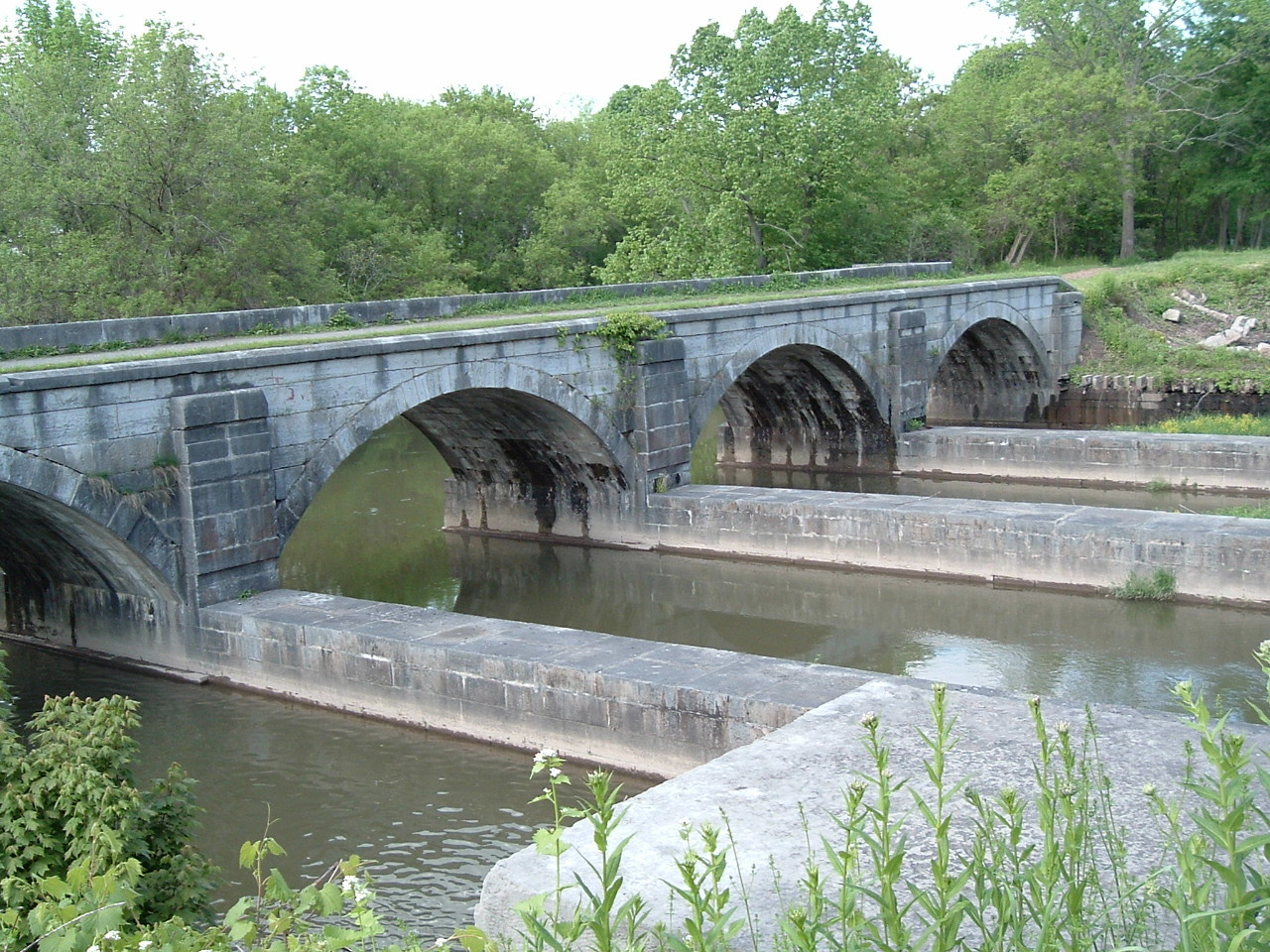
- Nine Mile Creek running beneath aqueduct, prior to its 2009 restoration

- Location within New York Location within the United States
- Nearest city: Camillus, New York
- Coordinates: 43°3′31.94″N 76°17′9.46″W
- Area: 1 acre (0.40 ha)
- Built: 1841
- Architect: Frederick C. Mills
- NRHP reference No.: 76001256
- Added to NRHP: May 17, 1976

Nine Mile Creek Aqueduct is a restored stone and wood aqueduct of the Erie Canal over Nine Mile Creek in Camillus, New York, United States. It was built in 1841 and was listed on the National Register of Historic Places in 1976.

The towpath part of the structure has four arches of 30 feet (9.1 m) each. The structure was built of stone joined by a marine cement that was relatively new at the time, but which has endured well.

The aqueduct is within the Camillus Erie Canal Park. Restoration work began in 2008 on the wooden bottom and sides of the aqueduct, enabling it to carry water again, and enabling reconnection of the two one-mile (1.6 km) segments of the Erie Canal on either side.

In August 2009, boats traversed the restored aqueduct for the first time since 1917.

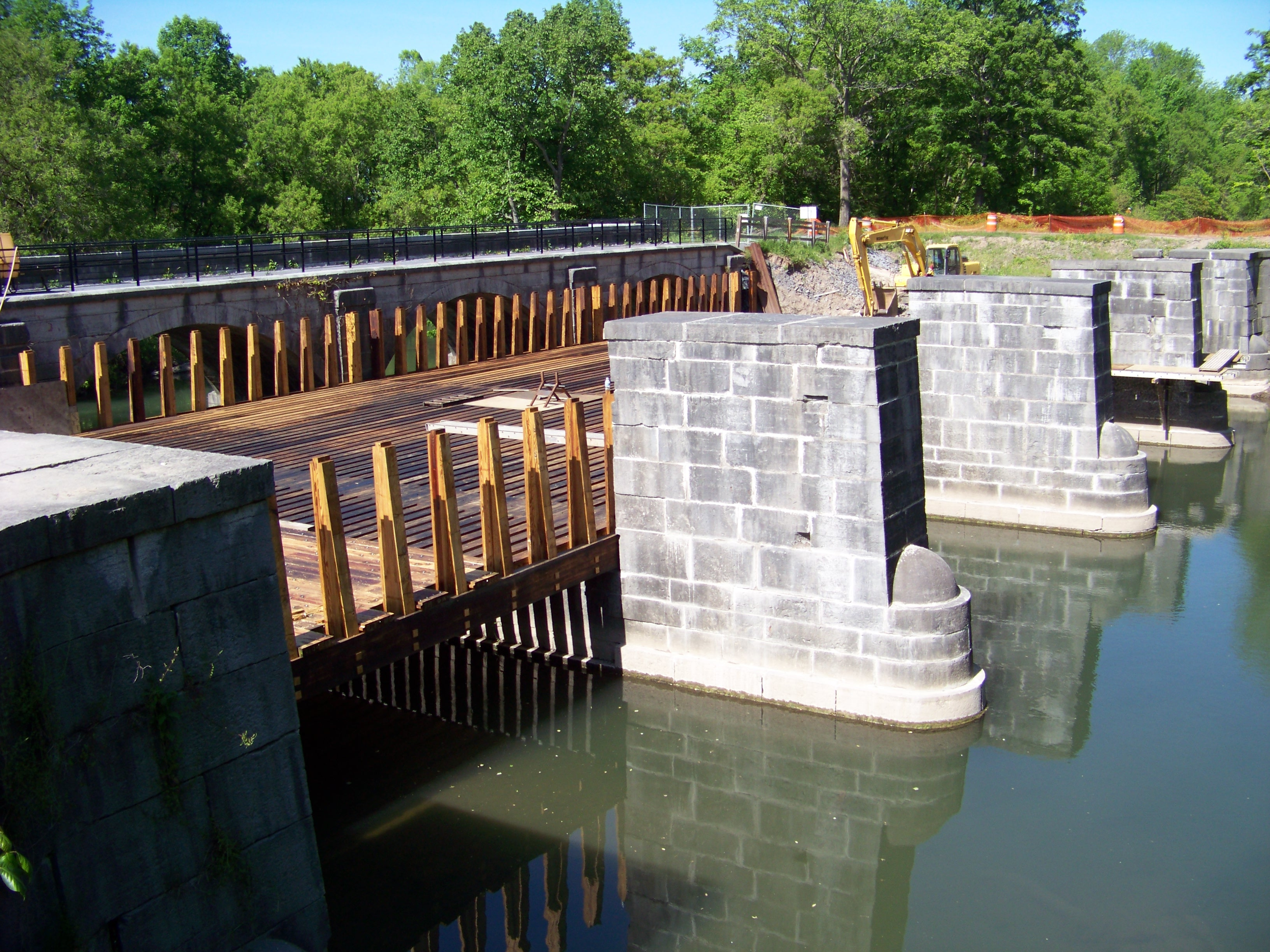
Progress of restoration as of May 25, 2009

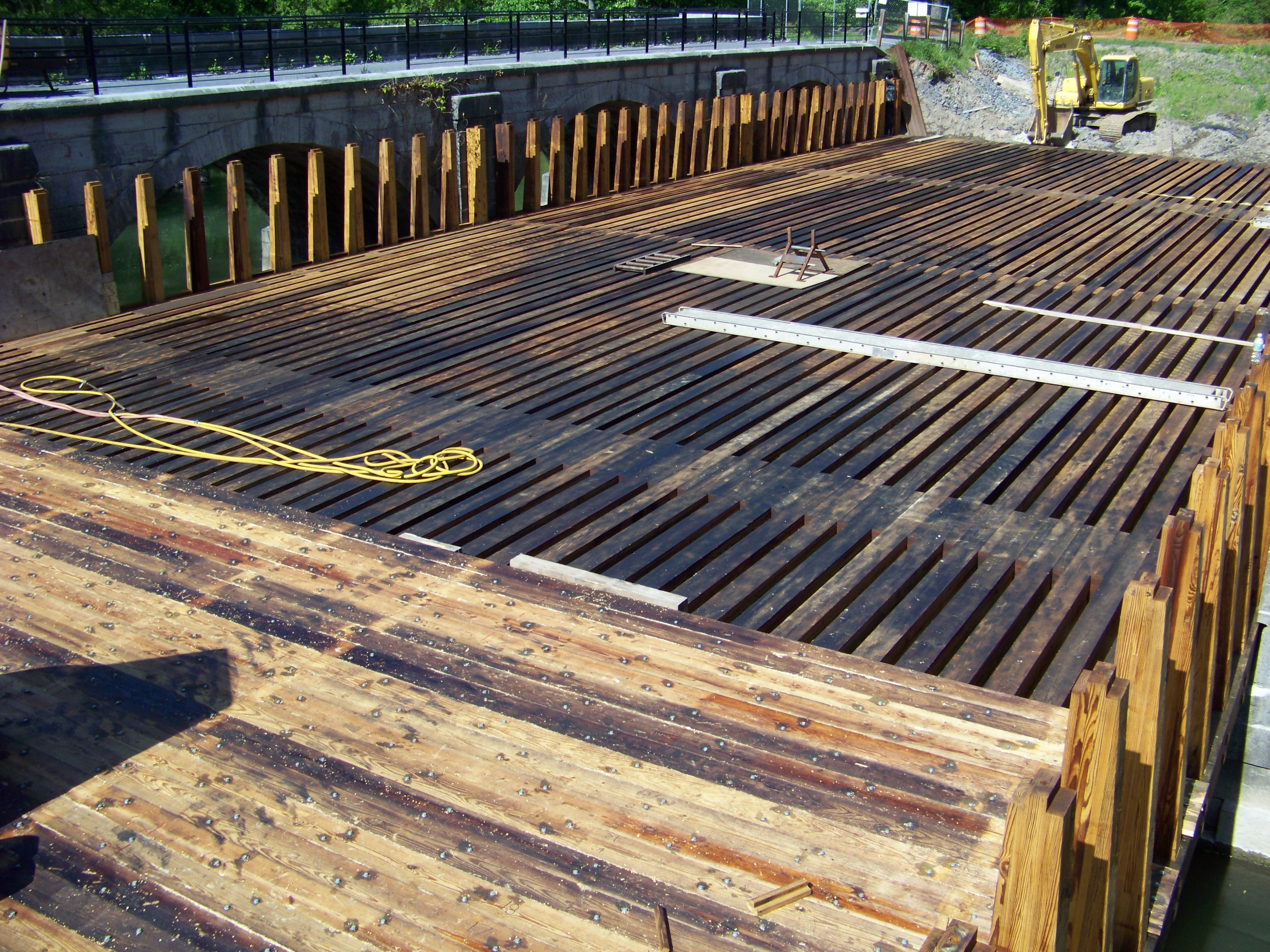
Timbering

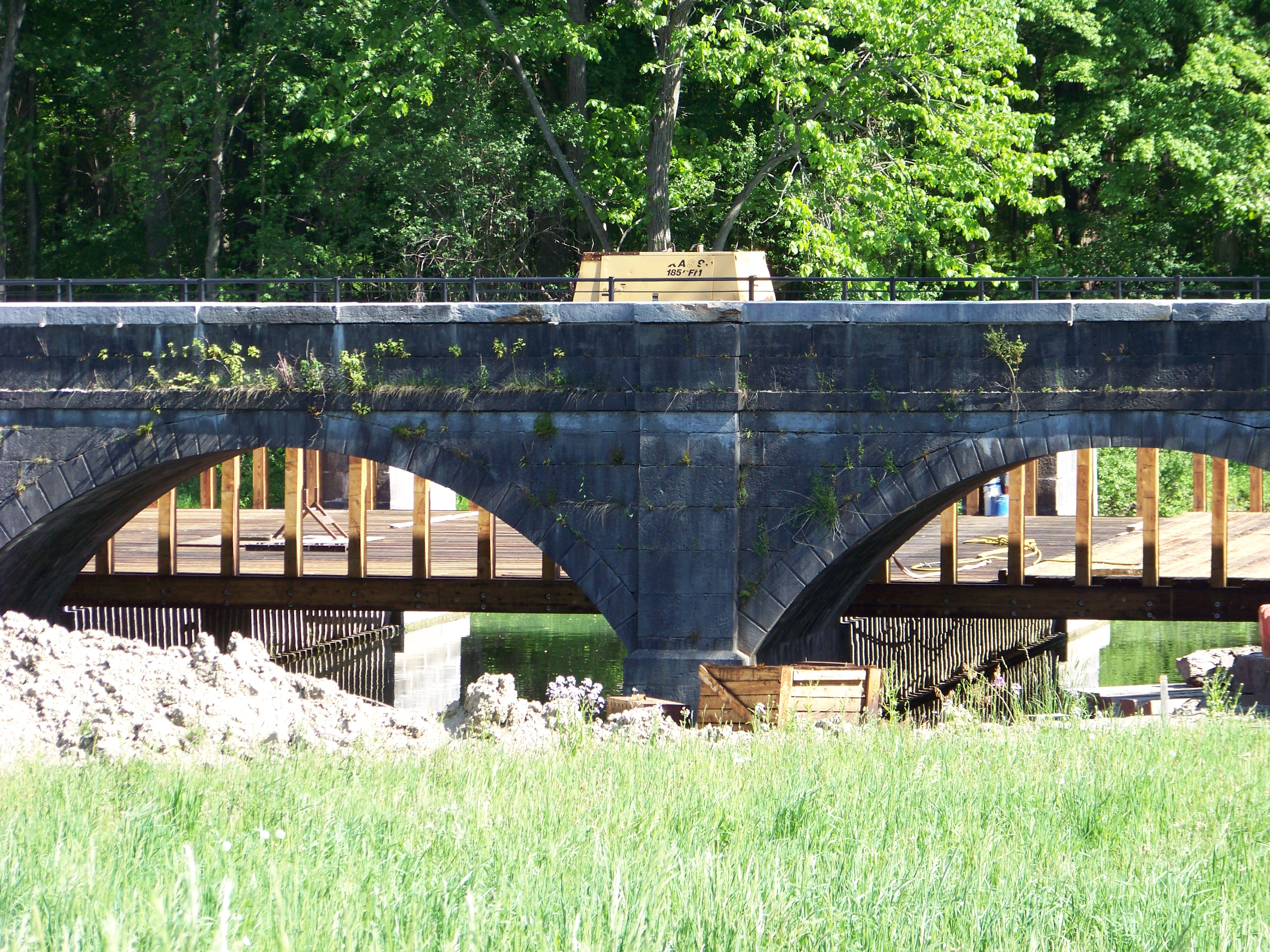
Through the towpath archways

It is located off Thompson Road in Camillus, about one mile east from Sim's Store. It is a few hundred yards' walking distance from a small parking area on Thompson Road.
