= Fayette S. Munro =

American politician

Fayette Smith Munro (June 8, 1874 – January 19, 1921) was an American lawyer and politician.

Munro was born in Camillus, New York. He graduated from Colgate University in 1895 and from Harvard Law School in 1898. He moved to Chicago, Illinois in 1899 and was admitted to the Illinois bar in 1900. He lived in Highland Park, Illinois with his wife and family. Munro served on the Highland Park School Board for four years. He served in the Illinois House of Representatives from 1913 to 1915 and was a member of the Progressive Party. In 1916, Munro ran for the Republican nomination for the office of the Illinois Attorney General and lost the nomination to Edward J. Brundage. He died from anemia at his home in Highland Park, Illinois.
