= New York State Route 427 =

East–west state highway in Chemung County, New York

New York State Route 427
- Map of the Elmira area with NY 427 highlighted in red and NY 961B in blue

Route information
- Maintained by NYSDOT
- Length: 11.49 mi (18.49 km)
- Existed: early 1940s–present

Major junctions
- West end: NY 14 in Southport
- East end: I-86 / NY 17 / Southern Tier Expressway in Chemung

Location
- Country: United States
- State: New York
- Counties: Chemung

Highway system
- New York Highways; Interstate; US; State; Reference; Parkways
← NY 426	→ NY 428
← NY 17C	NY 17D	→ NY 17E
← NY 378	NY 379	→ NY 380

New York State Route 427 (NY 427) is an east–west state highway in Chemung County, New York. It extends for 11.5 miles (18.5 km) from its western terminus at an intersection with NY 14 in the town of Southport, south of the city of Elmira, to its eastern terminus at an interchange with I-86/NY 17 in the town of Chemung. Between those two towns, the highway passes through the town of Ashland and serves the village of Wellsburg. Much of NY 427 follows the Chemung River.

The route number 427 was assigned in the early 1940s, and replaced the ennumeration New York State Route 17D. Route 17D was established as part of the 1930 renumbering of state highways in New York. It originally began in downtown Elmira and ended at the Pennsylvania state line in Chemung. NY 427 was realigned on its east end in 1967 to meet the newly constructed exit 59 on NY 17 and on its west end in 1978 to follow what had been New York State Route 379 through the town of Southport. Other minor realignments occurred during the route's history.

== Route description ==
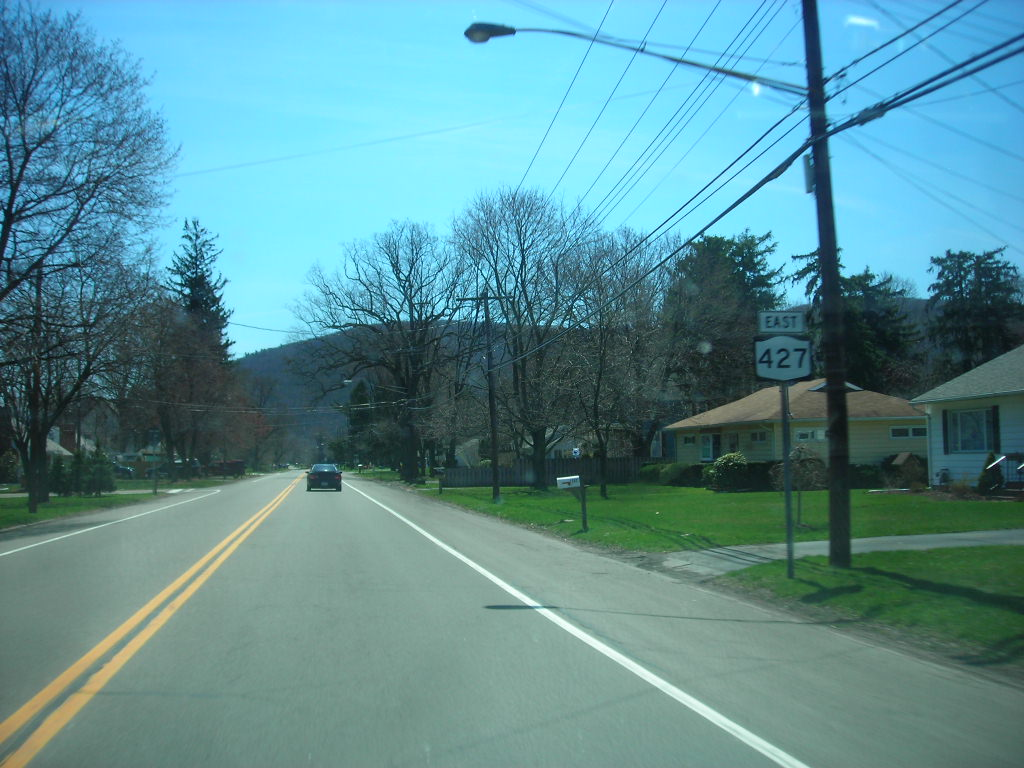
Eastbound on NY 427 just south of Cedar Street in Southport

NY 427 begins at an intersection with NY 14 (the Clemens Center Parkway) in Southport (Southport is located south of the city of Elmira.) It heads east, following Cedar Street and paralleling Seeley Creek through the southern suburbs of Elmira to an intersection with Maple Avenue near Notre Dame High School. Here, NY 427 turns south to follow Maple Avenue into the adjacent town of Ashland and across Seeley Creek.

As the route heads through Ashland, it turns to the southeast to match the curvature of the Chemung River valley. The valley contains the river, NY 427, and the Southern Tier Expressway (NY 17). NY 427 follows the river and the expressway into Wellsburg. Wellsburg is a small village sandwiched between the Chemung River and the Pennsylvania state line. In the center of the village, NY 427, named Front Street, intersects with the northern end of NY 367, a short highway linking NY 427 to the Pennsylvania border. Just east of NY 367, NY 427 intersects County Route 8 (CR 8). CR 8 crosses the Chemung River and links Wellsburg to NY 17 at exit 58.

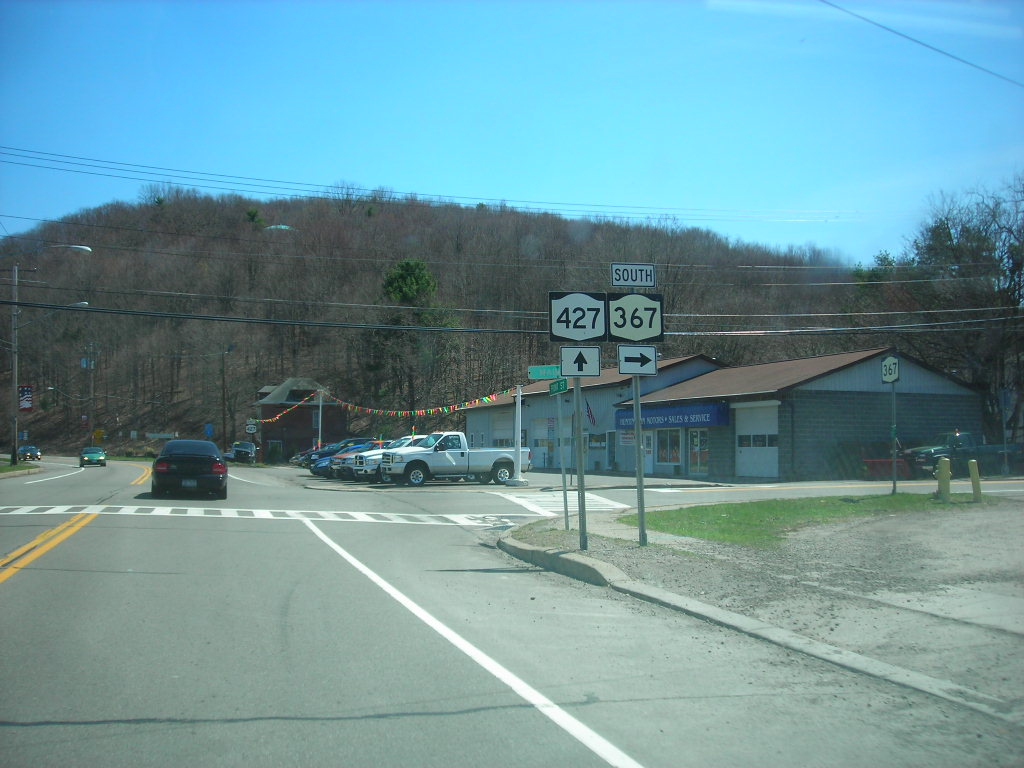
Eastbound on NY 427 at NY 367 in Wellsburg

Outside of Wellsburg, NY 427 becomes Wilawana Road and heads eastward, and parallels the Chemung River and the Norfolk Southern Railway-owned Southern Tier Line through the town of Chemung toward the Pennsylvania state line. Less than 300 yards (270 m) from the Pennsylvania border, NY 427 departs Wilawana Road and turns northeast onto Wyncoop Creek Road. Wilawana Road from here to the border is unsigned NY 961B. NY 427 crosses the Chemung River before coming to an end at an interchange with NY 17 0.5 miles (0.8 km) later. Although NY 427 comes to an end at this interchange, the road continues onward through the interchange as NY 961A; NY 961A is an unsigned reference route.

== History ==
=== Origins and designation ===
Most of what is now NY 427 was originally designated as NY 17D in the 1930 renumbering. NY 17D began at the intersection of East Water Street (NY 17) and Madison Avenue (NY 14 and NY 17) in downtown Elmira. NY 17D headed west, overlapping NY 14 along Water Street to Lake Street, where NY 17D turned south and followed Lake Street and Pennsylvania Avenue over the Chemung River to Maple Avenue. Here, NY 17D turned to the southeast to follow Maple Avenue through southern Elmira. At Cedar Street, NY 17D joined the modern alignment of NY 427. From this point east, NY 17D followed what is now NY 427 to Wyncoop Creek Road in Chemung. From Wyncoop Creek it continued on Wilawana Road to the Pennsylvania border.

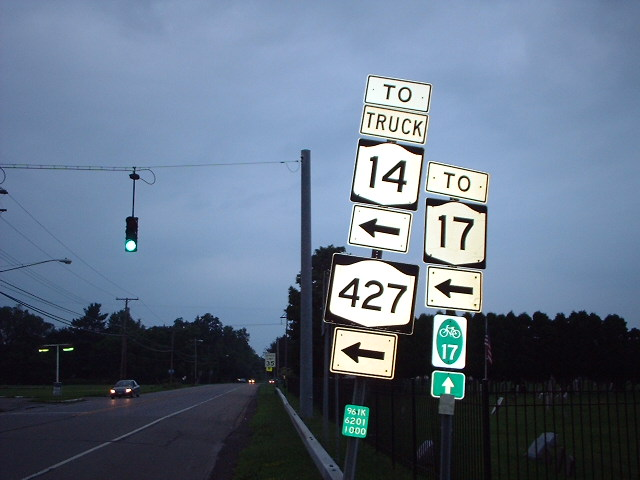
2004 photo of signage at the intersection of Cedar Street and Maple Avenue in Southport. Until 1978, NY 427 continued straight and NY 379 began to the left.

In the months immediately following the 1930 renumbering, NY 14 was routed on Pennsylvania Avenue and South Main Street through southern Elmira. By 1935, NY 14 was rerouted to follow Pennsylvania Avenue into downtown. As a result, all of NY 17D north of the junction of Pennsylvania and Maple avenues became concurrent with NY 14. The overlap was eliminated in the early 1940s when NY 17D was pulled back to the intersection of Pennsylvania and Maple avenues and renumbered as NY 427.

=== Realignments ===
The 1930s-era realignment of NY 14 was reverted in c. 1961 as the route was reconfigured to follow South Main Street into downtown Elmira. NY 427 was extended northward along Pennsylvania Avenue to a new terminus at Water Street (NY 14 and NY 17E; later NY 352) as part of the change. At the other end of the route, the easternmost part of NY 427 was realigned c. 1967 to follow Wyncoop Creek Road to a new interchange (exit 59) with the Southern Tier Expressway (NY 17) in Chemung. The former routing of NY 427 along Wilawana Road between Wyncoop Creek Road and the Pennsylvania state line was designated as NY 961B. NY 961B is an unsigned reference route like NY 961A.

On October 23, 1978, NY 427 was rerouted to bypass Elmira entirely. Instead of continuing north into downtown, NY 427 turned west at Cedar Street and followed it through Southport to a new terminus at Pennsylvania Avenue (NY 14). The realignment of NY 427 through Southport supplanted NY 379; the route had been assigned to the portion of Cedar Street between Pennsylvania and Maple avenues since c. 1931. NY 427's former alignment along Maple Avenue from Cedar Street north to the Elmira city line was redesignated as NY 961K. Although this part of Maple Avenue is still listed as a state highway in the New York State Highway Law, NY 961K ceased to exist at some point between 2004 and 2006 and the road is now maintained by Chemung County and designated as CR 85.

The Clemens Center Parkway was completed c. 2002, and created a continuous four-lane arterial between Southport and the northernmost part of Elmira. South of downtown Elmira, the highway loosely paralleled Pennsylvania Avenue and South Main Street. NY 14 was realigned c. 2004 to follow all but the northernmost part of the parkway, and the west end of NY 427 was shifted 0.25 miles (0.40 km) east to Cedar Street's junction with the parkway as part of the change. The portion of Cedar Street between Pennsylvania Avenue and NY 14 is now CR 84.

== Major intersections ==
The entire route is in Chemung County.

Location	mi	km	Destinations	Notes
Southport	0.00	0.00	NY 14	Western terminus; community of Southport
Southport	1.17	1.88	CR 85 (Maple Avenue)	Former routing of NY 427; formerly unsigned NY 961K
Wellsburg	5.49	8.84	NY 367 south	Northern terminus of NY 367
Chemung	11.15	17.94	Wilawana Road ( NY 961B) – Athens	Northern terminus of unsigned NY 961B; former routing of NY 427
Chemung	11.49	18.49	I-86 / NY 17 / Southern Tier Expressway – Waverly, Binghamton, Elmira	Eastern terminus, exit 59 (I-86 / NY 17); diamond interchange
Chemung	11.49	18.49	Wyncoop Creek Road ( NY 961A)	Continuation past I-86 / NY 17; western terminus of unsigned NY 961A
1.000 mi = 1.609 km; 1.000 km = 0.621 mi

== See also ==
- List of county routes in Chemung County, New York
