= Elbridge Village Historic District =

Historic district in New York, United States

- U.S. National Register of Historic Places
- U.S. Historic district
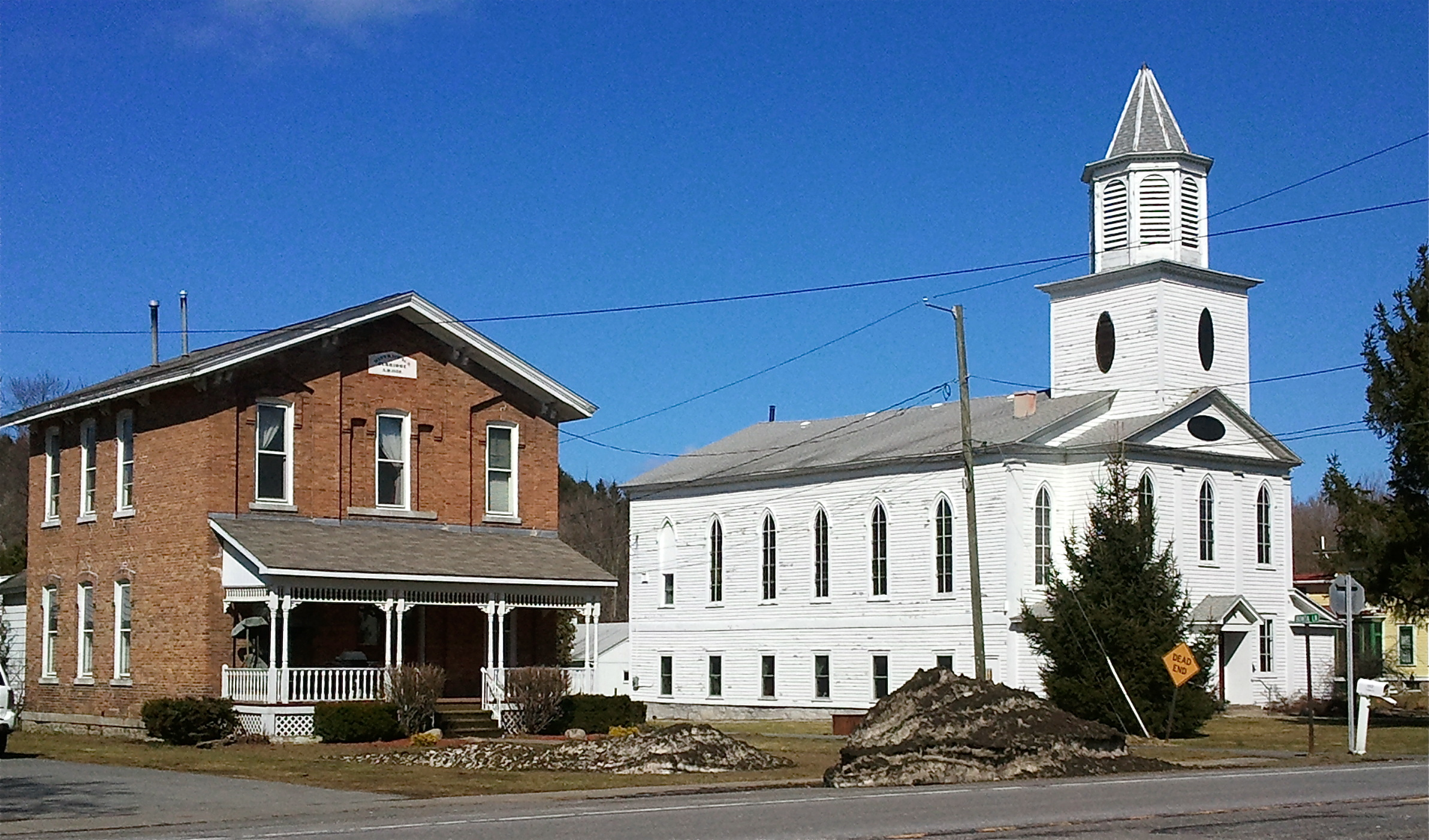

- Location within New York Location within the United States
- Location: Roughly along NY 5 bet. Skaneatetes Creek and Carpenter's Brook, Elbridge, New York
- Coordinates: 43°2′6″N 76°26′49″W
- Area: 60 acres (24 ha)
- Architect: White, Horatio Nelson; Park, Charles
- Architectural style: Federal, Greek Revival
- NRHP reference No.: 01001494
- Added to NRHP: January 24, 2002

The Elbridge Village Historic District is a 60 acres (24 ha) historic district in the town of Elbridge, New York. It includes 66 contributing buildings and 26 contributing objects.

Most of the contributing buildings are along Route 5. Federal and Greek Revival architectural styles are represented.

Contributing objects include items such as a carriage entry staircase.

The Town of Elbridge has an estimated population of 6,000 people and an approximate size of 36 square miles.
