= Camillus, New York =

Town in New York, United States

- Town
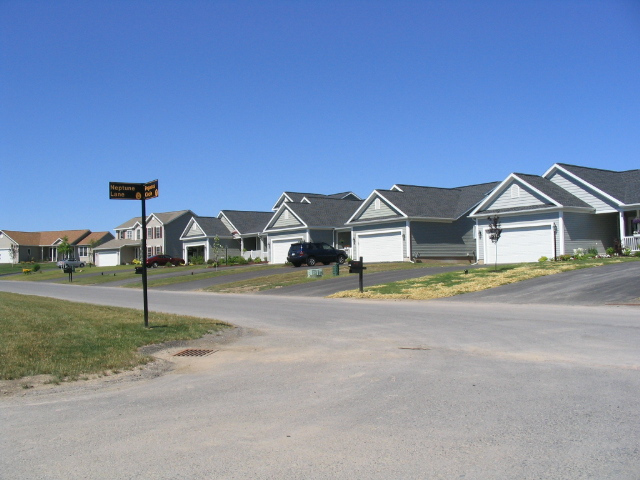
- Patio homes and single family houses in Camillus in 2007

- Logo

- Location in Onondaga County and the state of New York.
- Coordinates: 43°02′33″N 76°15′39″W
- Country: United States
- State: New York
- County: Onondaga

Government
  - Type: Town Council
  - Town Supervisor: John Fatcheric (R)
  - Town Council: Members: • W1: David Philippone (D); • W2: Mark Kolinski (D); • W3: William E. Davern (R); • W4: James F. Salanger (D); • W5: Richard R. Griffo (D); • W6: David J. Callahan (R)

Area
  - Total: 34.44 sq mi (89.20 km^{2})
  - Land: 34.42 sq mi (89.16 km^{2})
  - Water: 0.015 sq mi (0.04 km^{2})

Population (2020)
  - Total: 25,346
  - Density: 736.3/sq mi (284.3/km^{2})
- Time zone: UTC-5 (Eastern (EST))
  - Summer (DST): UTC-4 (EDT)
- ZIP codes: 13031 (Camillus); 13060 (Elbridge); 13108 (Marcellus); 13112 (Memphis); 13164 (Warners); 13209, 13219 (Syracuse)
- Area code: 315
- Website: townofcamillus.com

Camillus is a town in Onondaga County, New York, United States. As of the 2020 Census, the population was 25,346.

The Town of Camillus is west of Syracuse. There is also a village named Camillus in the town. Much of the town is a western suburb of Syracuse.

== Geography ==
According to the United States Census Bureau, the town has a total area of 34.5 square miles (89.3 km^{2}), all land.

New York State Route 5 is an east-west highway across the town. New York State Route 173 intersects NY-5 near Fairmount. New York State Route 174 intersect NY-5 near Camillus village. New York State Route 321 intersects NY-5 at Bennetts Corners. New York State Route 695 and New York State Route 297 are state highways near the east town line.

== History ==
Most of the current-day Town of Camillus was part of the former Central New York Military Tract. Much of the southeastern portion of the town, corresponding to Fairmount, was not part of the Military Tract but was instead part of the original Onondaga Reservation territory that came under New York State control after the Treaty of Cayuga Bridge in 1795. This part of the town, originally incorporated into the Town of Onondaga, was annexed to Camillus in 1834. Joseph Sherwood, the first pioneer arrived around 1795 at the site of the village of Camillus. The Town of Camillus was formed in 1799 with land from the Town of Marcellus. Industrial development was promoted by the Erie Canal in 1825. Camillus was also on the railroad line linking Syracuse to Auburn in 1838. The Nine Mile Creek Aqueduct and Wilcox Octagon House are listed on the National Register of Historic Places.

Camillus gained national and worldwide attention in 2018 when a resident, Michael Rotondo, a 30-year-old man, was evicted from his parents home after they sued his son. Credited by Alex Jones, his parents offered him $1,100 to stay but an offer by a pizza chain Villa Italian Kitchen gave him an offer of $1,101 as a signing bonus.

== Demographics ==
Historical population
Census	Pop.	Note	%±
1820	5,791		—
1830	2,518		−56.5%
1840	3,957		57.1%
1850	3,105		−21.5%
1860	2,940		−5.3%
1870	2,423		−17.6%
1880	2,416		−0.3%
1890	2,678		10.8%
1900	2,453		−8.4%
1910	2,642		7.7%
1920	2,905		10.0%
1930	4,066		40.0%
1940	4,394		8.1%
1950	6,735		53.3%
1960	18,328		172.1%
1970	26,841		46.4%
1980	24,333		−9.3%
1990	23,625		−2.9%
2000	23,152		−2.0%
2010	24,167		4.4%
2020	25,346		4.9%
U.S. Decennial Census

As of the census of 2000, there were 23,152 people, 9,315 households, and 6,595 families residing in the town. The population density was 671.9 inhabitants per square mile (259.4/km^{2}). There were 9,661 housing units at an average density of 280.4 per square mile (108.3/km^{2}). The racial makeup of the town was 96.45% White, 0.95% Black or African American, 0.37% Native American, 1.10% Asian, 0.02% Pacific Islander, 0.27% from other races, and 0.84% from two or more races. Hispanic or Latino of any race were 0.92% of the population.

There were 9,315 households, out of which 30.5% had children under the age of 18 living with them, 58.1% were married couples living together, 9.8% had a female householder with no husband present, and 29.2% were non-families. 25.1% of all households were made up of individuals, and 12.0% had someone living alone who was 65 years of age or older. The average household size was 2.48 and the average family size was 2.99.

In the town, the population was spread out, with 24.2% under the age of 18, 5.8% from 18 to 24, 27.5% from 25 to 44, 24.2% from 45 to 64, and 18.3% who were 65 years of age or older. The median age was 40 years. For every 100 females, there were 91.3 males. For every 100 females age 18 and over, there were 87.3 males.

The median income for a household in the town was $50,198, and the median income for a family was $58,395. Males had a median income of $41,011 versus $29,110 for females. The per capita income for the town was $22,591. About 3.1% of families and 4.3% of the population were below the poverty line, including 5.6% of those under age 18 and 4.6% of those age 65 or over.

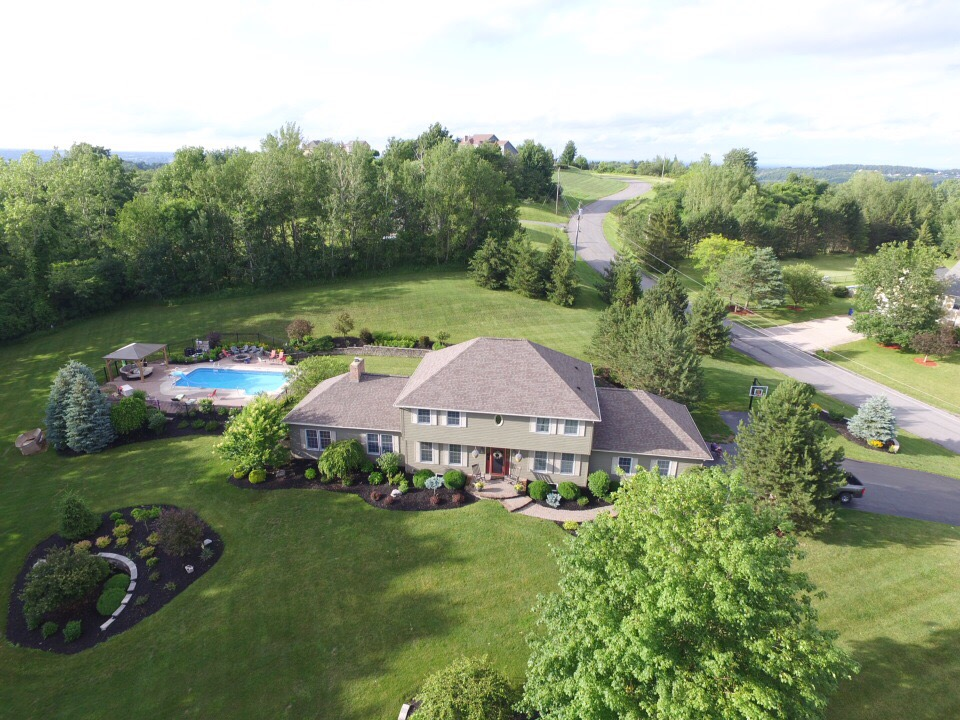
A large suburban house in the western hills of Camillus.

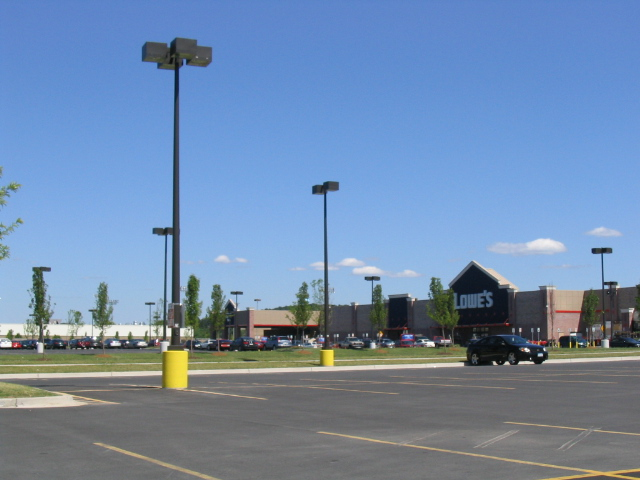
Lowe's in Camillus

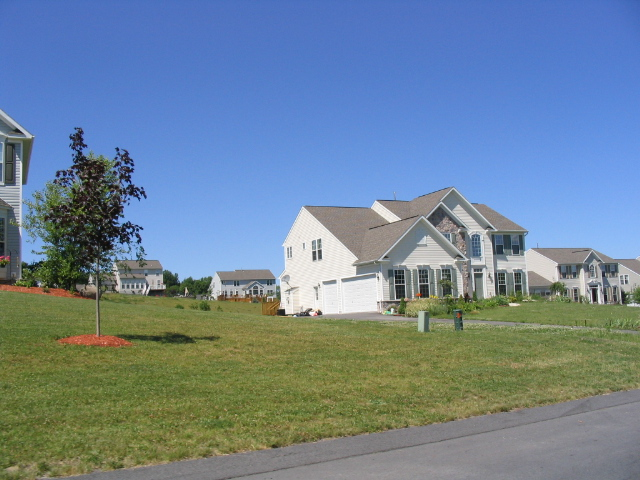
Housing development

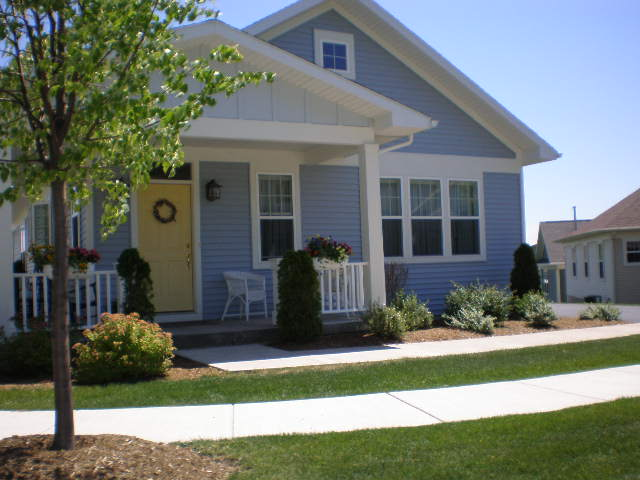
Annesgrove Traditional Neighborhood in Camillus

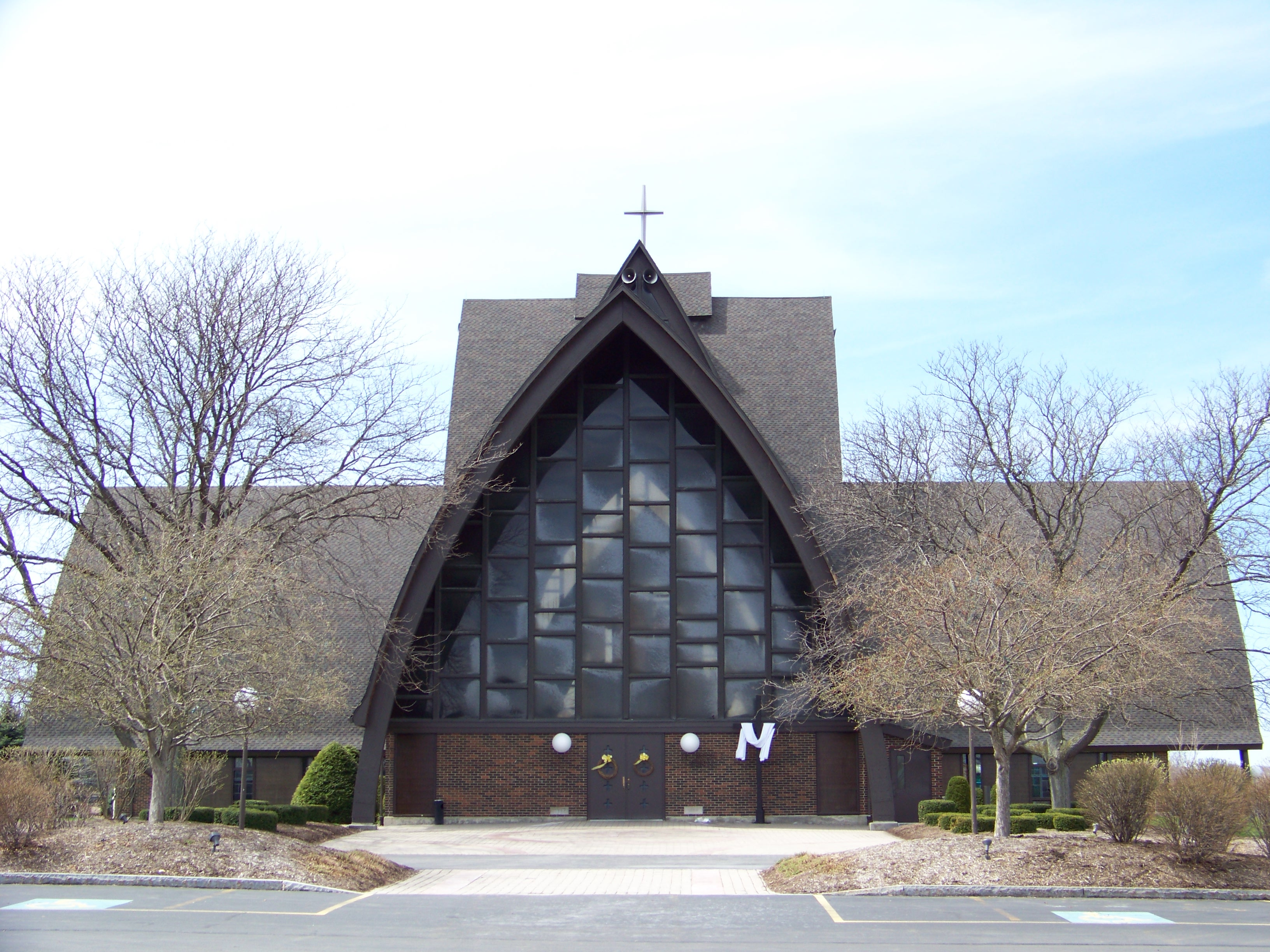
St Joseph's Catholic Church

== Communities and locations in the Town of Camillus ==
- Amboy – A hamlet in the north central part of Camillus on NY-173.
- Amboy Station – A location north of Amboy.
- Belle Isle – A location east of Amboy and adjacent to Rt. 695 and the NYS Fairgrounds.
- Bennetts Corners – A hamlet near the western town line by the junction of NY-5 and NY-321.
- Camillus – The Village of Camillus is in the southwestern part of the Town of Camillus.
- Camillus Airport (NY2) – A small general aviation airport near the northern town line, approximately one mile from the former Syracuse Municipal Airport.
- Daniluk Drive – A neighborhood near the western town line by the junction of NY-5.
- Edgewood Garden – A neighborhood near the northern town line.
- Fairmount – A hamlet near the eastern town line.
- Four Winds – A group of homes located in the Hamlet of Newport
- Fox Chapel – A neighborhood approximately five minutes from the village of Camillus.
- Garden Terrace – A neighborhood near the northern town line.
- Greenfield Village – A neighborhood adjacent to Amboy and across from Reed Webster park.
- Hidden Knolls – A neighborhood just west of Fairmount, on a hill above Shove Park.
- Memphis – A hamlet at the northern town line north of Oswego Bitters.
- Newport – A hamlet near the northern town line.
- Ninemile Creek – A Stream flowing through the western part of the town.
- North Belle Isle – A hamlet near the eastern town line.
- Orchard Village – A neighborhood near the southern town line.
- Oswego Bitters – A hamlet in the western part of the town on Bitters Road, west of Bennetts Corners Road.
- Parson Farms – A neighborhood near the southern town line.
- Pioneer Farms – A neighborhood west of the Weatheridge and Fox Chapel neighborhoods and across from the Camillus Medical Center (formerly the GTE building).
- Scenic Hills – A neighborhood on the southern town line between Kasson Road and Westvale Golf Course.
- Sherwood Knolls – A neighborhood near the southern town line.
- Stanley Manor – A neighborhood near the southern town line.
- Syracuse Municipal Airport – A former airport in the northeastern part of the town. It was an early center for aviation in the county.
- Warners – A hamlet at the northern town line, north of Newport.
- Weatheridge – A neighborhood southeast of Camillus village bordering Pioneer Farms
- Wellington – A neighborhood along NYS Route 5.
- Westerlea – A neighborhood northeast of Camillus village.
- Westview Manor – A neighborhood east of Camillus village.
- West Genesee Terrace – A neighborhood east of Camillus village.
- Wincrest Park – A neighborhood southeast of Camillus village.

== Notable people ==
- Kinsley S. Bingham, politician
- Kent Carpenter, marine scientist
- Tom Clark, Commissioner of the Professional Bowlers Association (PBA)
- Kelly Cutrone, American fashion publicist
- Frank DiPino, Major League pitcher
- Sara Virginia Ecker Watts Morrison, First Lady of North Carolina
- Kim Hill, soul musician, former member of Black Eyed Peas
- John Katko, politician
- Fayette S. Munro, politician and lawyer
- Francis Paddock, politician
- Susan Wynne, American ice dancer

== See also ==
- West Genesee High School
