= Memphis, New York =

- hamlet
- Location within the state of New York
- Coordinates: 43°5′12″N 76°22′40″W
- Country: United States
- State: New York
- County: Onondaga
- Time zone: UTC-5 (Eastern (EST))
  - Summer (DST): UTC-4 (EDT)
- ZIP code: 13112
- Area codes: 315 and 680

Map of Memphis from Sweet's 1874 Atlas of Onondaga County, N.Y.

Memphis is a hamlet in the Town of Van Buren, west of Syracuse in Onondaga County, New York, United States.

Because of its location on the southern town line of Van Buren, above the Towns of Elbridge and Camillus, the Memphis area can also be considered to extend into Elbridge and Camillus. A section of Memphis lies on Cross Lake and Seneca River.

In the early 1800s, the hamlet was named "Canton". Sometime after the 1850s, the name was changed to the current "Memphis", presumably because Canton was already established. Now the name "Canton" refers to a small community between Memphis and Camillus.

From 1825 to 1918, The Erie Canal ran through the north side of Memphis. The First Baptist Church of Memphis was also located in Memphis from 1815 to 2013.The Plainville Turkey Farm used to be in Memphis, which included a restaurant, which closed in February 2010.

The small community is spread over a wide area due to the primary use of land for farming. Well known farms include a portion of Hourigan's Farms, the Hooper Farm, and a portion of Blumer's Farms. There is also an area known by locals as "The Kingdom," named for Kingdom Road. The road follows the east side of the Seneca River, traveling from Jack's Reef to State Route 31.

Directly north of Memphis, past the hamlet of Ionia, lies a small unmarked community. Formerly called Sand Springs in the 1800s, the area is now more commonly known as Whisky Hollow. It is home to the Whiskey Hollow Nature Preserve, a rough road bridging Perry Road to West Dead Creek Road. The preserve has been relatively untouched in the past century. Within the preserve lies a natural spring, which the local community uses as a fresh source of water.
