= Elbridge, New York =

Town in New York, United States

- Town
- Seal

- Location in Onondaga County and the state of New York.

- Location of New York in the United States
- Coordinates: 43°2′12″N 76°26′36″W
- Country: United States
- State: New York
- County: Onondaga
- Territorial subdivision: 1829

Government
  - Town Supervisor: Vernon J. Richardson (R)
  - Town Council: Members: Douglas Blumer (D); Joe Farrugia (D); Mike Caron (R); Todd Platten (R)

Area
  - Total: 38.29 sq mi (99.18 km^{2})
  - Land: 37.54 sq mi (97.22 km^{2})
  - Water: 0.76 sq mi (1.96 km^{2})

Population (2020)
  - Total: 5,476
  - Density: 145.9/sq mi (56.33/km^{2})
- Time zone: UTC-5 (EST)
  - Summer (DST): UTC-4 (EDT)
- ZIP Codes: 13060 (Elbridge); 13080 (Jordan); 13112 (Memphis); 13166 (Weedsport)
- Area code: 315
- FIPS code: 36-067-23800
- Website: townofelbridge.gov

Elbridge is a town in Onondaga County, New York, United States. As of the 2020 Census, the population was 5,476. The town is named after Elbridge Gerry, the fifth Vice President of the United States, and one of the signers of the Declaration of Independence.

The Town of Elbridge is west of Syracuse, on the western border of the county. The town contains two villages, one named Jordan and one which is also named Elbridge.

== History ==
Elbridge was part of Military Township No. 5 (Camillus) created following the American Revolution and given to veterans in lieu of payment for service during the War for Independence. This tract comprised most of present-day Camillus and all of Van Buren and Marcellus in what is now the County of Onondaga in Central New York's Finger Lakes Region. The Town of Elbridge was formed in 1829 from the Town of Camillus.

The Town of Elbridge includes two incorporated villages: the Village of Elbridge (incorporated in 1848) and the Village of Jordan (incorporated in 1835).

An 1896 article from Onondaga's Centennial by Dwight H. Bruce describes the area as "a densely wooded wilderness, frequented by Indians and inhabited by bears, wolves and other beasts of the forest and could not have presented an appearance other than of gloomy waste." It can be assumed that neither the Natives nor the incoming settlers necessarily agreed with Bruce's negative assessment. Before the arrival of the white settlers, the native presence was prevalent and sustained. The Onondaga ("People of the Hill") of the Iroquois Nation had several fortified settlements in the area. The largest still exists on the Seneca River in what is now known as Jack's Reef. In fact, according to some legends, Cross Lake, which forms the northern boundary of the town, was the home of the historical Hiawatha.

In 1791, government surveyor Josiah Buck arrived to map the area. Two years later he returned with his family to become the first Anglo-European settler. Buck was followed in short order by Captain William Stevens, his wife and six children. Town historians believe it is probable that Captain Stevens named the town after Massachusetts Governor Elbridge Gerry, who participated with Stevens in the Boston Tea Party raid in 1773.

== Village of Elbridge ==
The Village of Elbridge was located on a well-traveled Indian trail that eventually became New York State Route 5.

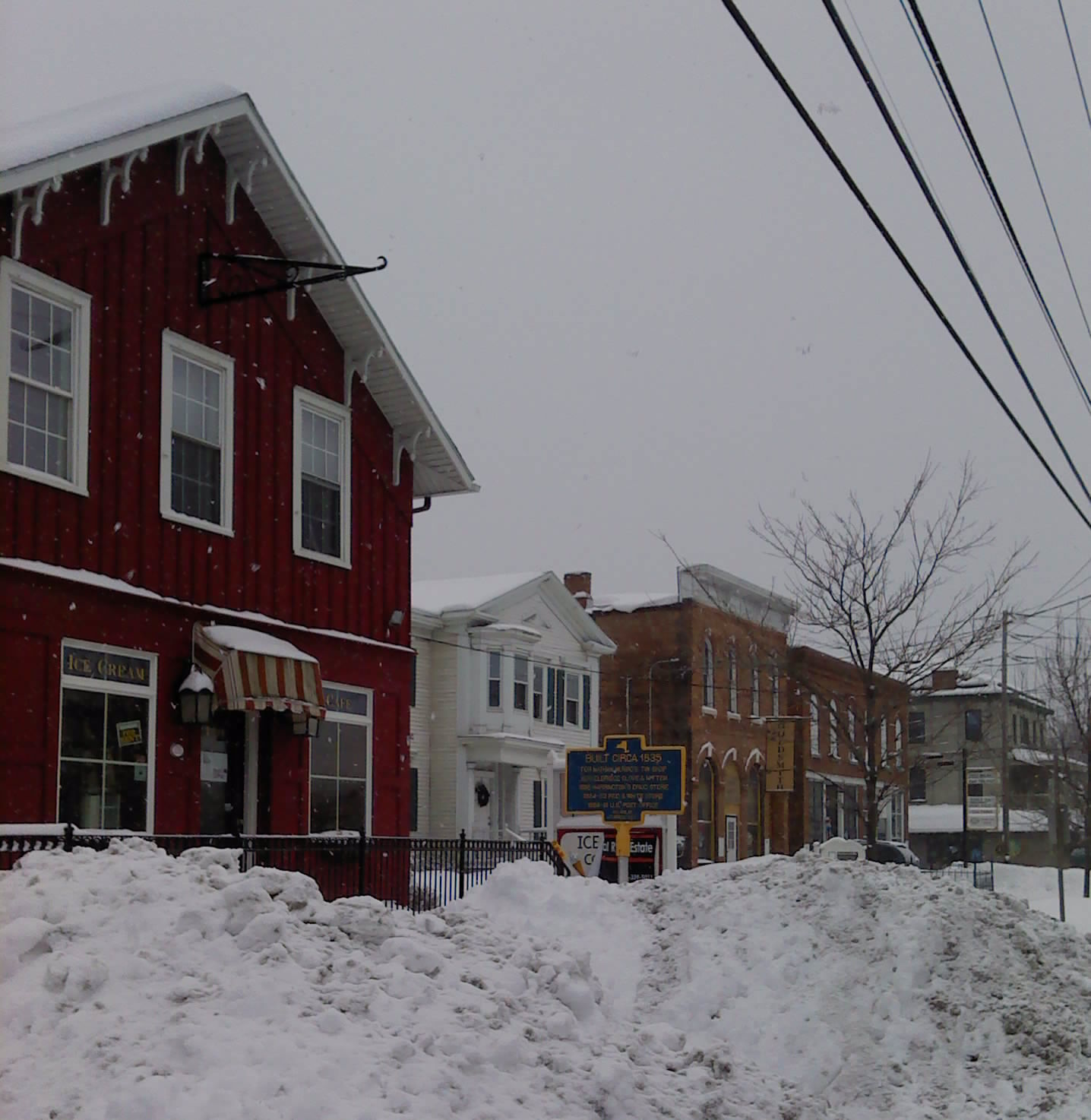
Village of Elbridge commercial center, corner of Jordan Road and NY 5 (Main Street) in January 2011

Several waterways, principally Skaneateles Creek and Carpenter's Brook, provided water power and sustenance. As the town and village expanded with the arrival of new settlers, businesses such as mills, taverns and shops were established. Many industries were located on Skaneateles Creek, including several chair factories and the Amphion Piano Player Company. The Elbridge Electrical Manufacturing Company made electric motors and produced the first electric starter for automobiles. The growth of the village as a prosperous farming and industrial community peaked between 1850 and 1870. In 1835 Nathan Munro founded the Munro Academy, which eventually became [Munro Collegiate Institute] in 1854.

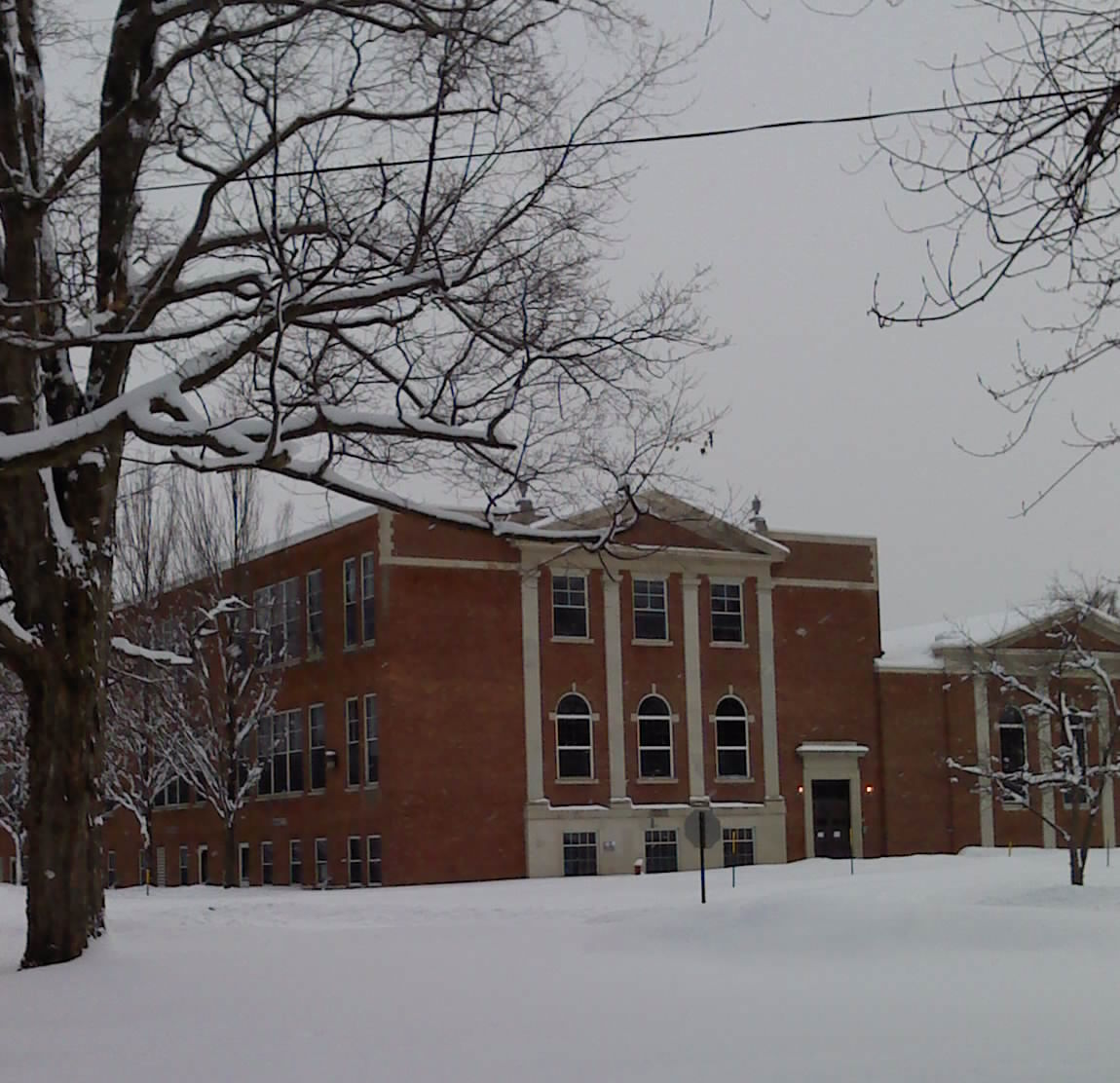
Elbridge Elementary School now on the site of the former Munro Academy

Elbridge Elementary School now occupies the site which The Architectural Instructor Journal called "an open landscape... surrounded by trees, which with the irregularity of the [Gothic-style] plan and outline of the structure itself, contribute to its picturesque effect." (1856). The Main Street of Elbridge (Route 5) is lined with beautiful 19th century homes, including at least one that is said to have been a station on the Underground Railroad and the Wayside Inn. The latter was featured some years ago on national television as one of America's haunted places. According to some stories, a traveler died of a heart attack on the third floor and his spirit, dubbed "George", still flirts with women and plays practical jokes.

== Village of Jordan ==
The Village of Jordan, the larger of the two villages, is located in the northwest section of the town. This settlement became a center of trade and manufacturing with the building of the Erie Canal, which passes directly through town. The remains of the Jordan aqueduct are now a park in downtown Jordan. Later, the main railroad line that traveled the length of New York State ran through Jordan. The fortunes of the village declined when the canal closed in 1912 and the railroads lost business to the trucking industry. Although the New York State thruway runs through the Town of Elbridge, and very close to Jordan itself, there was no exit built for the town. Still, a few industries remain including OWI Wire Mill, Bennet Bolt Works and Northeast Electronics.

== Tessy Plastics ==
Elbridge (specifically the Town of Elbridge) is the headquarters for Tessy Plastics, which manufactures injection molded plastic products. The company, which was founded in 1973 by Henry Beck, employs 1,000 people worldwide – 500 at the Elbridge plant alone. The privately owned and operated company provides fabricated parts and supplies to Xerox, Gillette, Duracell, BT Fuze, Abbott Point of Care, Scott Aviation, Johnson and Johnson companies, Lutron, and Welch Allyn. Although Tessy lost some income when its largest client, Xerox, stopped selling inkjet printers, it has continued to expand with its medical work. In 2003 it added a 60,000-square-foot (5,600 m^{2}) manufacturing addition to the main Elbridge plant and added another 40,000 square feet (3,700 m^{2}) in 2004.

== Notable people ==
- John Adams, (1772–1863), served as a principal at an academy here. (This was John Adams the educator, not the Founding Father)
- Glidden Doman (1921-2016) founder of Doman Helicopters, of Danbury, Connecticut.

== Geography ==
According to the United States Census Bureau, the town has a total area of 38.3 square miles (99.2 km^{2}), of which, 37.6 square miles (97.3 km^{2}) of it is land and 0.7 square miles (1.8 km^{2}) of it (1.85%) is water.

The west town line is the border of Cayuga County.

The Erie Canal/Seneca River system defines part of the north border of the town.

The New York State Thruway (Interstate 90) crosses the north part of the town. New York State Route 317 is a north–south highway in Elbridge. New York State Route 5, in the south, and New York State Route 31, in the north, are east–west highways in the town. New York State Route 321 crosses the southeast part of Elbridge.

== Demographics ==
Historical population
Census	Pop.	Note	%±
1830	3,357		—
1840	4,617		37.5%
1850	3,924		−15.0%
1860	4,509		14.9%
1870	3,796		−15.8%
1880	4,087		7.7%
1890	3,560		−12.9%
1900	3,327		−6.5%
1910	2,980		−10.4%
1920	2,736		−8.2%
1930	2,814		2.9%
1940	2,975		5.7%
1950	3,338		12.2%
1960	4,644		39.1%
1970	5,503		18.5%
1980	5,885		6.9%
1990	6,192		5.2%
2000	6,091		−1.6%
2010	5,922		−2.8%
2020	5,476		−7.5%
U.S. Decennial Census

As of the census of 2000, there were 6,091 people, 2,322 households, and 1,688 families residing in the town. The population density was 162.1 inhabitants per square mile (62.6/km^{2}). There were 2,513 housing units at an average density of 66.9 per square mile (25.8/km^{2}). The racial makeup of the town was 97.70% White, 0.38% Black or African American, 0.41% Native American, 0.46% Asian, 0.26% from other races, and 0.79% from two or more races. Hispanic or Latino of any race were 1.10% of the population.

There were 2,322 households, out of which 36.5% had children under the age of 18 living with them, 56.9% were married couples living together, 10.9% had a female householder with no husband present, and 27.3% were non-families. 23.5% of all households were made up of individuals, and 9.9% had someone living alone who was 65 years of age or older. The average household size was 2.62 and the average family size was 3.08.

In the town, the population was spread out, with 27.3% under the age of 18, 6.6% from 18 to 24, 29.1% from 25 to 44, 23.9% from 45 to 64, and 13.1% who were 65 years of age or older. The median age was 38 years. For every 100 females, there were 98.4 males. For every 100 females age 18 and over, there were 95.8 males.

The median income for a household in the town was $41,444, and the median income for a family was $48,085. Males had a median income of $35,989 versus $25,763 for females. The per capita income for the town was $18,682. About 6.0% of families and 6.9% of the population were below the poverty line, including 6.9% of those under age 18 and 5.2% of those age 65 or over.

== Communities and locations in the Town of Elbridge ==
- Carpenter Brook Fish Hatchery – A fish hatchery near the south town line.
- Cross Lake – a lake partly in the northeast corner of the town.
- Crossman Corners – A location in the southwest part of the town on NY-5.
- Elbridge – The Village of Elbridge near the center of the town at the junction of NY-5 and NY-317.
- Halfway – A hamlet in the southeast corner of the town.
- Jones Point – A location east of South Bay.
- Jordan – The Village of Jordan in the northwest part of the town at the junction of NY-31 and NY-317.
- Laird Corners – A hamlet in the eastern part of the town.
- Memphis – A hamlet on the town line in the northeast corner.
- Peru – A hamlet in the north part of the town near I-90.
- Skaneateles Junction – A hamlet in the south part of the town, also known as "Hartlot."
- South Bay – A bay of Cross Lake inside the town by the north town line.
