= National Register of Historic Places listings in Ontario County, New York =

Location of Ontario County in New York

List of the National Register of Historic Places listings in Ontario County, New York

This is intended to be a complete list of properties and districts listed on the National Register of Historic Places in Ontario County, New York. The locations of National Register properties and districts (at least for all showing latitude and longitude coordinates below) may be seen in a map by clicking on "Map of all coordinates". One property, Boughton Hill, is further designated a National Historic Landmark.

This National Park Service list is complete through NPS recent listings posted November 6, 2026.

Contents: Counties in New York
Albany (Albany) – Allegany – Bronx – Broome – Cattaraugus – Cayuga – Chautauqua – Chemung – Chenango – Clinton – Columbia – Cortland – Delaware – Dutchess (Poughkeepsie, Rhinebeck) – Erie (Buffalo) – Essex – Franklin – Fulton – Genesee – Greene – Hamilton – Herkimer – Jefferson – Kings – Lewis – Livingston – Madison – Monroe (Rochester) – Montgomery – Nassau – New York (Below 14th Street, 14th to 59th Streets, 59th to 110th Streets, Above 110th Street, Islands) – Niagara (Niagara Falls) – Oneida – Onondaga (Syracuse) – Ontario – Orange – Orleans – Oswego – Otsego – Putnam – Queens – Rensselaer – Richmond – Rockland – St. Lawrence – Saratoga – Schenectady – Schoharie – Schuyler – Seneca – Steuben – Suffolk – Sullivan – Tioga – Tompkins – Ulster – Warren – Washington – Wayne – Westchester (Northern, Southern, New Rochelle, Peekskill, Yonkers) – Wyoming – Yates

== County-wide listings ==
	Name on the Register	Image	Date listed	Location	City or town	Description
1	Adelaide Avenue School	Adelaide Avenue School	April 26, 1984 (#84002822)	108-116 Adelaide Ave. 42°53′01″N 77°17′10″W	Canandaigua	
2	Ashcroft	Ashcroft	November 20, 1975 (#75001218)	112 Jay St. 42°51′13″N 76°59′09″W	Geneva	Gothic Revival home designed by Calvert Vaux
3	Levi Barden Cobblestone Farmhouse	Levi Barden Cobblestone Farmhouse	July 25, 2003 (#03000690)	5300 Wabash Rd. 42°46′16″N 77°02′18″W	Seneca	
4	Thomas Barron House	Thomas Barron House	October 6, 1988 (#88001854)	1160 Canandaigua Rd. 42°51′45″N 77°02′01″W	Seneca	
5	Belhurst Castle	Belhurst Castle	January 29, 1987 (#86003728)	Lochland Rd. 42°50′18″N 76°58′39″W	Geneva	House on Seneca Lake, now a restaurant and inn
6	Benham House	Benham House	April 26, 1984 (#84002823)	280-282 S. Main St. 42°52′59″N 77°16′45″W	Canandaigua	
7	Boughton Hill	Boughton Hill	October 15, 1966 (#66000559)	Address Restricted	Victor	Also known as Ganondagan State Historic Site
8	Brigham Hall	Brigham Hall	September 29, 1984 (#84002827)	229 Bristol St. 42°52′45″N 77°17′23″W	Canandaigua	
9	Bristol Center Methodist Episcopal Church		October 28, 2022 (#100008319)	4471 NY 64; 42°48′40″N 77°23′29″W	Bristol	
10	Building at 426 South Main Street	Building at 426 South Main Street	April 26, 1984 (#84002850)	426 S. Main St. 42°52′52″N 77°16′37″W	Canandaigua	1880 brick house and contributing barn in rear are a rare older house remaining in that neighborhood
11	Canandaigua Historic District	Canandaigua Historic District	April 26, 1984 (#84002856)	Catherine, Dungan, Brook, Hubble & Sly Sts., portions of Park, Wood, Washington, Howell, Bemis, Main & Gibson Sts. 42°53′24″N 77°16′59″W	Canandaigua	Core of county seat with many intact 19th- and early 20th-century commercial buildings; boundaries increased on June 7, 2016
12	Canandaigua Veterans Hospital Historic District	Canandaigua Veterans Hospital Historic District	March 27, 2012 (#12000161)	400 Fort Hill Avenue; 42°54′04″N 77°16′11″W	Canandaigua	United States Second Generation Veterans Hospitals Multiple Property Submission
13	Central Naples Historic District		April 4, 2024 (#100008554)	Portions of Academy, Cross, Dumond, Elizabeth, Lyon, Mechanic, Mill, Monier, Ontario, North Main, Reed, South Main, Thrall, and Wall Sts., East and West Aves. 42°36′49″N 77°24′14″W	Naples	
14	Thaddeus Chapin House	Thaddeus Chapin House	April 26, 1984 (#84002861)	128 Thad Chapin St. 42°52′55″N 77°17′30″W	Canandaigua	
15	Ephraim Cleveland House	Ephraim Cleveland House	February 18, 1994 (#94000047)	201 N. Main St. 42°37′34″N 77°23′41″W	Naples	
16	Clifton Springs Sanitarium	Clifton Springs Sanitarium	April 6, 1979 (#79001615)	11 and 9 E. Main St; 42°57′40″N 77°08′14″W	Clifton Springs	
17	Clifton Springs Sanitarium Historic District	Clifton Springs Sanitarium Historic District	May 24, 1990 (#90000818)	E. Main St. between Crane and Prospect; 42°57′40″N 77°08′13″W	Clifton Springs	
18	Cobblestone Manor	Cobblestone Manor	April 26, 1984 (#84002862)	495 N. Main St. 42°54′08″N 77°17′30″W	Canandaigua	
19	Cobblestone Railroad Pumphouse	Cobblestone Railroad Pumphouse	May 22, 1992 (#92000551)	Main St. 43°00′31″N 77°28′02″W	Victor	
20	Jeremiah Cronkite House	Jeremiah Cronkite House	February 5, 2002 (#01001563)	1095 Lynaugh Rd. 42°58′59″N 77°23′51″W	Victor	
21	John and Mary Dickson House	John and Mary Dickson House	November 19, 2008 (#08001077)	9010 Main St. 42°54′20″N 77°32′19″W	West Bloomfield	
22	East Bloomfield Historic District	East Bloomfield Historic District	November 13, 1989 (#89001947)	Roughly Main, South, Park Sts. and NY 5; 42°53′43″N 77°26′04″W	East Bloomfield	
23	Fairview Cemetery		November 20, 2023 (#100009097)	North side of Mount Pleasant St. west of North Main St. 42°37′33″N 77°23′46″W	Naples	
24	Farmers and Merchants Bank	Farmers and Merchants Bank	February 28, 2008 (#08000102)	24-26 Linden St. 42°52′03″N 76°59′02″W	Geneva	
25	Farmington Quaker Crossroads Historic District		April 25, 2007 (#07000384)	Cty Rd. 8 at Sheldon Rd. 43°01′41″N 77°19′19″W	Farmington	
26	Felt Cobblestone General Store	Felt Cobblestone General Store	May 22, 1992 (#92000553)	6452 Victor-Manchester Rd. 42°58′28″N 77°22′53″W	Victor	
27	First Baptist Church		October 10, 2002 (#02001118)	134 N. Main St. 42°52′16″N 76°59′15″W	Geneva	
28	First Baptist Church of Phelps	First Baptist Church of Phelps	May 22, 1992 (#92000554)	40 Church St. 42°57′18″N 77°03′31″W	Phelps	
29	Genesee Park Historic District	Genesee Park Historic District	October 10, 2002 (#02001117)	Genesee Park, Genesee Park Place, and Genesee and Lewis Streets; 42°52′16″N 76°59′02″W	Geneva	Includes St. Peter's Episcopal Church
30	Geneva Armory	Geneva Armory	March 2, 1995 (#95000082)	300 Main Street; 42°52′01″N 76°59′07″W	Geneva	
31	Geneva Downtown Commercial Historic District	Geneva Downtown Commercial Historic District	May 13, 2014 (#14000225)	8-156 Castle, 16 & 20 E. Castle, 396-555 Exchange, 20-120 Seneca, 24-52 Linden & 317, 319, 325 & 329 Main Streets; 42°52′04″N 76°59′01″W	Geneva	
32	Geneva Hall and Trinity Hall, Hobart & William Smith College	Geneva Hall and Trinity Hall, Hobart & William Smith College	July 16, 1973 (#73001241)	S. Main St. 42°51′29″N 76°58′57″W	Geneva	
33	William W. Gorham House	William W. Gorham House	June 7, 2024 (#100010386)	5266 Parrish Street Extension; 42°51′56″N 77°18′17″W	Canandaigua	
34	Granger Cottage	Granger Cottage	April 26, 1984 (#84002865)	60 Granger St. 42°53′51″N 77°17′07″W	Canandaigua	
35	Francis Granger House	Francis Granger House	April 26, 1984 (#84002867)	426 N. Main St. 42°54′02″N 77°17′29″W	Canandaigua	
36	Harmon Cobblestone Farmhouse and Cobblestone Smokehouse		May 22, 1992 (#92000552)	983 Smith Rd. 42°59′31″N 77°07′29″W	Phelps	
37	Dr. John Quincy Howe House	Dr. John Quincy Howe House	February 5, 2002 (#01001564)	66 Main St. 42°57′26″N 77°03′22″W	Phelps	
38	William Huffman Cobblestone House		December 31, 2002 (#02001647)	1064 Townline Rd. 42°59′04″N 76°58′06″W	Phelps	
39	Knights of the Maccabees Hall		June 13, 2013 (#13000371)	4270 NY 21; 42°49′19″N 77°19′39″W	Cheshire	
40	Marshall House	Marshall House	April 26, 1984 (#84002869)	274 Bristol St. 42°52′49″N 77°17′29″W	Canandaigua	
41	Miller Corsets, Inc. Factory	Miller Corsets, Inc. Factory	August 27, 2020 (#100005473)	10 Chapin St. 42°53′12″N 77°16′54″W	Canandaigua	
42	Morgan Hook and Ladder Company	Morgan Hook and Ladder Company	June 2, 1995 (#95000668)	18-20 Mill St. 42°36′55″N 77°24′13″W	Naples	
43	Naples Memorial Town Hall	Naples Memorial Town Hall	May 13, 1996 (#96000482)	N. Main St., northeast corner of the junction of N. Main and Monier Sts. 42°37′02″N 77°24′02″W	Naples	
44	Naples South Main Street Historic District		November 14, 2022 (#100008347)	Portions of James, South Main, Reed, Sprague, and Weld Sts. 42°36′48″N 77°24′14″W	Naples	
45	Naples Viniculture Historic District		November 15, 2022 (#100008381)	Portions of North Main St., Tobey St., and West Ave. 42°37′27″N 77°23′55″W	Naples	
46	Nester House	Nester House	April 9, 1984 (#84002873)	1001 Lochland Rd. 42°50′55″N 76°58′48″W	Geneva	
47	North Main Street Historic District	North Main Street Historic District	July 20, 1973 (#73001239)	Between RR tracks and Buffalo-Chapel St. 42°53′35″N 77°17′08″W	Canandaigua	
48	Ontario and Livingston Mutual Insurance Office	Ontario and Livingston Mutual Insurance Office	November 21, 2008 (#08001078)	9018 Main St. 42°54′22″N 77°32′16″W	West Bloomfield	
49	Osborne House	Osborne House	July 11, 1980 (#80002732)	146 Maple Ave. 42°58′42″N 77°24′38″W	Victor	
50	Parrott Hall		August 12, 1971 (#71000553)	W. North St. between Castle St. and Preemption Rd. 42°52′36″N 77°00′30″W	Geneva	
51	Watrous Peck House	Watrous Peck House	March 13, 2017 (#100000756)	8814 Wesley Rd. 42°52′09″N 77°31′25″W	West Bloomfield	1803 New England-style Georgian house built by settler from that region
52	Phelps Town Hall	Phelps Town Hall	April 25, 1996 (#96000485)	79 Main St. 42°57′25″N 77°03′28″W	Phelps	
53	Port Gibson United Methodist Church		November 29, 1996 (#96001387)	2951 Greig St. 43°02′13″N 77°09′23″W	Port Gibson	
54	Rippey Cobblestone Farmhouse		October 6, 1992 (#92001051)	1227 Leet Rd. 42°50′28″N 77°02′19″W	Seneca	
55	St. Bridget's Roman Catholic Church Complex	St. Bridget's Roman Catholic Church Complex	August 28, 1992 (#92001052)	15 Church St., between Church and Michigan Sts. 42°54′02″N 77°25′57″W	Bloomfield	
56	St. Francis de Sales Parish Complex	St. Francis de Sales Parish Complex	August 10, 2015 (#15000514)	94, 110, 130 & 140 Exchange Street; 42°52′24″N 76°58′47″W	Geneva	Complex built over 10 years beginning in 1864 reflects the rapid growth of the city's Catholic population
57	St. John's Episcopal Church		November 7, 1978 (#78001892)	Church St. 42°57′23″N 77°03′28″W	Phelps	
58	St. Peter's Episcopal Church	St. Peter's Episcopal Church	November 29, 1996 (#96001389)	44 Main St. 42°54′01″N 77°25′28″W	Bloomfield	
59	St. Stephen's Roman Catholic Church Complex		August 12, 2025 (#100012105)	48 Pulteney Street, 17 Elmwood Avenue, and 90 Pulteney Street; 42°52′03″N 76°59′18″W	Geneva	
60	Saltonstall Street School	Saltonstall Street School	April 26, 1984 (#84002877)	47 Saltonstall St. 42°53′03″N 77°16′36″W	Canandaigua	
61	Seneca Chief (shipwreck)		November 25, 2024 (#100011074)	Address Restricted	Canandaigua	
62	Seneca Presbyterian Church		May 25, 1973 (#73001242)	East of Stanley off NY 245 on Number Nine Rd. 42°48′20″N 77°03′05″W	Stanley	
63	Smith Observatory and Dr. William R. Brooks House		April 11, 2008 (#08000275)	618-620 Castle St. 42°52′20″N 77°00′11″W	Geneva	
64	Smith's Opera House	Smith's Opera House	October 10, 1979 (#02001454)	82 Seneca St. 42°52′02″N 76°59′03″W	Geneva	
65	Sonnenberg Gardens	Sonnenberg Gardens	September 28, 1973 (#73001240)	151 Charlotte St. 42°54′00″N 77°16′21″W	Canandaigua	
66	South Bristol Grange Hall 1107		December 19, 1997 (#97001528)	6457 NY 64; 42°42′28″N 77°22′50″W	Bristol Springs	
67	South Farmington Friends Cemetery and Meetinghouse Site		February 2, 2024 (#100009878)	4899 Shortsville Rd & County Road 28; 42°57′24″N 77°16′45″W	Farmington	
68	South Main Street Historic District	South Main Street Historic District	December 31, 1974 (#74001286)	Irregular pattern along S. Main St. 42°51′27″N 76°58′59″W	Geneva	
69	Philetus Swift House		March 15, 2005 (#05000159)	866 NY 96; 42°56′56″N 77°01′06″W	Phelps	
70	US Post Office-Canandaigua	US Post Office-Canandaigua	November 17, 1988 (#88002465)	28 N. Main St. 42°53′18″N 77°16′57″W	Canandaigua	Neoclassical structure completed in 1910 with front facade modeled after Erechtheion on the Acropolis in Athens. One of only three post offices in the state designed by private architects under the Tarsney Act.
71	US Post Office-Geneva	US Post Office-Geneva	May 11, 1989 (#88002523)	67 Castle St. 42°52′03″N 76°59′07″W	Geneva	
72	Valentown Hall	Valentown Hall	May 9, 1997 (#97000425)	Jct. of High St. and Valentown Rd. 43°01′34″N 77°26′09″W	Victor	
73	Oliver Warner Farmstead		November 17, 1988 (#88002189)	NY 88; 42°54′51″N 77°07′51″W	Clifton Springs	
74	Warren–Benham House		November 9, 2017 (#100001805)	5680 Seneca Point Rd. 42°44′40″N 77°20′24″W	Bristol Springs	1924 Tudor-style house was one of the first vacation cottages built in the area
75	Washington Street Cemetery		June 4, 2002 (#02000616)	Washington St. 42°51′44″N 76°59′27″W	Geneva	
76	George and Addison Wheeler House		March 15, 2005 (#05000168)	6353 and 6342 Grimble Rd. 42°51′33″N 77°22′22″W	East Bloomfield	Boundary increase approved December 28, 2020
77	Wilder Cemetery	Wilder Cemetery	March 23, 2003 (#03000130)	NY 64; 42°44′08″N 77°23′53″W	S. Bristol	
78	Woodlawn Cemetery	Woodlawn Cemetery	November 12, 2014 (#14000914)	130 N. Pearl St. 42°53′18″N 77°17′56″W	Canandaigua	Last resting place of many important early residents, Woodlawn shows the evolution from a churchyard cemetery to a rural one

== See also ==
- National Register of Historic Places listings in New York
