= John B. Chapin =

American physician

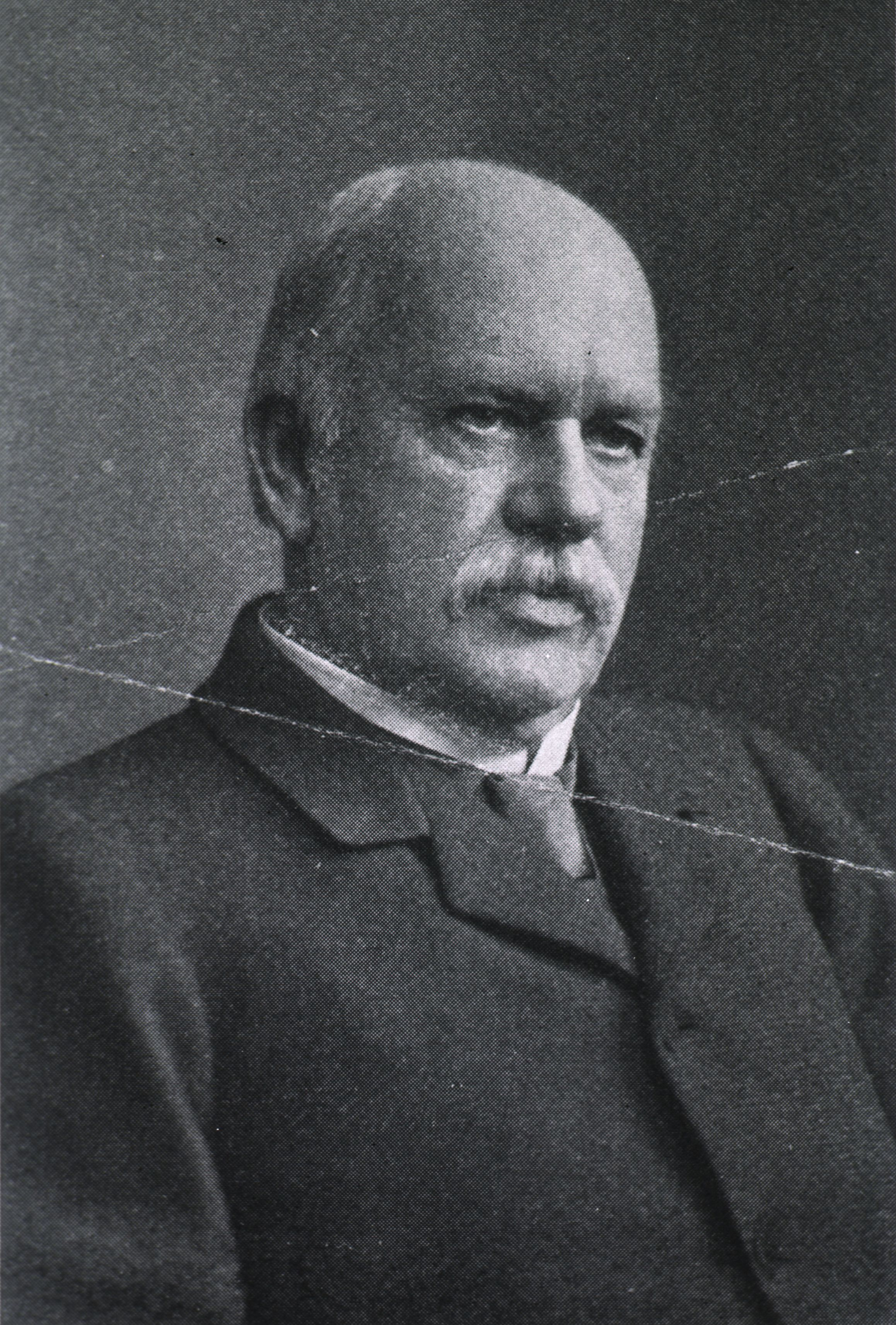
- Born: December 4, 1829; New York City, New York, U.S.
- Died: January 17, 1918 (aged 88); Canandaigua, New York, US
- Education: Williams College
- Scientific career
- Fields: Psychiatry

John Basset Chapin M.D. (4 December 1829 – 17 January 1918) was an American physician and mental hospital administrator. He was an advocate for the removal of mentally ill patients from the almshouses in New York State to a hospital setting and helped to pass a state law that provided hospital care for the patients.

== Childhood & education ==
John B. Chapin was born 4 December 1829 in New York City, son of William Chapin and Elizabeth Bassett. Chapin’s father was interested in the care of the blind, and he moved the family from New York to Pennsylvania, and then to Columbus, Ohio, where his father became director of the Institution for the Blind. In 1849, Chapin entered the Western Reserve College (Ohio). After a year, he transferred to Williams College (Massachusetts) and received the A.B. degree in 1850.

Chapin began his medical career under Dr. John Swett, an attending physician at New York Hospital. (Chapin’s maternal great grandfather had been a hospital governor and a charter member). In 1852, Chapin was a member of the medical staff and attended lectures at Jefferson Medical College in Philadelphia. In 1853, he received his medical degree. He was named house physician at a New York Hospital in 1854.

== Career ==
On completion of his training at the New York Hospital, he joined the medical staff of the State Lunatic Hospital in Utica, New York, then the only public mental hospital in the state. He worked there for four years. From 1858 to 1860, he organized and managed an institution for the blind in St. Louis, Missouri. He returned to Canandaigua, New York to practice at Brigham Hall, a private mental hospital.

By the mid-nineteenth century, the New York State Medical Society was interested in the care of insane people in the counties’ almshouses. Existing laws and practices provided that people who had been insane for a year or more could be committed to local almshouses by the state’s courts, where there was little medical care and poor living conditions. The New York State Legislature passed a law that courts could appoint a physician in each county to visit the almshouses and to report to the state Legislature on the insane confined there. The reports were sent to the New York State Medical Society, which urged the state Legislature to provide a hospital for the mentally ill patients. In 1865, the Legislature authorized such an institution and mandated that insane people would no longer be committed to counties’ almshouses.

Chapin was appointed by the New York State Governor to a committee to select a site for the new facility. Chapin was responsible for planning the construction and chose to create a segregated facility with access to farm facilities for patient occupational therapy. The Legislature appointed a Board of Trustees which elected Chapin as its first superintendent. He remained in the post until 1884. The new hospital led in the care of chronic mentally ill people.

In 1884, following the death of Dr. Thomas Kirkbridge, the first physician-in-Chief of the Department of the Insane of the Pennsylvania Hospital, Chapin was named the new chief physician and remained there for 23 years. He authorized the building of new facilities to accommodate a growing patient population; the opening of a dispensary for treating incipient cases; and the instituting of new practices to improve patient care. He retired in 1911 and spent his last years at his home in Canandaigua, New York.

== Honors & Memberships ==
Chapin received numerous honors during his active years including L.L.D. degrees from Williams College and Jefferson Medical College. He was an honorary member of the Medical Psychological Association of Great Britain and Ireland, and the Société de Médicine Mentale de Belgium. He was an active member of the American Medico-Psychological Association (now the American Psychiatric Association) and was president from 1888 to 1889.

== Death ==
Chapin died on January 17, 1918, at his home in Canandaigua, New York, surrounded by his children.
