= Genesee Park =

Genesee Park may refer to:

- Genesee Avenue Park, a Los Angeles park near Hollywood
- Genesee Park (Colorado), first and largest of the Denver Mountain Parks (on Genesee Mountain and Bald Mountain)
  - Genesee Mountain Park Training Annex (1955–70), a radar site with 3 acres (1.2 ha) of federally owned land at the park (property # B08CO0493, cf. the Weld County "High Frequency Radar Station Site" property B08CO0494)
- Genesee Park (Allegany County, New York)
- Genesee Park (Ontario County, New York)
  - Genesee Park Historic District, the 16 contributing properties associated with the Ontario County park in Ontario County, New York
- Genesee Park (Seattle), in Seattle, Washington
- Genesee Valley Park, in Rochester, New York, along the Genesee River
