= Cheshire, New York =

Hamlet in New York, United States

Coordinates: 42°49′20″N 77°19′38″W

Cheshire is a hamlet in the Town of Canandaigua, Ontario County, New York, United States, located near Canandaigua Lake. It is located 7 miles (11 km) south-southwest of the City of Canandaigua, at an elevation of 1,024 feet (312 m). The primary cross roads where the hamlet is located are N.Y. Route 21, Woolhouse Road and Goodale Road. U.S. Route 20 and New York State Route 5 pass just north of Cheshire.

The Knights of the Maccabees Hall was listed on the National Register of Historic Places in 2013.
