= Building at 426 South Main Street =

- U.S. National Register of Historic Places
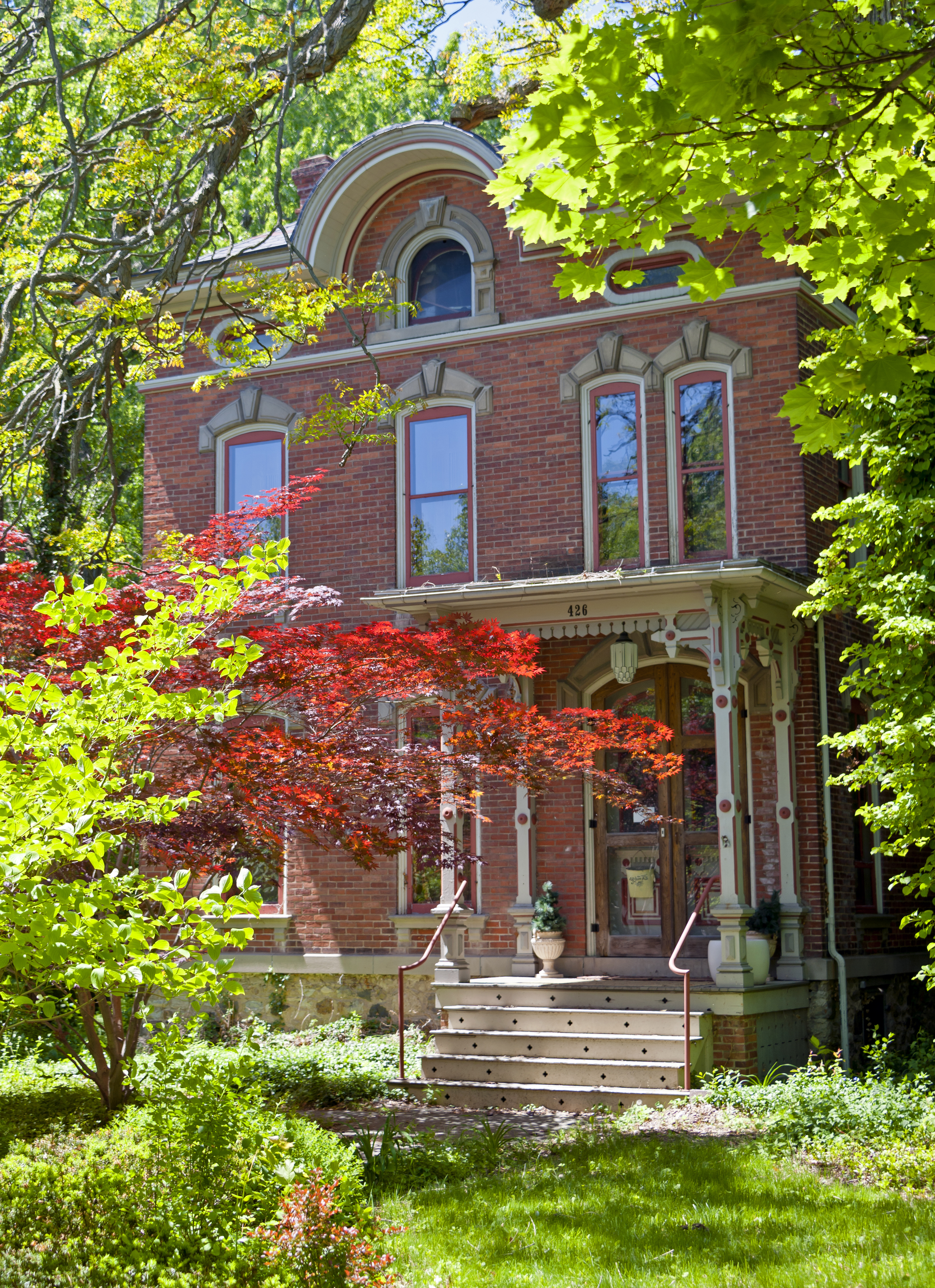
- East (front) elevation, 2014

- Location within New York Location within the United States
- Interactive map of Building at 426 South Main Street
- Location: 426 S. Main St., Canandaigua, NY
- Coordinates: 42°52′52″N 77°16′37″W
- Area: 1 acre (4,000 m^{2})
- Built: 1880
- Architectural style: Renaissance, Italianate
- MPS: Canandaigua MRA
- NRHP reference No.: 84002850
- Added to NRHP: April 26, 1984

The building at 426 South Main Street (also New York State Routes 21 and 332) is located in Canandaigua, New York, United States. It is a two-story brick dwelling in the Italianate architectural style built around 1880. In 1984 it and its neighboring barn were listed on the National Register of Historic Places.

It is the only remaining house from that era on that block. While its form is Italianate, its upper arches are more typical of Renaissance Revival buildings, a style that was starting to become popular at the time of the building's construction. Its architect is unknown. At the time of its listing on the Register it doubled as a residence and antique shop. Today, however, as at the time of its construction, it is solely used as a residence.

== Buildings ==
The building is located on the west side of South Main, midway between the intersections with Parrish and (on the west side) Phelps, and Clark streets. One block further to the south, South Main intersects with Western Boulevard (New York State Route 5 and U.S. Route 20), running parallel to the north shore of Canandaigua Lake. The terrain is level, reflecting the proximity of the lake.

To both the north and south are houses of newer construction, mostly smaller in size as well. These give way to larger commercial properties, such as the gas station on the Parrish corner. Across the street is a similar combination of newer houses and larger commercial buildings with large parking lots, with a large storage facility on the land behind them. To the west the land is wooded and largely undeveloped as far as Sucker Brook, other than the back lots of commercial properties on Parrish.

The house sits on a one-acre (4,000 m^{2}) lot sheltered by mature trees, in contrast to the more open, and smaller, neighboring lots, with its gravel driveway on the south. It is a two-story, three-bay structure on an exposed stone foundation, topped with a truncated hipped roof pierced by two corbellled brick chimneys at the ends. A two-story, one-bay projecting pavilion is located in the center of the north elevation, matched by a two-story bay window on the south side.

Attached to the west (rear) elevation is a two-story wing, also with a hipped roof and chimney, projects. On its west is a one-story wood frame addition with a gable roof and clapboard siding with irregular fenestration. A small one-story enclosed frame clapboard-sided porch is nestled in the southwest corner between it and the main block.

On the east (front) facade the main entrance, in the northernmost of the three bays, is sheltered by a flat-roofed wooden porch supported by four ornate wooden pillars with scroll brackets and pierced woodwork at the roofline. Wooden steps with pierced quatrefoils rise up to it, flanked by metal handrails. The porch's brick foundation is topped with a wooden deck.

A stone water table sets off the foundation stone from the brick facing the house. Windows on the facade are all one-over-one double-hung sash windows set in a slightly recessed wooden surround and topped by segmentally arched drip molds, as are all windows elsewhere on the building. The only deviation is above the front porch, where two narrower versions of the windows echo the double main entrance doors below.

Above the second story is a projecting molded cornice that continues around the entire main block. The frieze it sets off features a large semi-circular cross-gable set with a round-arched single-pane casement window in paneled stone trim. At the top of every bay except those on the pavilion and bay window is a recessed elongated oval oculus set in stone trim. The roofline is marked by a wide overhanging eave with another molded cornice.

The main entrance has two sets of double doors set in a segmental-arched entryway topped with a drip mold, similar to the windows. The outer doors are wooden with three large glass panes. They protect a pair of wooden inner doors with decoration similar to that on the porch just outside. Among the original interior features in the house are its original stairwell and two marble mantels.

== History ==
Very little is known about the house's origins. Its builder, architect and original owners or inhabitants are unknown. It is, however, believed that the house and adjacent barn, a contributing resource to the National Register listing, were built around 1880. An Italianate overall form was combined with upper-level decoration that reflected the newer Renaissance Revival style.

At the time of its construction neighboring houses were in similar Late Victorian modes. Over time they were all demolished, leaving only 426 to exemplify its two styles. In 1984, when the house was listed on the Register, its owner was operating an antique shop on the ground floor, leading to the use of "building" rather than "house" in the listing name. The front steps also had wooden balustrades rather than their current metal rails.

== See also ==
- National Register of Historic Places listings in Ontario County, New York
