= Thaddeus Chapin House =

Historic house in New York, United States

- U.S. National Register of Historic Places
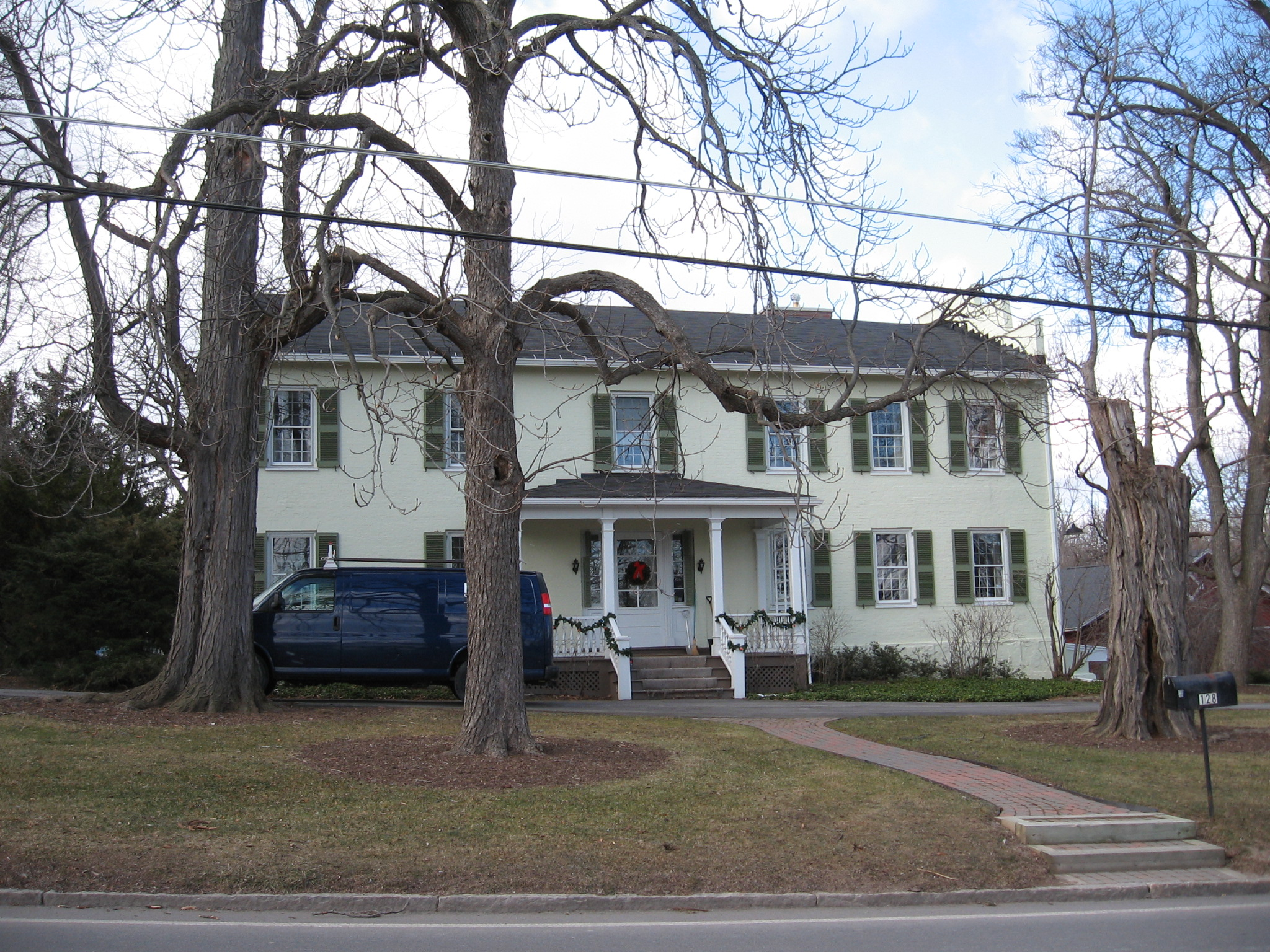

- Location within New York Location within the United States
- Location: 128 Thad Chapin St., Canandaigua, New York
- Coordinates: 42°52′55″N 77°17′30″W
- Area: 1.7 acres (0.69 ha)
- Built: 1820
- Architectural style: Federal
- MPS: Canandaigua MRA
- NRHP reference No.: 84002861
- Added to NRHP: April 26, 1984

The Thaddeus Chapin House is a historic house located at 128 Thad Chapin Street in Canandaigua, Ontario County, New York.

== Description and history ==
It is a two-story, six-bay-wide, brick dwelling on a slightly raised basement in the Federal style. The sides of the house have a steeped gabled roof and there is front porch in the center of the house around the main entrance. It was built in the 1820s. Also on the property is a late 19th-century frame barn.

It was listed on the National Register of Historic Places on April 26, 1984.
