= Francis Granger House =

Historic house in New York, United States

- U.S. National Register of Historic Places
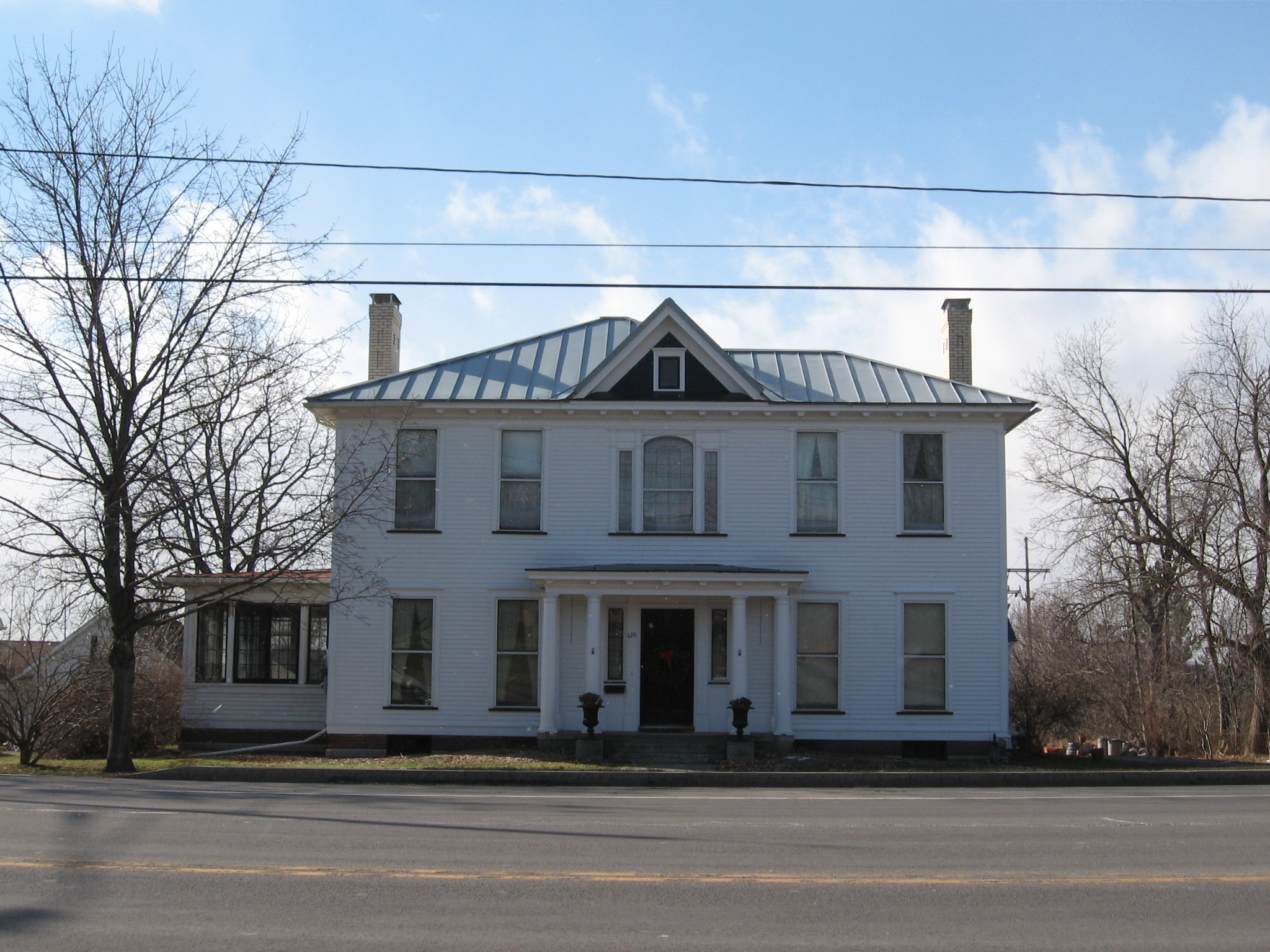
- Frances Granger House, January 2008

- Location within New York Location within the United States
- Location: 426 N. Main St., Canandaigua, New York
- Coordinates: 42°54′2″N 77°17′29″W
- Area: 8.8 acres (3.6 ha)
- Built: 1817
- Architectural style: Federal
- MPS: Canandaigua MRA
- NRHP reference No.: 84002867
- Added to NRHP: April 26, 1984

Francis Granger House is a historic home located at Canandaigua in Ontario County, New York. It is a two-story, five-bay center hall frame structure, in an extensively altered Federal style. It was built in 1817 and was the home of nationally prominent Whig politician Francis Granger until 1827.

It was listed on the National Register of Historic Places in 1984.
