= Cobblestone Manor =

Historic house in New York, United States

- U.S. National Register of Historic Places
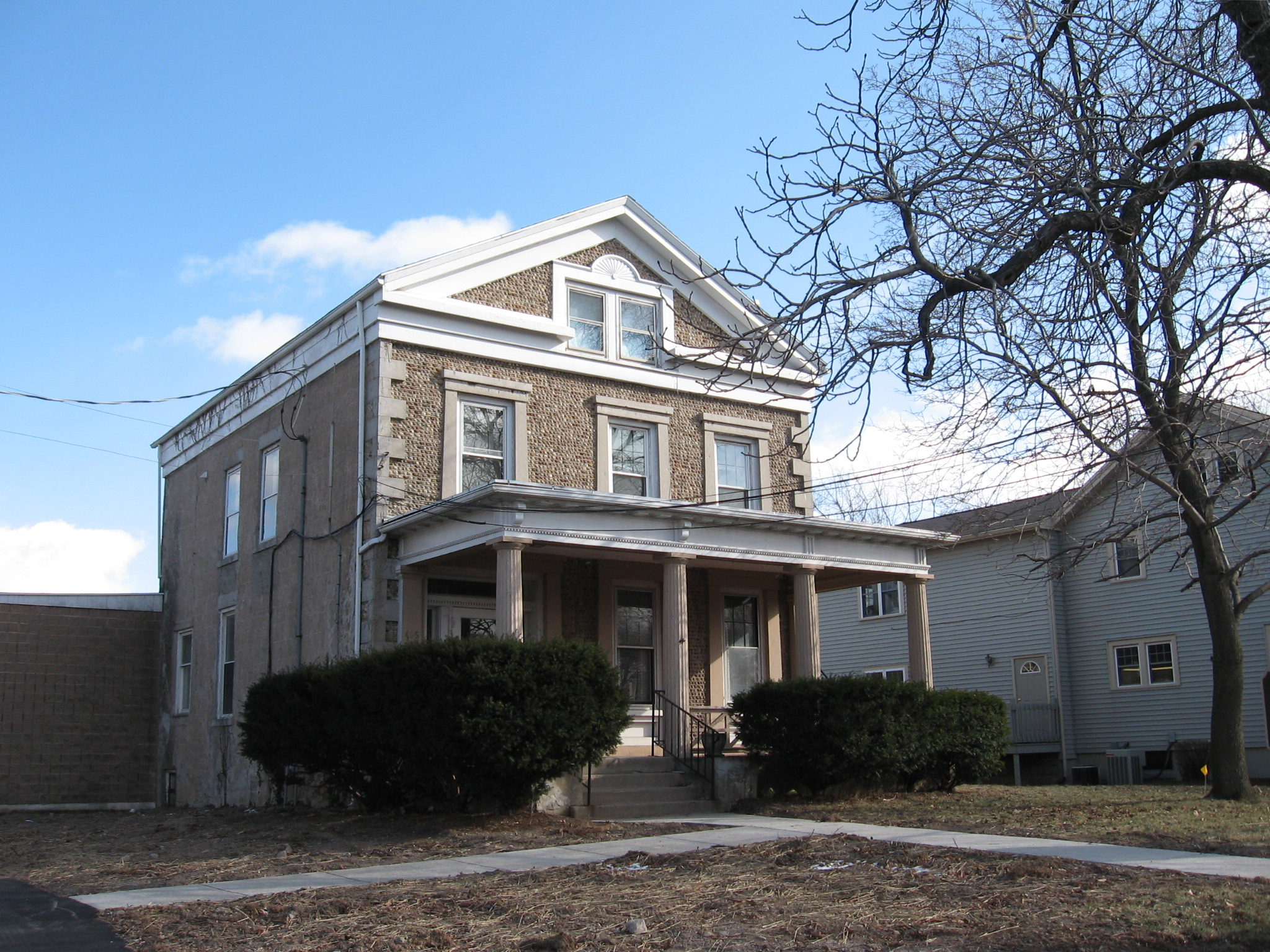

- Location within New York Location within the United States
- Location: 495 N. Main St., Canandaigua, New York
- Coordinates: 42°54′8″N 77°17′30″W
- Area: 1.5 acres (0.61 ha)
- Built: 1835
- Architectural style: Greek Revival
- MPS: Canandaigua MRA
- NRHP reference No.: 84002862
- Added to NRHP: April 26, 1984

Cobblestone Manor is a historic home located at Canandaigua in Ontario County, New York. It is a two-story cobblestone dwelling built in the 1830s in the Greek Revival style. Early 20th century additions include a Colonial Revival style front porch with fluted Doric columns and a cornice decorated with modillions.

It was listed on the National Register of Historic Places in 1984.
