= Knights of the Maccabees Hall =

- U.S. National Register of Historic Places
- Location within New York Location within the United States
- Location: 4270 NY 21, Cheshire, New York
- Coordinates: 42.82194°N 77.32762°W
- Area: Less than 1 acre (0.40 ha)
- Built: 1898
- NRHP reference No.: 13000371
- Added to NRHP: June 13, 2013

Knights of the Maccabees Hall, also known as Cheshire Meeting Hall, is a historic meeting hall located at Cheshire, Ontario County, New York. It was built in 1898, and is a 1/1/2-story, rectangular, frame building with a front-gable roof and clad in clapboard siding. It measures 36.6 feet wide and 65 feet long and rests on a stone and concrete foundation with basement. In addition to the Knights of the Maccabees, the building also hosted a local chapter of the Grand Army of the Republic and the Cheshire Grange, who purchased the building in 1920. The building has hosted numerous community events.

It was listed on the National Register of Historic Places in 2013.
