= Marshall House (Canandaigua, New York) =

Historic house in New York, United States

- U.S. National Register of Historic Places
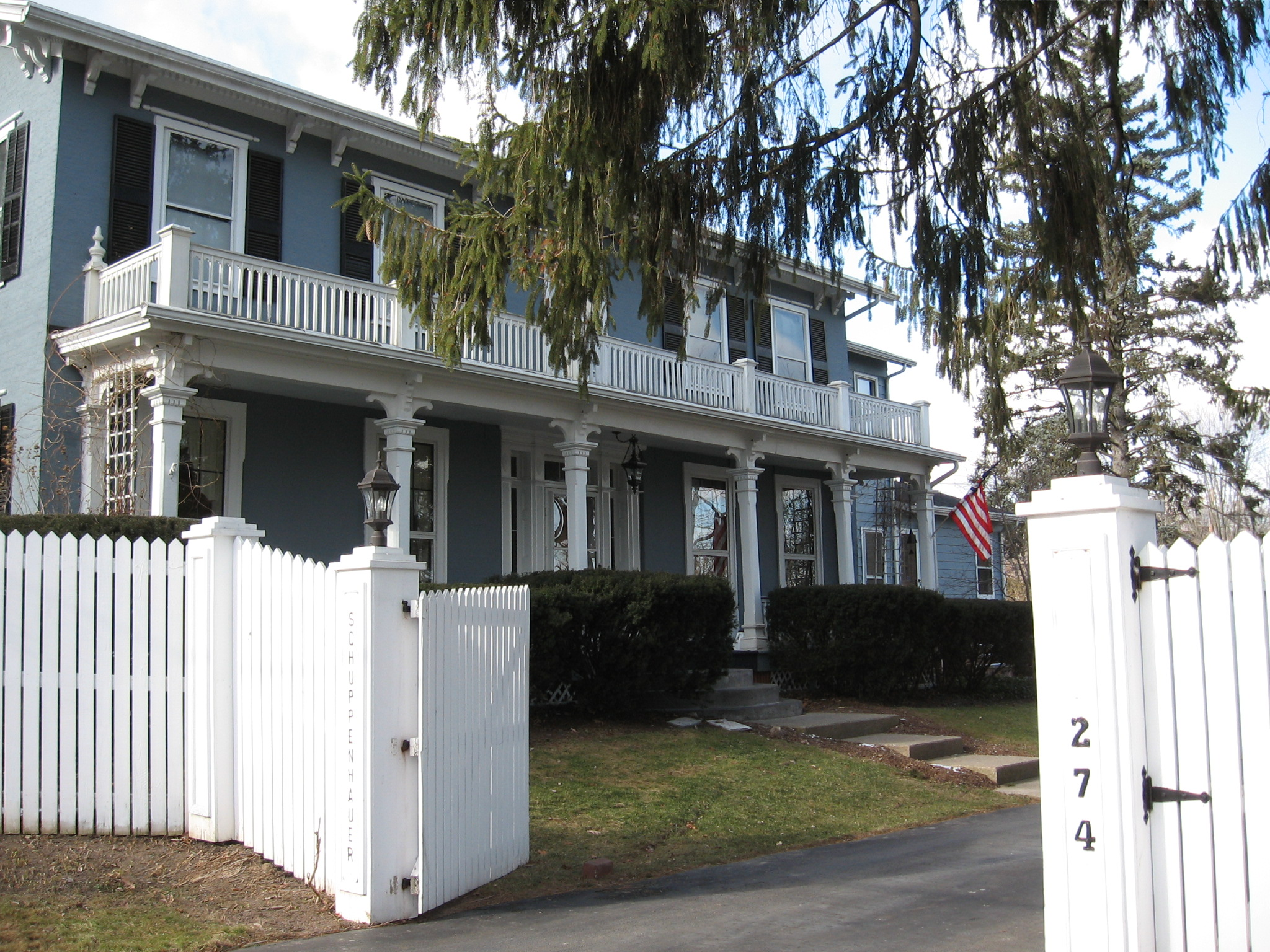

- Location within New York Location within the United States
- Interactive map showing the location of Marshall House
- Location: 274 Bristol St., Canandaigua, New York
- Coordinates: 42°52′49″N 77°17′29″W
- Area: 1 acre (0.40 ha)
- Built: 1844
- Architectural style: Italianate, Federal
- MPS: Canandaigua MRA
- NRHP reference No.: 84002869
- Added to NRHP: April 26, 1984

Marshall House is a historic home located at Canandaigua in Ontario County, New York. It is a two-story, five bay center hall brick dwelling on a slightly raised basement. Although built in 1844 with later alterations, it has characteristics of the Federal style. It is currently a private residence.

It was listed on the National Register of Historic Places in 1984.
