= Benham House =

Historic house in New York, United States

- U.S. National Register of Historic Places
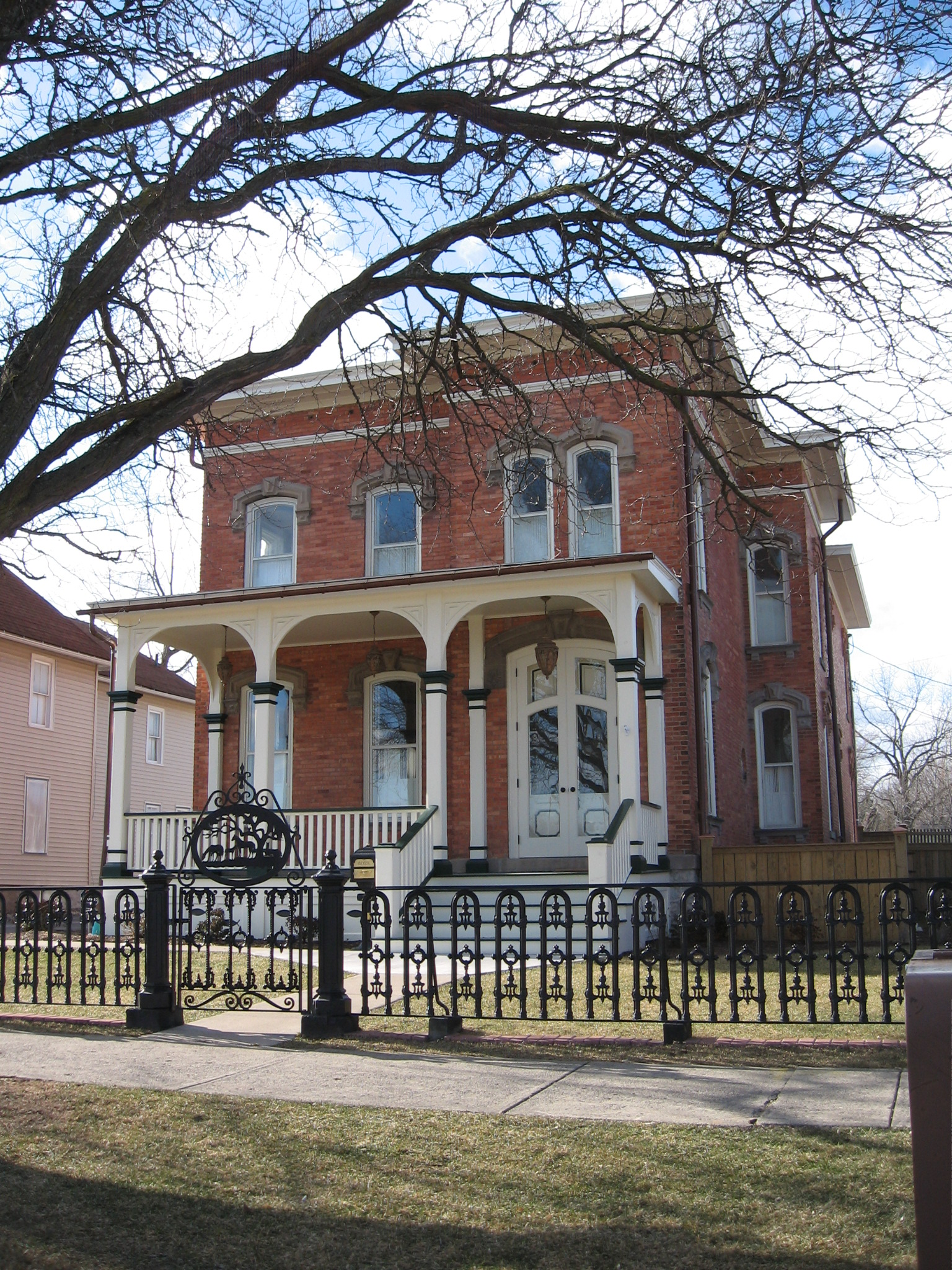
- Benham House, January 2008

- Location within New York Location within the United States
- Location: 280-282 S. Main St., Canandaigua, New York
- Coordinates: 42°52′59″N 77°16′45″W
- Area: less than one acre
- Built: 1876
- Architectural style: Italianate
- MPS: Canandaigua MRA
- NRHP reference No.: 84002823
- Added to NRHP: April 26, 1984

The Benham House is a historic house located at 280-282 South Main Street in Canandaigua, Ontario County, New York.

== Description and history ==
It was built in about 1876, and is a two-story, three-bay wide, Italianate-style brick dwelling. It features a low hipped roof topped by a cupola with cast iron cresting, full-width front porch, and two-story projecting bay window.

It was listed on the National Register of Historic Places on April 26, 1984.
