= Seneca Presbyterian Church =

Historic church in New York, United States

- U.S. National Register of Historic Places
- Location within New York Location within the United States
- Nearest city: Stanley, New York
- Coordinates: 42°48′20″N 77°3′5″W
- Area: 1.5 acres (0.61 ha)
- Built: 1838
- NRHP reference No.: 73001242
- Added to NRHP: May 25, 1973

Seneca Presbyterian Church, also known as the "Number Nine" Church, is a historic Presbyterian church located at Stanley in Ontario County, New York. The original section of the church was constructed in 1838. It was widened in 1863 and the bell tower and front vestibule added about 1873. The church took its final form in 1889, with additional changes to the vestibule and interior decoration. The interior features a trompe l'oeil fresco depicting a succession of arched openings and rooms with coffered ceilings and checkered floors. Also on the property is the church cemetery and chapel or parish house.

It was listed on the National Register of Historic Places in 1973.
