= Granger Cottage =

Historic house in New York, United States

- U.S. National Register of Historic Places
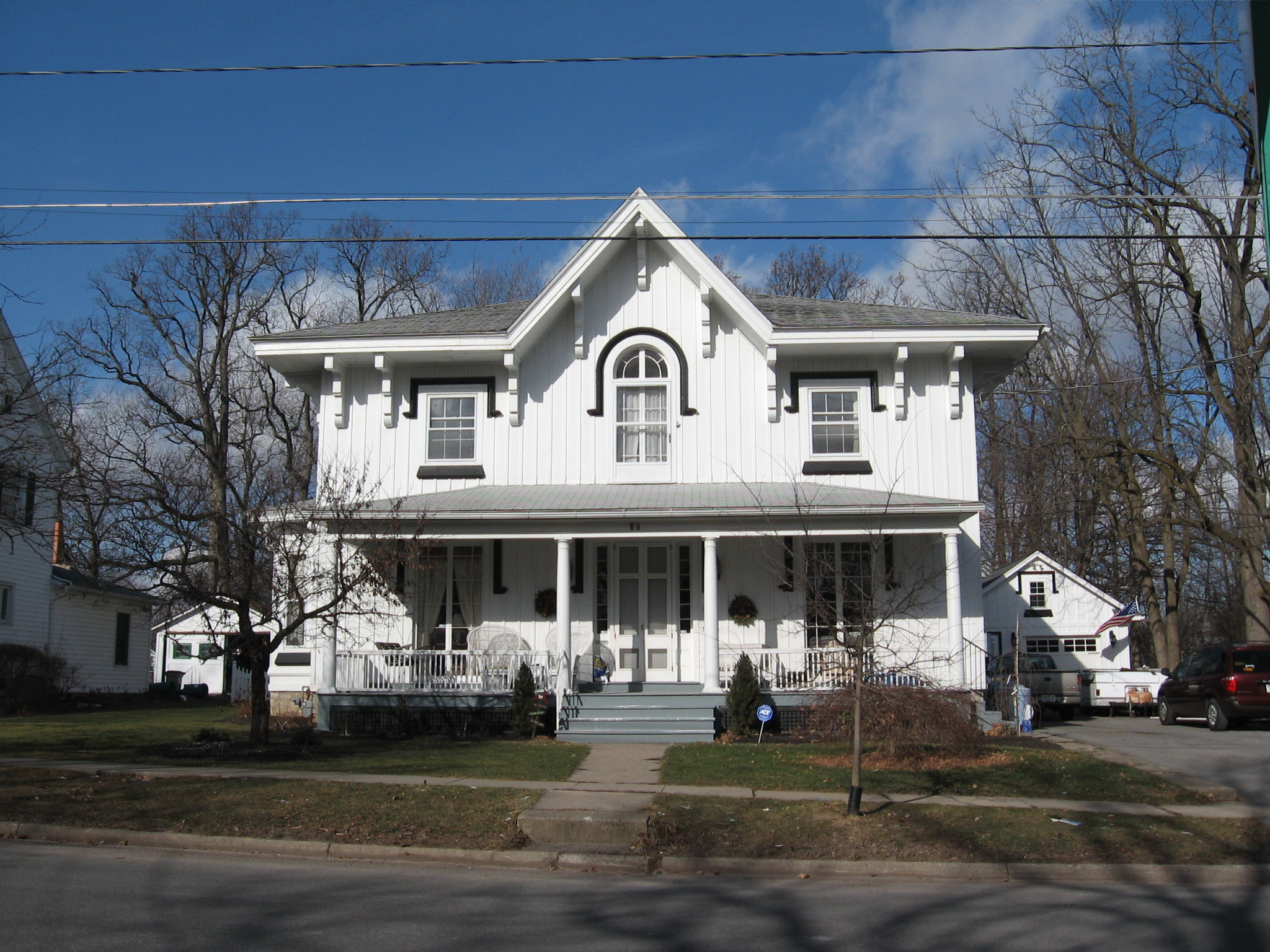
- Granger Cottage, January 2008

- Location within New York Location within the United States
- Location: 60 Granger St., Canandaigua, New York
- Coordinates: 42°34′22″N 77°16′26″W
- Area: less than one acre
- Built: 1850
- Architectural style: Colonial Revival, Gothic Revival
- MPS: Canandaigua MRA
- NRHP reference No.: 84002865
- Added to NRHP: April 26, 1984

Granger Cottage is a historic home located at Canandaigua in Ontario County, New York. It is a two-story, three-bay Gothic Revival style dwelling on a slightly raised cobblestone foundation. It was built in the 1850s. In 1907, the cottage was moved and a Colonial Revival style porch was added.

It was listed on the National Register of Historic Places in 1984.

== Gallery ==
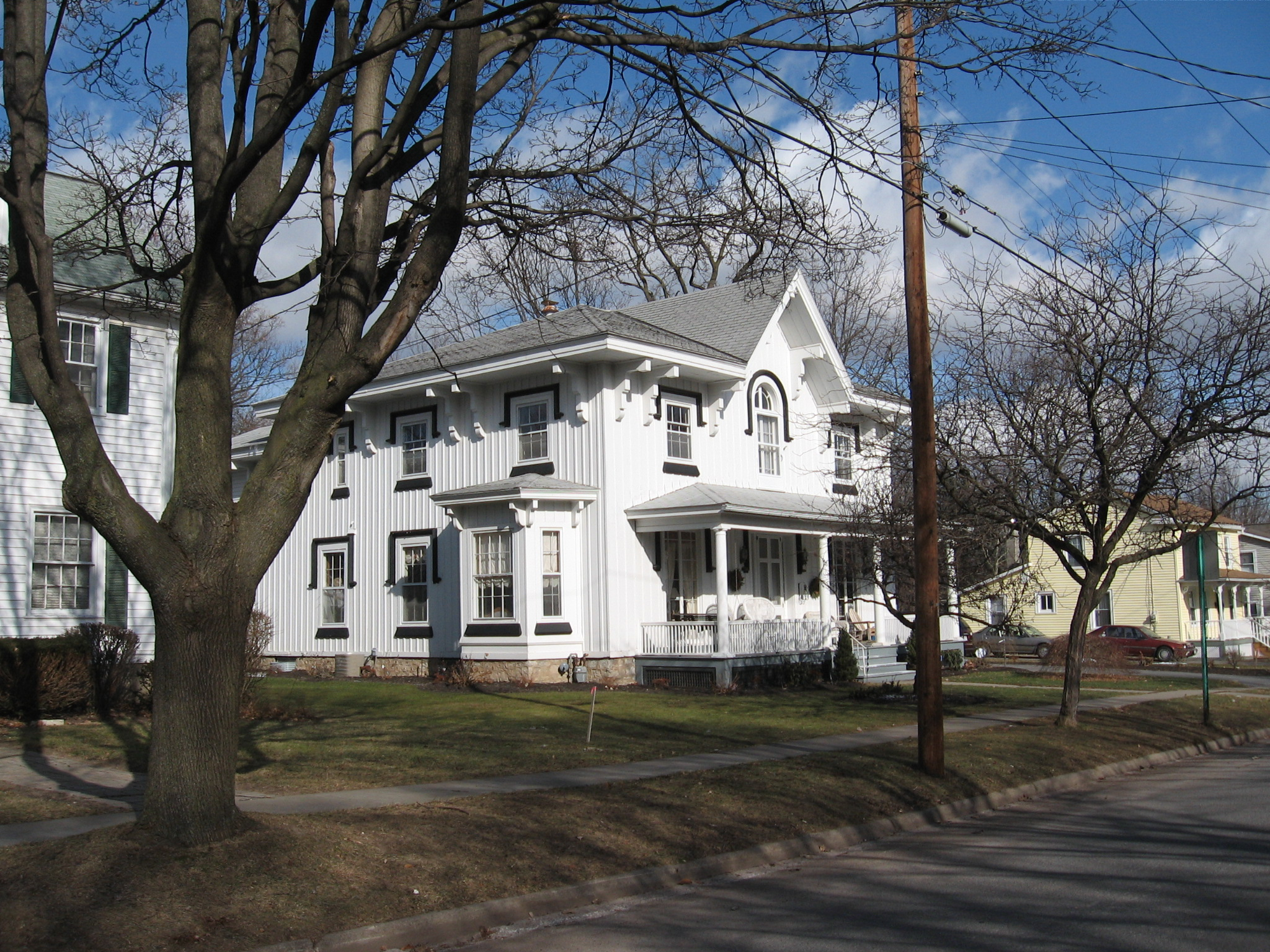
Granger Cottage
