= Saltonstall Street School =

- U.S. National Register of Historic Places
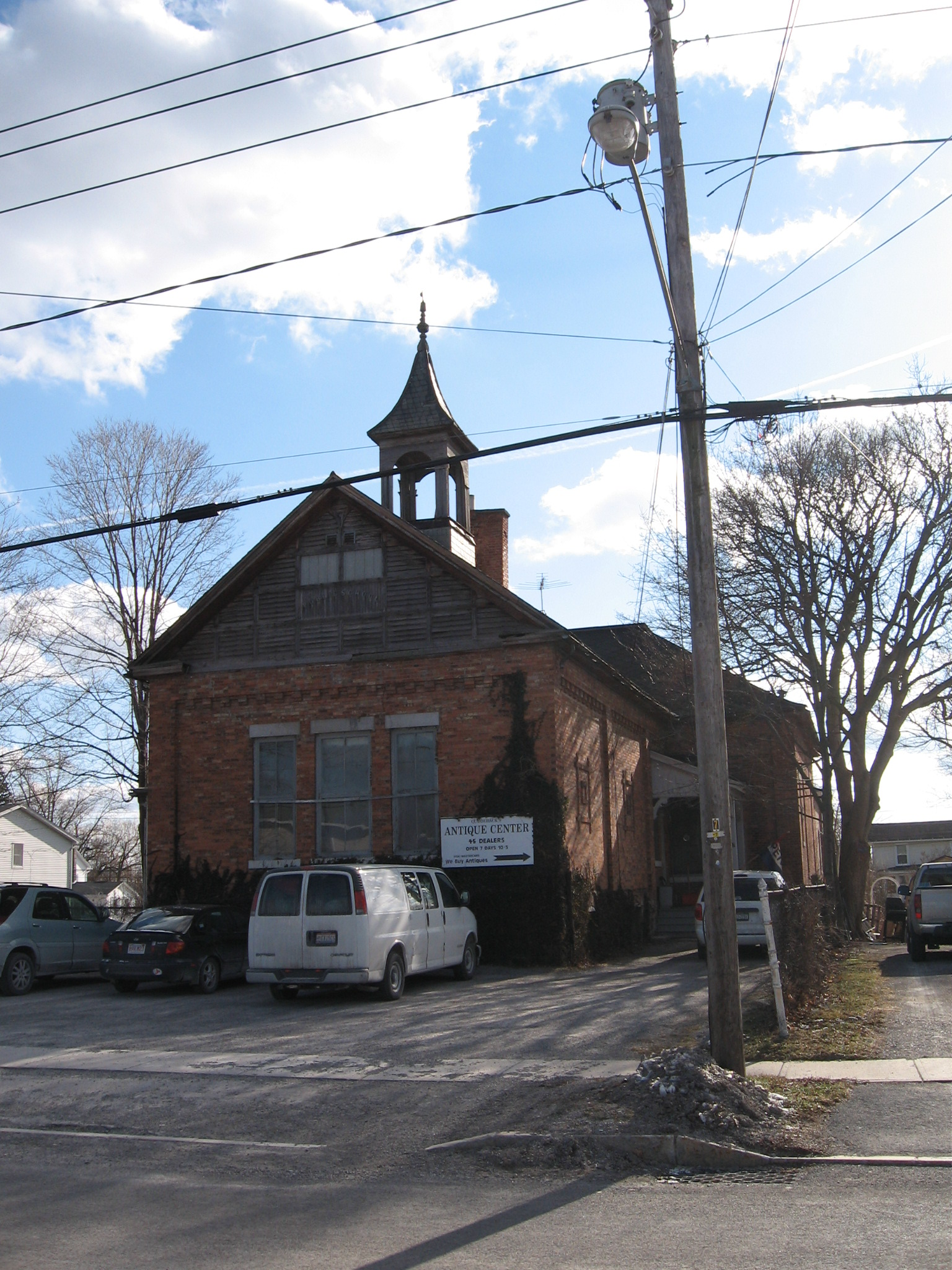

- Location within New York Location within the United States
- Location: 47 Saltonstall St., Canandaigua, New York
- Coordinates: 42°53′3″N 77°16′36″W
- Area: less than one acre
- Built: 1875
- Architect: Foote, Orlando K.; Ellis, Albion
- Architectural style: Queen Anne
- MPS: Canandaigua MRA
- NRHP reference No.: 84002877
- Added to NRHP: April 26, 1984

Saltonstall Street School is a historic school building located at Canandaigua in Ontario County, New York. The original section of the school was built in 1875, with a major addition constructed in 1890 and is a one-story, polychrome brick structure on a raised basement. It features a variety of picturesque late 19th century decorative features in the Queen Anne style, such as a multi-gabled roof surmounted by a louvred cupola. It is a typical example of a late 19th-century ward school, along with the Adelaide Avenue School.

It was listed on the National Register of Historic Places in 1984.
