= Adelaide Avenue School =

Historic building in New York, U.S.

- U.S. National Register of Historic Places
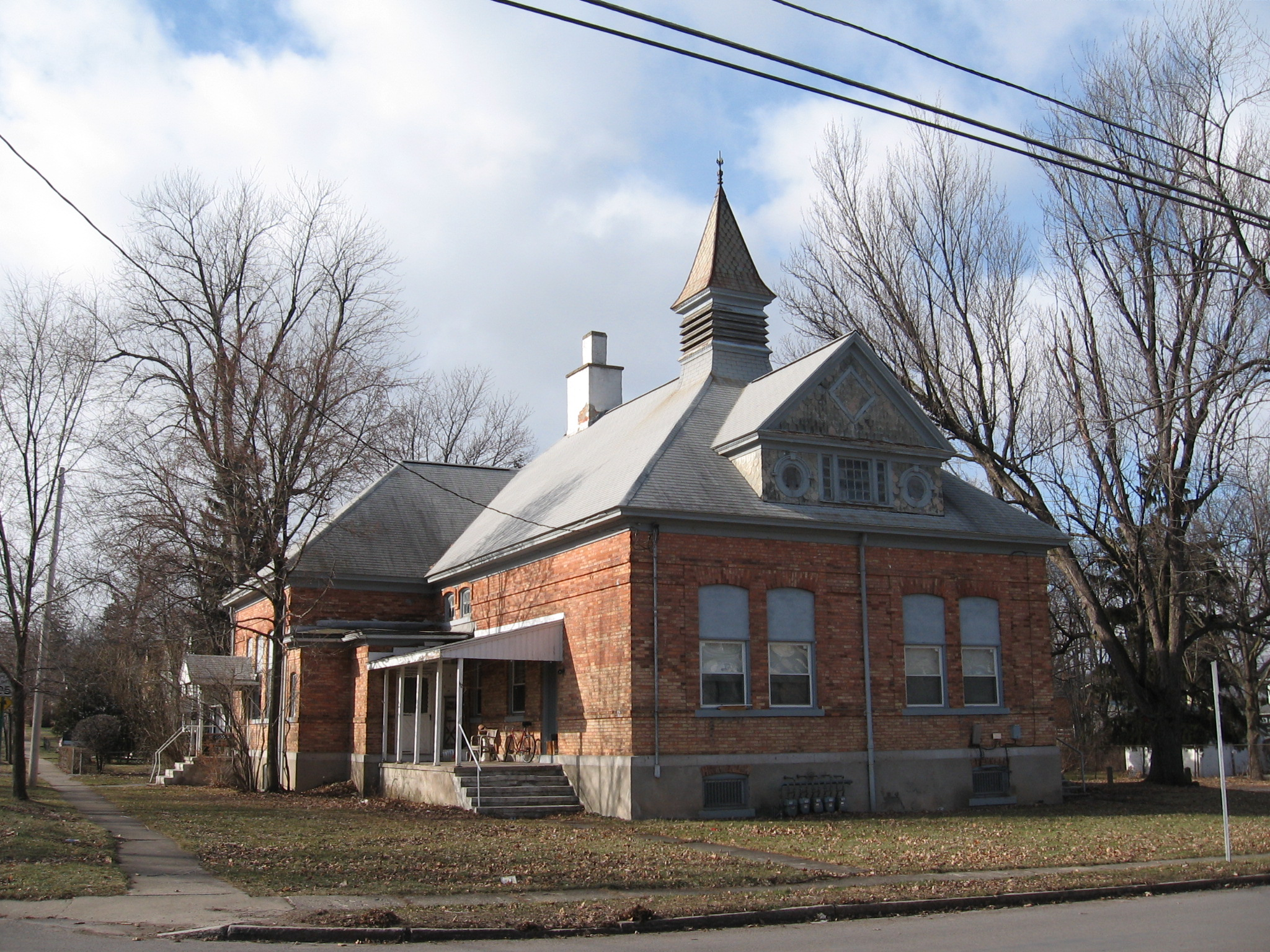
- Adelaide Avenue School, January 2008

- Location within New York Location within the United States
- Location: 108-116 Adelaide Ave., Canandaigua, New York
- Coordinates: 42°53′1″N 77°17′10″W
- Area: less than one acre
- Built: 1890
- Architect: Foote, Orlando K.
- Architectural style: Queen Anne
- MPS: Canandaigua MRA
- NRHP reference No.: 84002822
- Added to NRHP: April 26, 1984

Adelaide Avenue School is a historic school building located at Canandaigua in Ontario County, New York. It was built about 1890 and is a one-story, polychrome brick structure on a raised basement. It features a variety of picturesque late 19th century decorative features in the Queen Anne style, such as a multi-gabled roof surmounted by a louvred cupola. It is a typical example of a late 19th-century ward school, along with the Saltonstall Street School.

It was listed on the National Register of Historic Places in 1984.

== Gallery ==
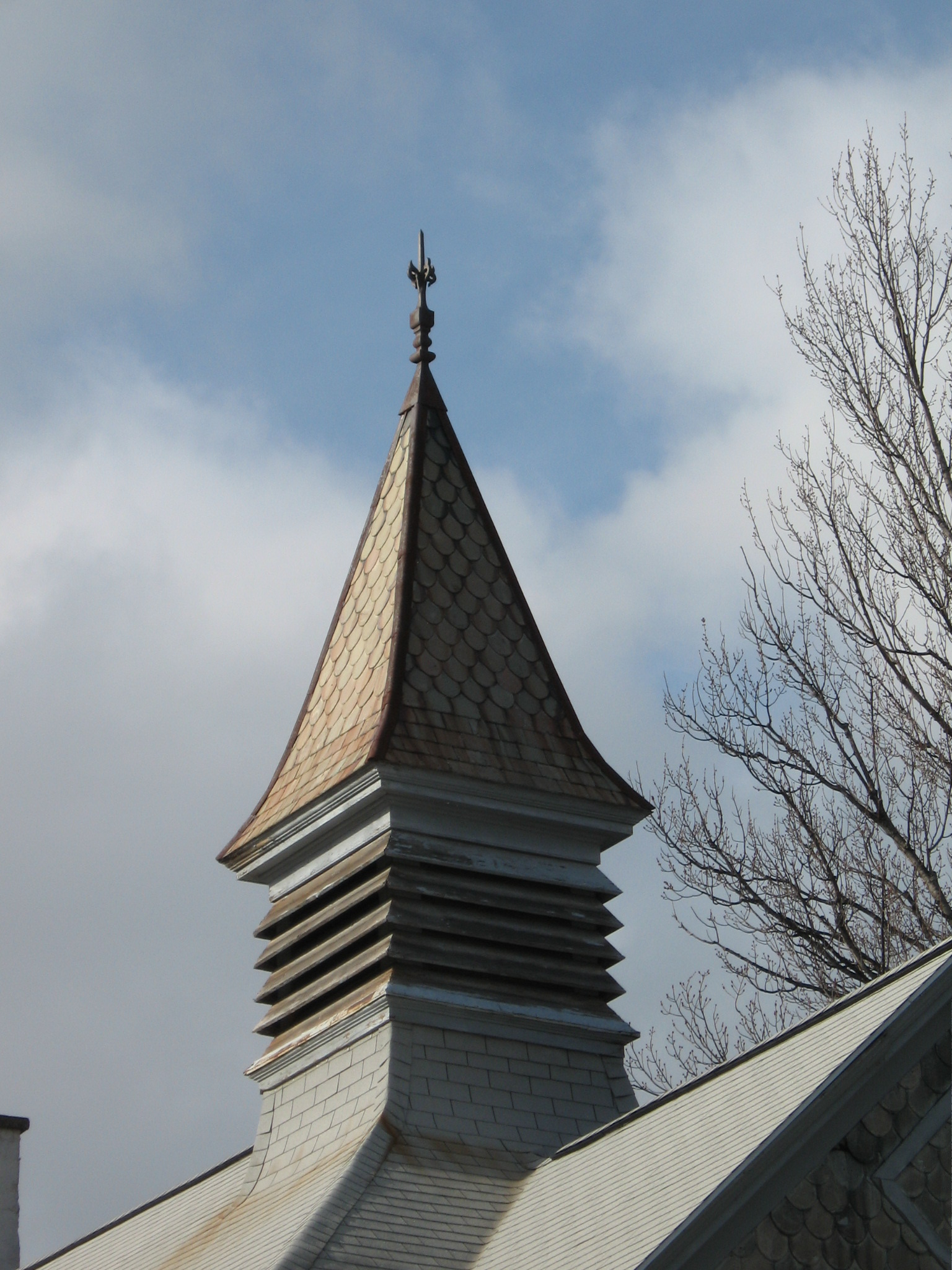
Louvred cupola

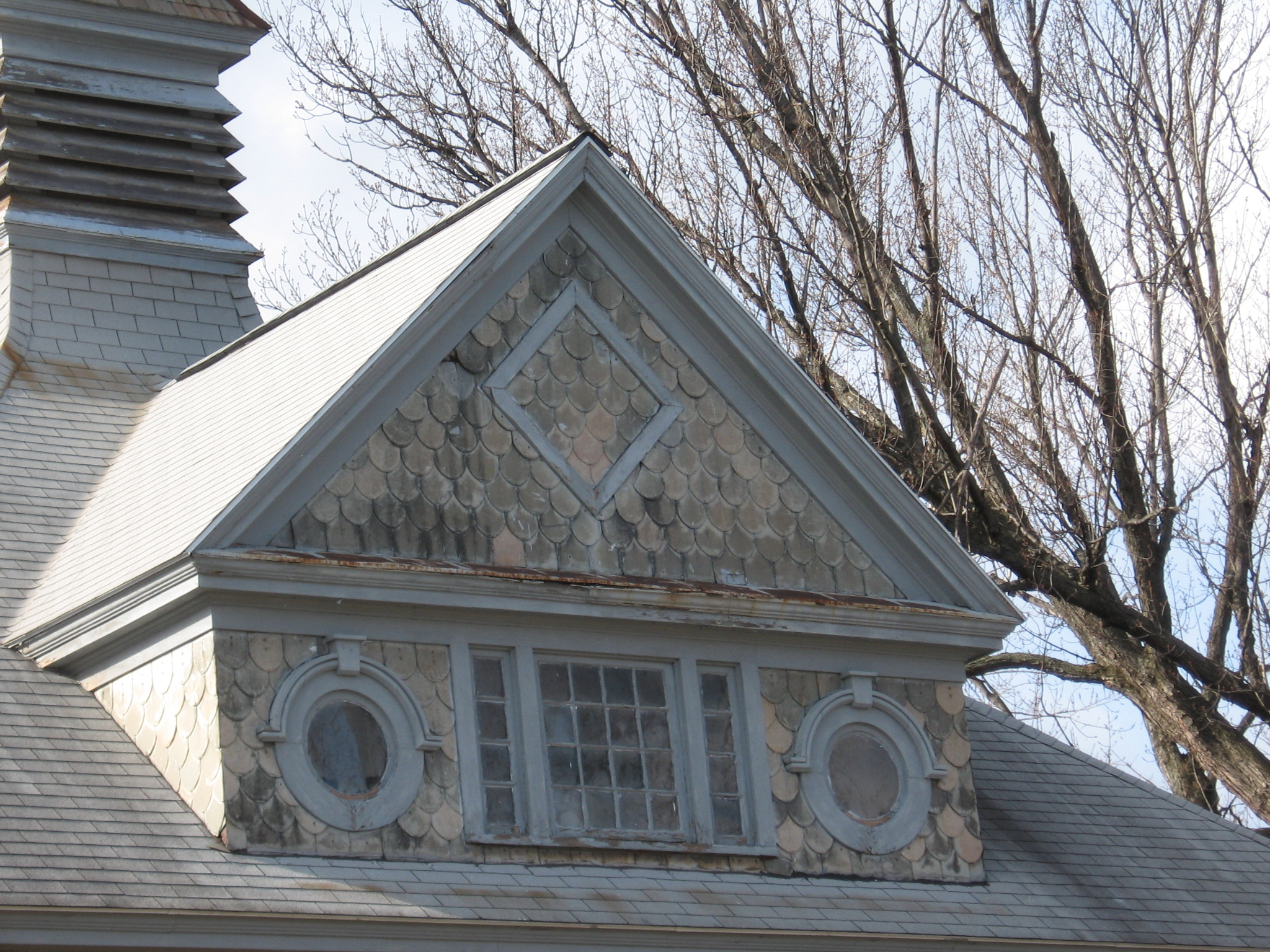
Roof gable
