= South Main Street Historic District (Geneva, New York) =

Historic district in New York, United States

- U.S. National Register of Historic Places
- U.S. Historic district
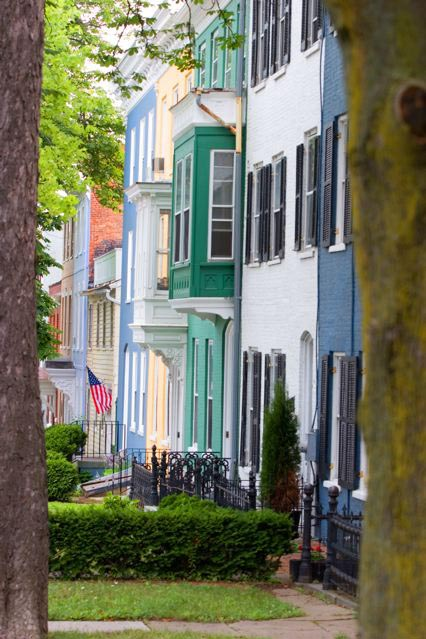
- South Main Street, June 2007

- Location within New York Location within the United States
- Location: Irregular pattern along S. Main St., Geneva, New York
- Coordinates: 42°51′27″N 76°58′59″W
- Area: 79 acres (32 ha)
- Built: 1800
- Architect: Multiple
- Architectural style: Late 19th And 20th Century Revivals, Greek Revival, Late Victorian
- NRHP reference No.: 74001286
- Added to NRHP: December 31, 1974

South Main Street Historic District is a national historic district located at Geneva in Ontario County, New York. The district contains 142 contributing properties including 140 contributing buildings, as well as Pultney Park and the original quadrangle of the Hobart College campus. Over half of the structures date from 1825 to 1850.

It was listed on the National Register of Historic Places in 1974.

== Gallery ==
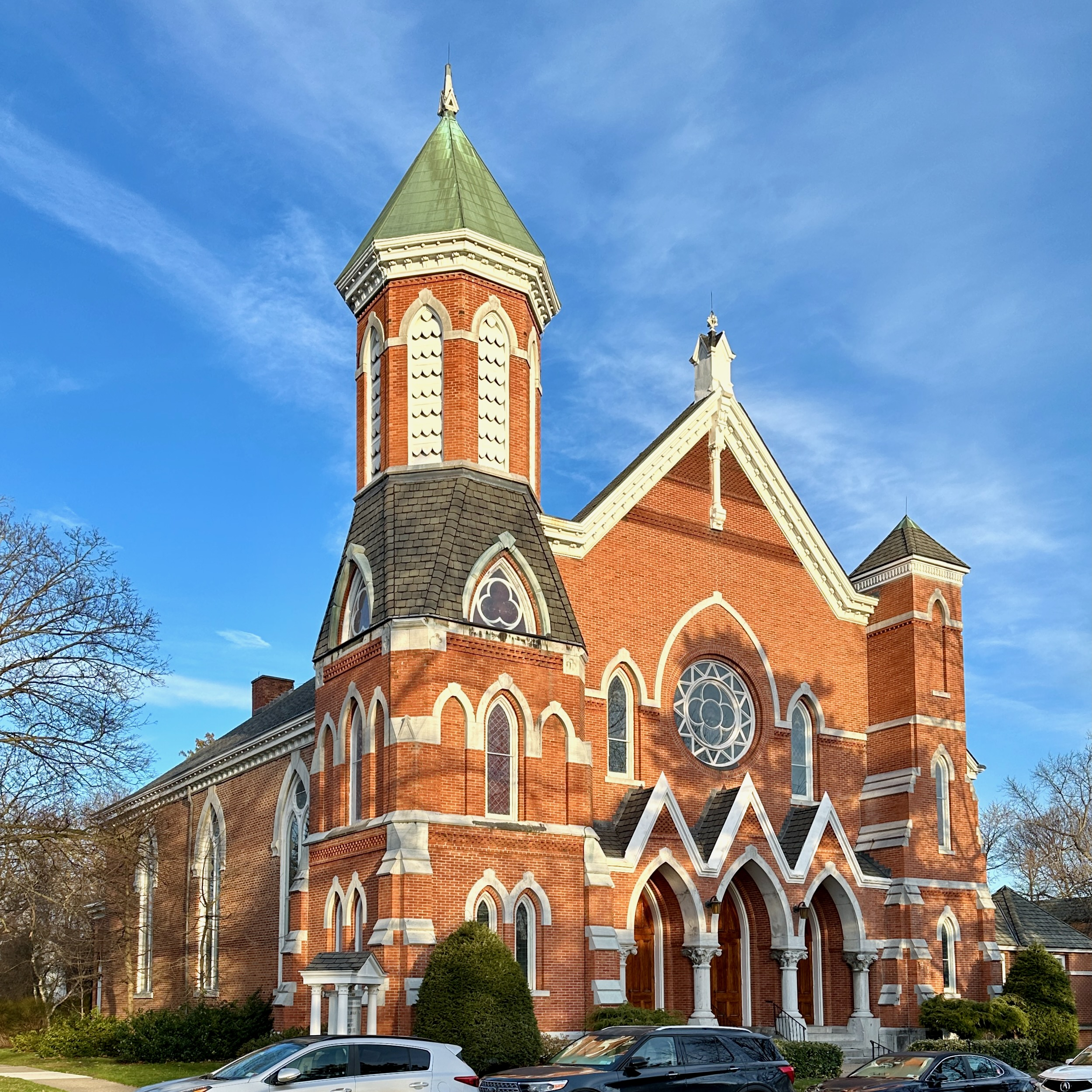
First Presbyterian Church
