= Osborne House (Victor, New York) =

Historic house in Victor, New York

- U.S. National Register of Historic Places
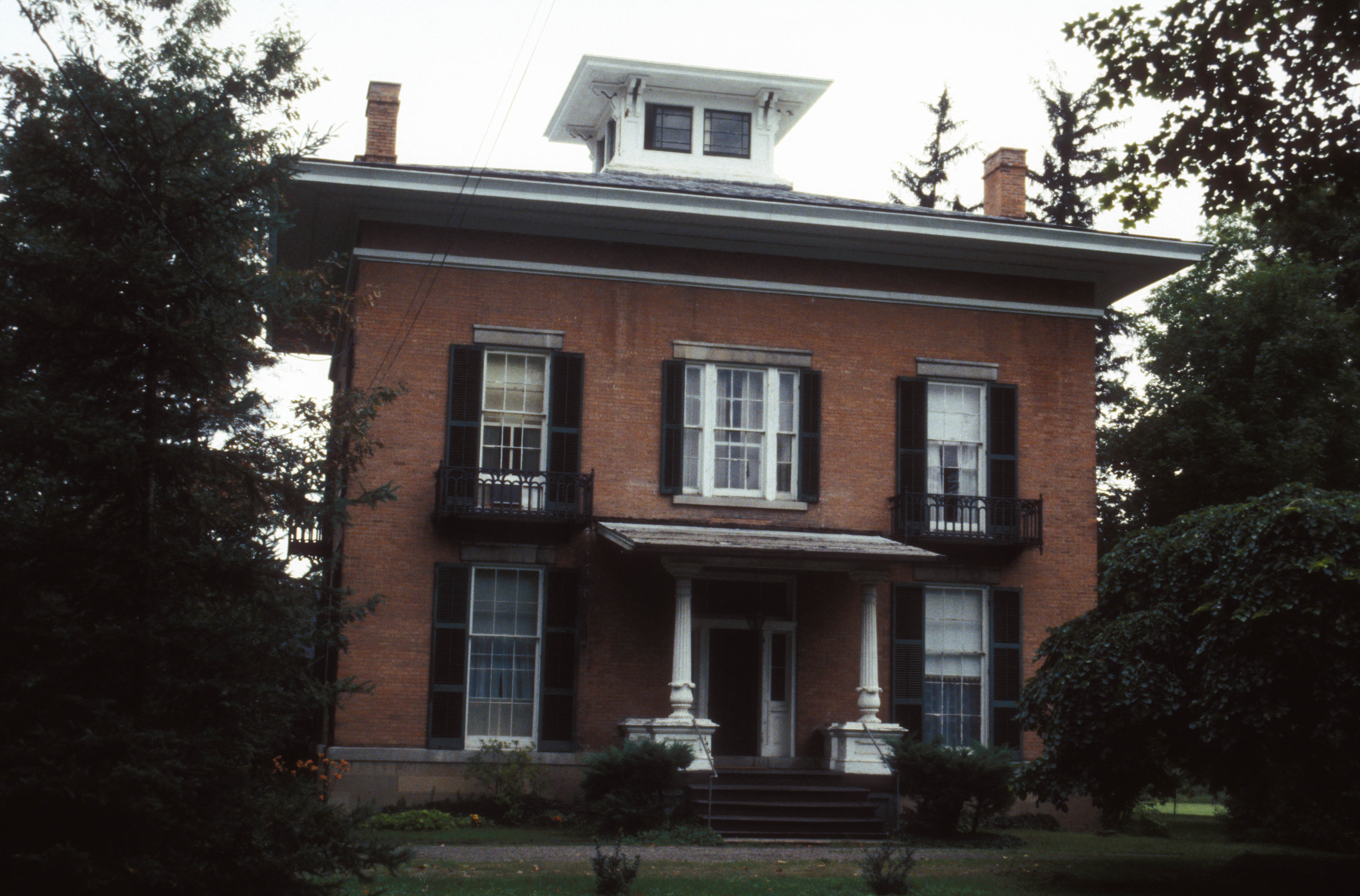

- Location within New York Location within the United States
- Location: 146 Maple Ave., Victor, New York
- Coordinates: 42°58′42″N 77°24′38″W
- Area: 1.3 acres (0.53 ha)
- Built: 1855
- Architect: Austin & Warner
- Architectural style: Italian Villa
- NRHP reference No.: 80002732
- Added to NRHP: July 11, 1980

Osborne House is a historic home located at Victor in Ontario County, New York, USA. It is a two story with full attic Italian Villa style dwelling built about 1855. Surmounting the hip roof is a notable cupola. Contributing structures on the property are a carriage barn, smokehouse, corn crib, and chicken house.

It was listed on the National Register of Historic Places in 1980.
