= Canandaigua Veterans Hospital Historic District =

Historic district in New York, United States

- U.S. National Register of Historic Places
- U.S. Historic district
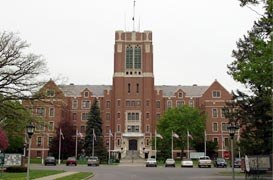
- Canandaigua Veterans Hospital, October 2006

- Location within New York Location within the United States
- Location: 400 Fort Hill Avenue, Canandaigua, New York
- Coordinates: 42°54′04″N 77°16′11″W
- Area: 123 acres (50 ha)
- Built: 1931-1950
- Architectural style: Tudor Revival, Jacobethan Revival
- MPS: United States Second Generation Veterans Hospitals Multiple Property Submission
- NRHP reference No.: 12000161
- Added to NRHP: March 27, 2012

Canandaigua Veterans Hospital Historic District is a historic hospital and national historic district located at Canandaigua in Ontario County, New York. The district includes 29 contributing buildings, two contributing sites, and four contributing structures. They were built or utilized during the period 1931 to 1950. The Veterans Administration opened the facility in 1933, as a veteran's neuropsychiatric hospital. The original hospital buildings built in 1932, include the main building, kitchen / dining hall, acute building, continued treatment building, recreation building, laundry, warehouse, boiler plant, attendant's quarters, sewage pump house, garage, and gatehouse. The buildings are constructed of brick and feature crenellation, gabled parapets, half-timbering, steeply gabled roofs, and Tudor arches reflective of the Tudor Revival and Jacobethan Revival styles.

It was added to the National Register of Historic Places in 2012.
