= St. Francis deSales Church (Geneva, New York) =

- St. Francis de Sales Parish Complex
- U.S. National Register of Historic Places
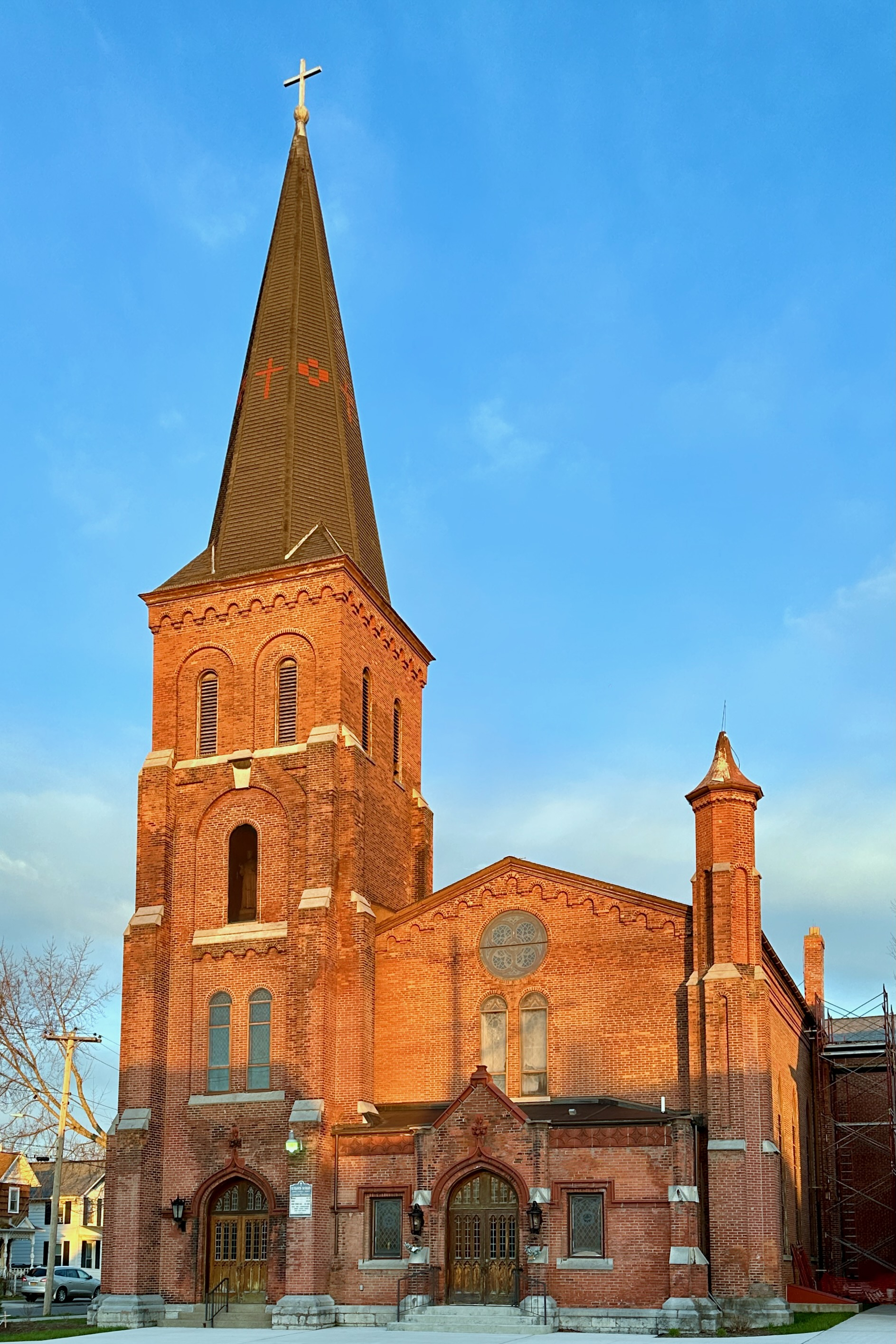
- Church building in 2024

- Location within New York
- Location: Geneva, New York
- Coordinates: 42.873265°N 76.979756°W
- Area: 2.3 acres (0.93 ha)
- NRHP reference No.: 15000514
- Added to NRHP: August 10, 2015

St. Francis deSales Church is a historic Catholic church in Geneva, New York. A historic district of the church and three associated buildings, designated St. Francis de Sales Parish Complex, was listed on the National Register of Historic Places in 2015.

== History ==
The parish was established in 1832. The current church was completed in 1864. The expansion of the complex over the following 10 years reflects the rapid growth of the city's Catholic population.

Since 2007, the church has been part of merged larger parish, the Our Lady of Peace parish, with two churches, the St. Francis de Sales and the St. Stephen Church at 48 Pulteney Street in Geneva.

== Architecture ==
The listing includes 94, 110, 130 & 140 Exchange St. in Geneva. These are the church, a rectory/church office, a former school, and a convent/office building.

According to its National Register nomination, the church is a large Gothic Revival building with some Romanesque details (rounded corbeling and rounded windows) and a large four stage steeple with a tall spire at the southeast end. The rectory is a two and one-half story brick Second Empire building built ca. 1868 with a mansard roof that was expanded in 1890. The school was also expanded; it was originally built in 1874 in the Italianate style and significantly enlarged in 1909, retaining the same detailing but removing a central bell tower. The convent to the school's north is a two and one-half story brick building built in 1874. It retains some Italianate features, but in 1910, a new roof, decorative features, entrance and a substantial rear expansion gave it the form and feeling of a Colonial Revival style building.
