= Brigham Hall =

- U.S. National Register of Historic Places
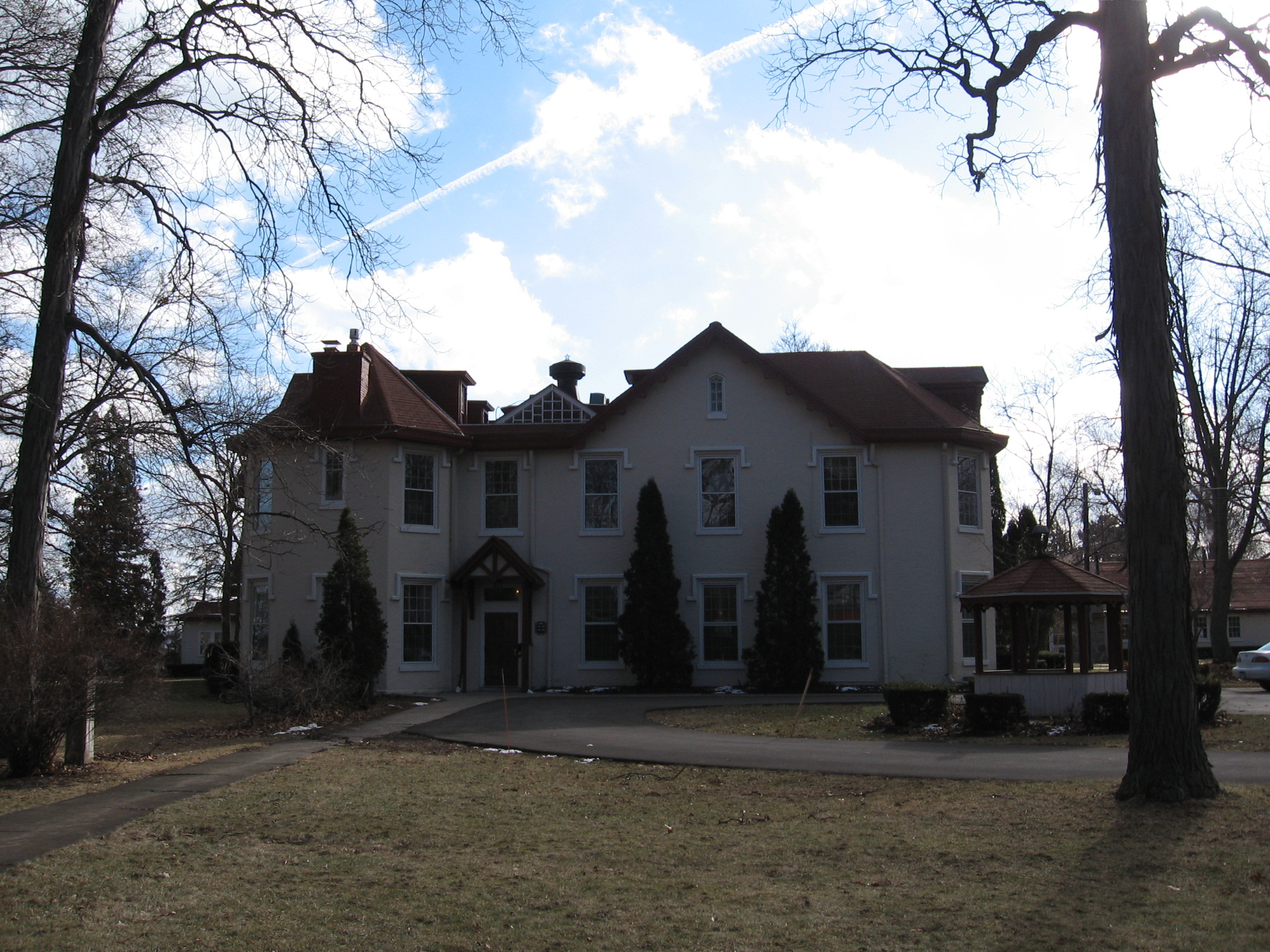
- Brigham Hall, January 2008

- Location within New York Location within the United States
- Interactive map showing the location of Brigham Hall
- Location: 229 Bristol St., Canandaigua, New York
- Coordinates: 42°52′45″N 77°17′23″W
- Area: 16 acres (6.5 ha)
- Built: 1855
- Architectural style: Gothic Revival
- MPS: Canandaigua MRA
- NRHP reference No.: 84002827
- Added to NRHP: September 29, 1984

Brigham Hall, also known as Grove Home, is a historic psychiatric hospital located at Canandaigua in Ontario County, New York. It is a complex of 10 buildings designed as a facility for the care and confinement of the mentally ill. The Gothic Revival style main building was built about 1855 and is surrounded by the contributing outbuildings. The central section is a 1 1/2- to 2-story brick and fieldstone structure, flanked by two-story brick wings. Other structures on the property are Heritage House (or George Cook Memorial Building), an early 20th-century residential unit; Female Unit #1 and Male Unit #2, also constructed in the early 20th century; a frame storage building; paint shop; cistern; gazebo; and Recreation Building, built between 1908 and 1924. By 1960 the complex was converted for use as a nursing home for the elderly.

It was listed on the National Register of Historic Places in 1984.
