= Genesee Park Historic District =

Historic district in New York, United States

- U.S. National Register of Historic Places
- U.S. Historic district
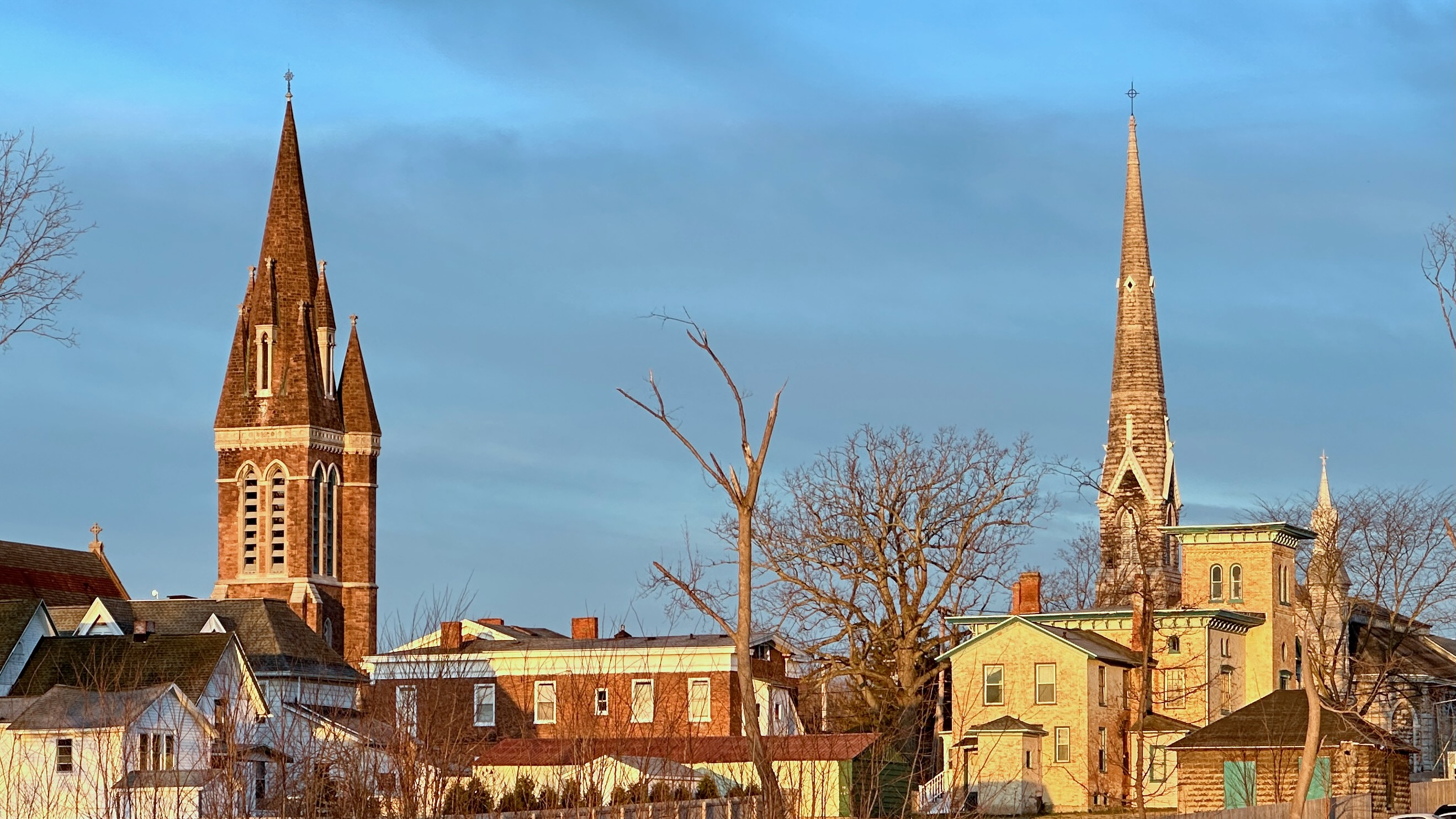
- Church steeples in 2024

- Location within New York Location within the United States
- Location: Genesee Park, Genesee Park Place, and Genesee and Lewis Streets, Geneva, New York
- Coordinates: 42°52′16″N 76°59′2″W
- Area: 12 acres (4.9 ha)
- Architectural style: Mid 19th Century Revival, Late Victorian
- NRHP reference No.: 02001117
- Added to NRHP: October 10, 2002

Genesee Park Historic District is a national historic district located at Geneva in Ontario County, New York. The district contains 16 contributing properties including 14 contributing buildings, one contributing site, and one contributing object. The focal point is Genesee Park, an informally landscaped village green. The district includes a remarkably intact collection of mid- to late-19th century civic, domestic, and religious properties. There are two notable churches: the massive St. Peter's Episcopal Church (1868), designed by Richard Upjohn, and the former North Presbyterian Church (1875), both examples of the Gothic Revival style.

It was listed on the National Register of Historic Places in 2002.

== Gallery ==
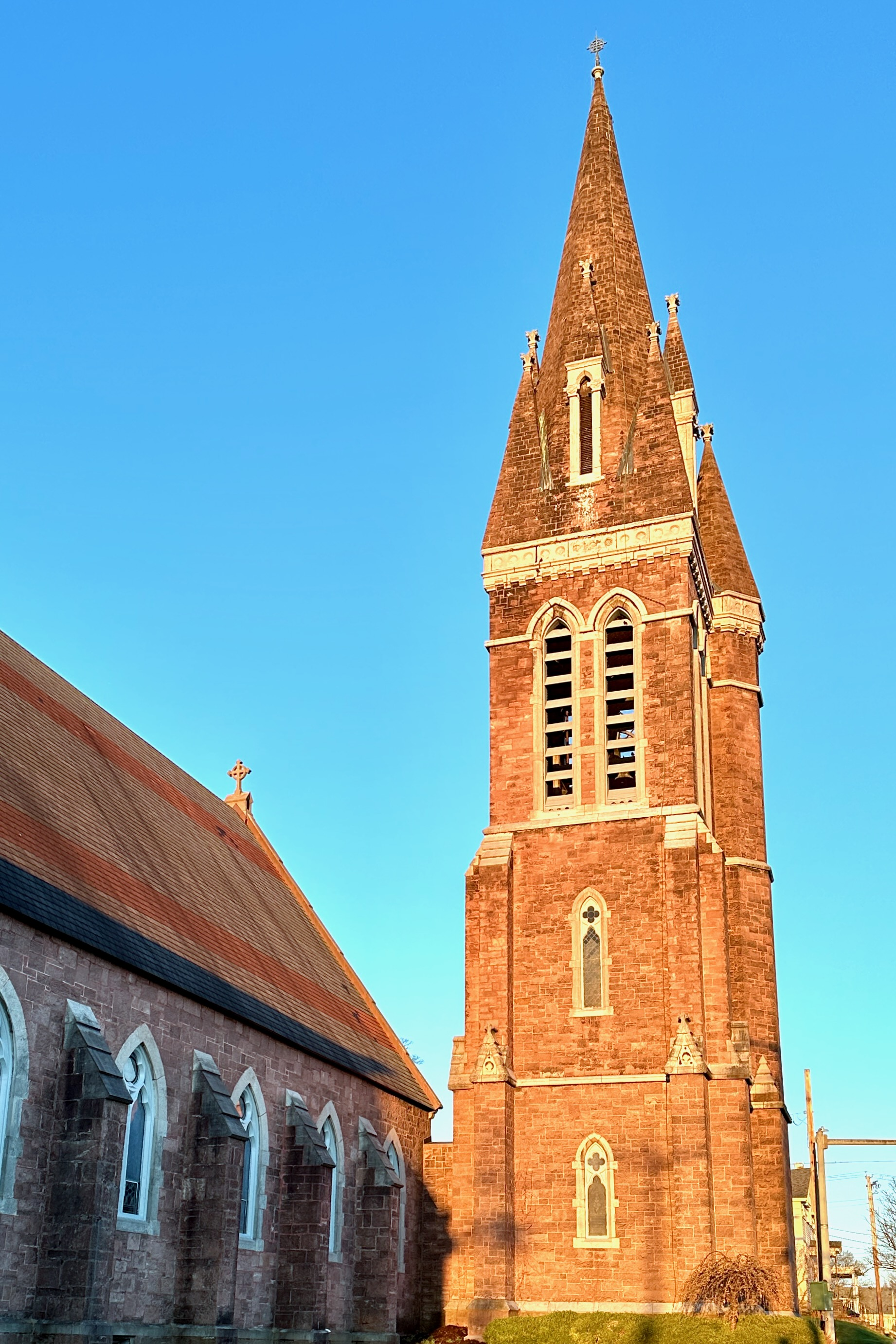
St. Peter's Episcopal Church

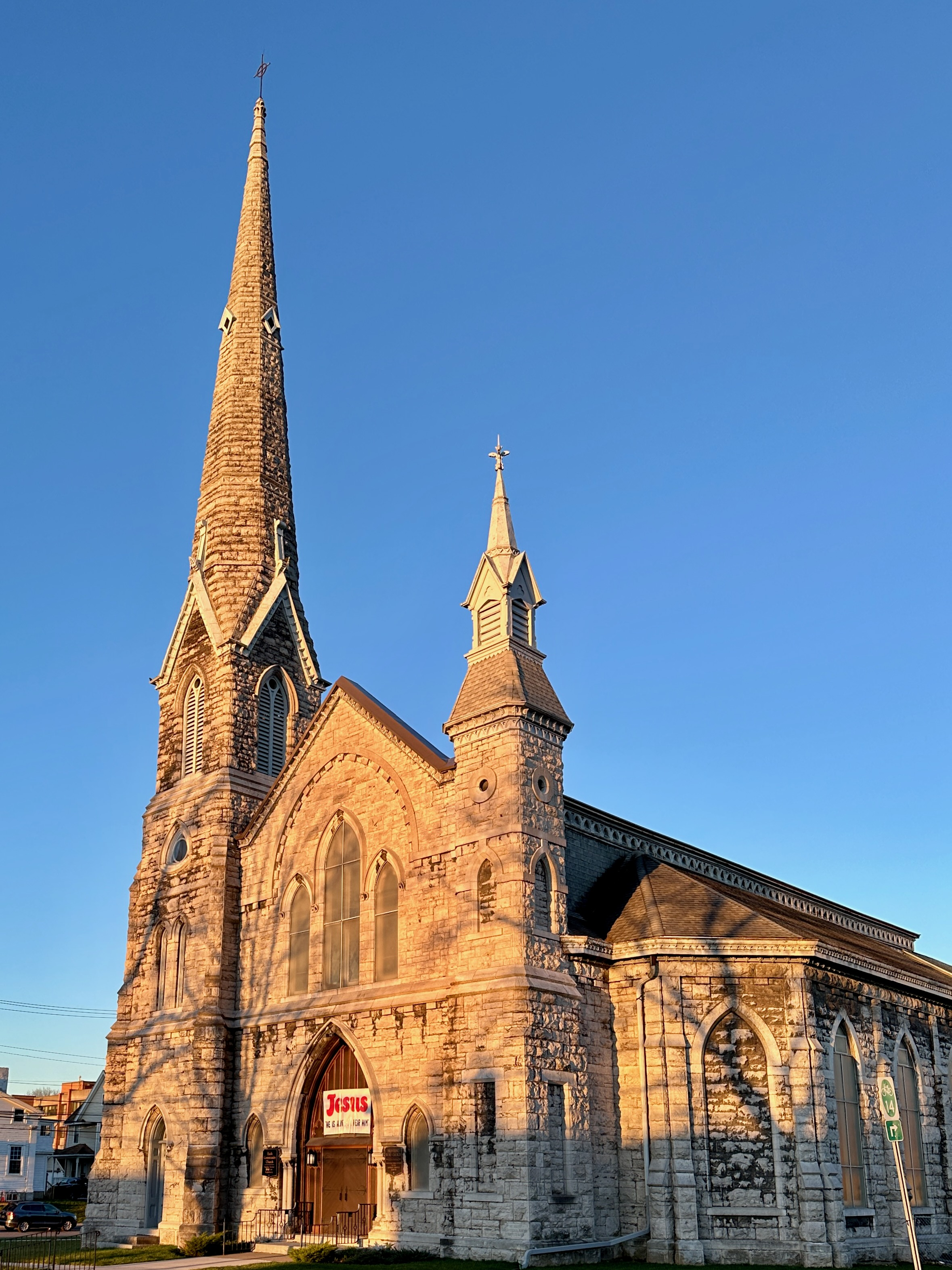
North Presbyterian Church
