= Canandaigua, New York =

City in Ontario County, New York, US

Canandaigua Tganödä:gwëh (Seneca)
- City
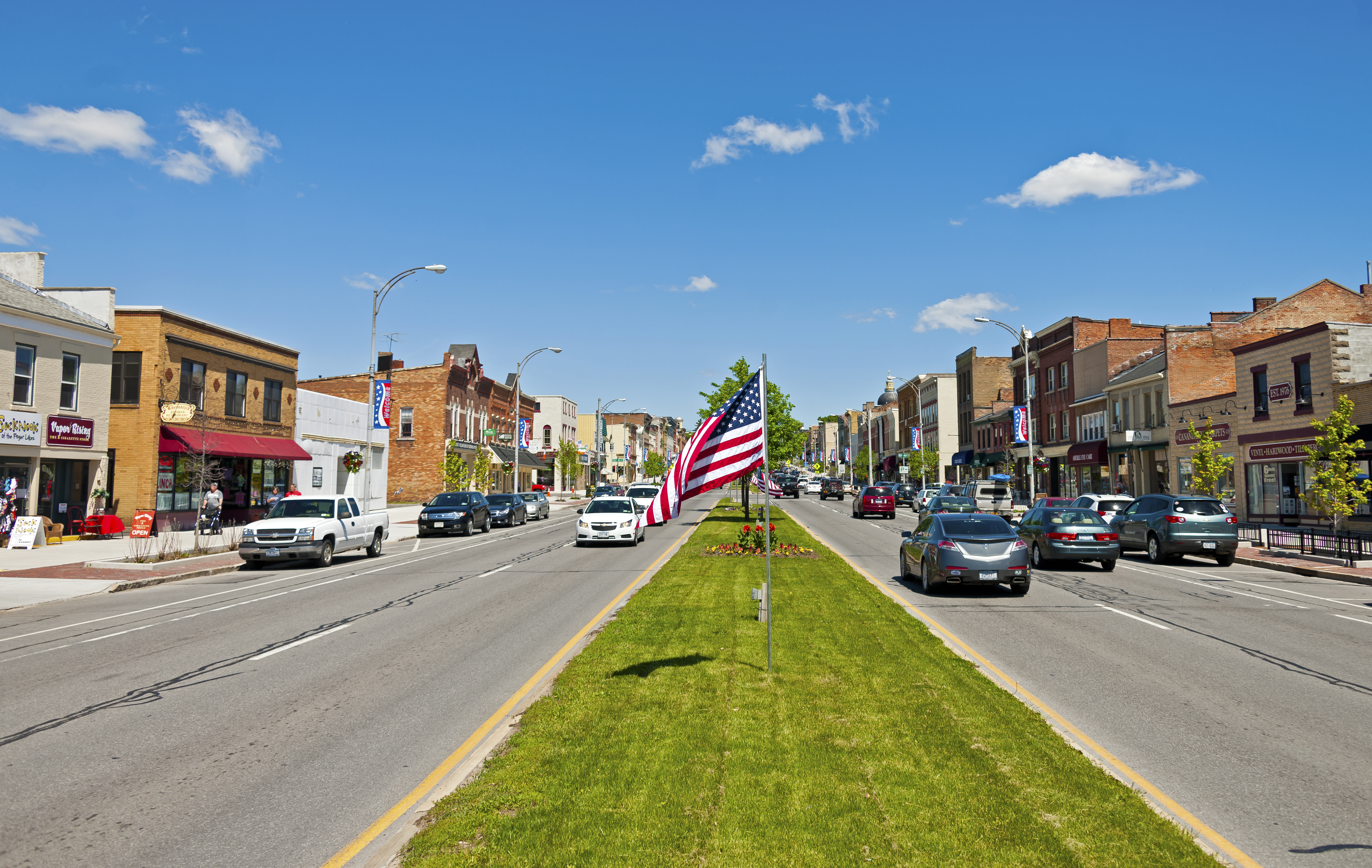
- View north along Main Street, 2014

- Location of Canandaigua in New York state
- Coordinates: 42°53′15″N 77°16′54″W
- Country: United States
- State: New York
- County: Ontario
- Incorporation as village: 1815; 211 years ago
- Incorporation as city: 1913; 113 years ago

Government
  - Type: Council–Manager
  - Mayor: Thomas Lyon (D)
  - City Manager: John Goodwin

Area
  - Total: 4.83 sq mi (12.50 km^{2})
  - Land: 4.56 sq mi (11.81 km^{2})
  - Water: 0.27 sq mi (0.69 km^{2})
- Elevation: 750 ft (230 m)
- Lowest elevation: 690 ft (210 m)

Population (2020)
  - Total: 10,576
  - Density: 2,319.1/sq mi (895.41/km^{2})
- Time zone: UTC−5 (Eastern (EST))
  - Summer (DST): UTC−4 (Eastern Daylight Time)
- ZIP Code: 14424
- Area code: 585
- FIPS code: 36-069-12144
- FIPS code: 36-12144
- GNIS feature ID: 0945739
- Wikimedia Commons: Canandaigua (city), New York
- Website: City of Canandaigua

Canandaigua (/ˌkænənˈdeɪɡwə/ KAN-ən-DAY-gwə; Seneca: Tganödä:gwëh) is a city in Ontario County, New York, United States. Its population was 10,576 at the 2020 census. This city is part of the Rochester metropolitan area. It is the county seat of Ontario County; some administrative offices are at the county complex in the adjacent town of Hopewell.

The city is surrounded by the Town of Canandaigua. The City of Canandaigua is on the northern end of Canandaigua Lake, one of the Finger Lakes, 24 miles (39 km) southeast of Rochester, 68 miles (109 km) west of Syracuse, and 93 miles (150 km) east of Buffalo. Canandaigua is part of the Greater Rochester area and is Rochester’s southernmost suburb.

== History ==
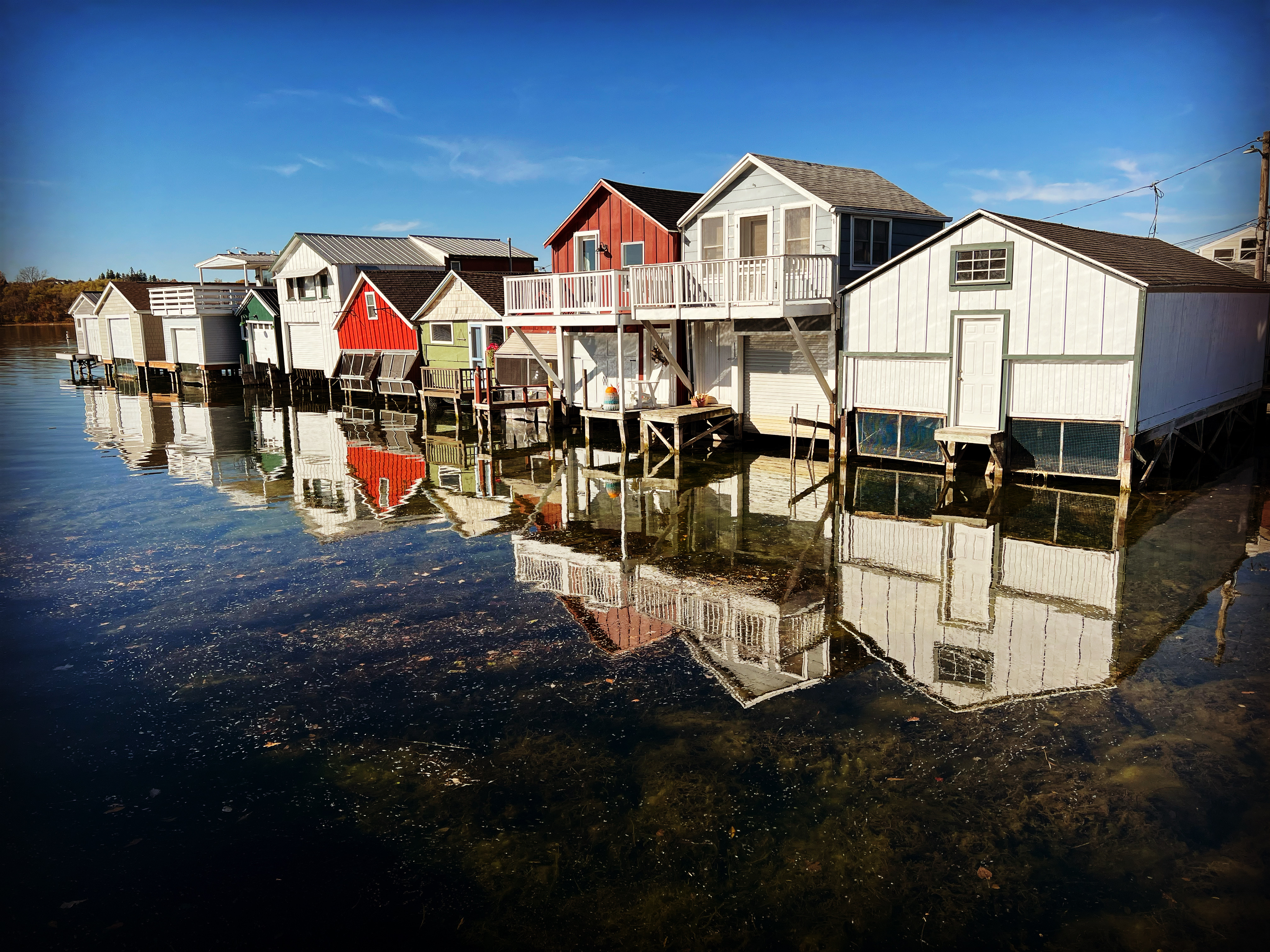
Boathouses along Canandaigua Lake city pier

=== Overview ===
Developed near Canandaigua Lake at the site of the historic Seneca village of Tganödä:gwëh, by the mid-19th century Canandaigua was an important railroad junction and home port for several steamboats that operated on the lake. After the Civil War, local industries included two brick works, the Lisk Manufacturing Company, several mills, and the regionally prominent McKechnie Brewery. The shire town of the original county of western New York, Canandaigua was the site of the trial of Susan B. Anthony in 1873 on charges of voting illegally because only men were allowed to vote.

In the 21st century, the town is a center for business, government, health care, and education. Canandaigua is the original home of Constellation Brands, founded as Canandaigua Wine Company, which produces Manischewitz wine; Finger Lakes Community College; Thompson Health System; the Constellation Brands – Marvin Sands Performing Arts Center (CMAC); Granger Homestead; the Canandaigua Lady paddle-wheel tour boat; and Sonnenberg Gardens and Mansion State Historic Park.

=== Chronological ===
French explorers Robert de La Salle and René de Bréhant de Galinée visited the region in 1669. They recorded seeing a burning spring known to the Seneca in what is now known as the nearby Town of Bristol. The water of the spring appears to burn as a flame; this is caused by escaping natural gas, and several such burning springs have been noted in the Canandaigua area.

The city was the historic site of Tganödä:gwëh, a Seneca village. The village site was later used for West Avenue Cemetery. The village was formed by former residents of the Ganondagan Seneca village, destroyed by the French in 1687.

The Tganödä:gwëh Seneca village, consisting of 23 longhouses, was destroyed during the American Revolutionary War by the Sullivan Expedition on September 10, 1779. American rebels had mounted this attack in reprisal for an attack by Mohawk and other British allies on Cherry Valley in the eastern part of the territory. The American forces attacked Iroquois villages throughout western New York, destroying 40 and burning the winter stores of the people. The Iroquois fled to Fort Niagara as refugees, and many died of starvation that winter.

After the war, pioneer settlers came from eastern New York and New England. They founded the city's public high school, Canandaigua Academy, in 1791. On November 11, 1794, the Treaty of Canandaigua was signed in the town by representatives of the United States of America and the Six Nations of the Iroquois; the British had ceded Iroquois lands without consulting them, and the US forced most of the Iroquois Native Americans out of the state. It established two small reservations for the Seneca and Oneida, who had been allies of the American rebels, but they suffered considerable enmity and discrimination after the war.

What is now the city separated from the Town of Canandaigua to become the Village of Canandaigua in 1815 and a city in 1913.

In 1807–1808, Jesse Hawley, a flour merchant from Geneva, served 20 months in the Canandaigua debtors' prison. He was an early proponent of building a canal through the Mohawk Valley to improve shipping and connect the Hudson River with Lake Erie. During his time in prison, he published 14 influential essays on the canal concept.

Stephen A. Douglas was a student at Canandaigua Academy between 1830 and January 1833; he later moved west and was elected as US senator from Illinois. He was the 1860 Democratic Party presidential nominee, losing to Republican Abraham Lincoln.

This area of New York was a center of activism for women's suffrage and other progressive movements. In 1873, the Ontario County Courthouse, located in the City of Canandaigua, was the site of the trial of Susan B. Anthony, a leader of the women's suffrage movement, who was arrested for voting at a time when only men were allowed to vote. She was found guilty and fined $100, which she did not pay.

John Willys, born in Canandaigua in 1873, operated a bicycle sales and repair shop there, before later becoming a successful automobile manufacturer.

On October 30, 1900, Theodore Roosevelt made a brief stop in Canandaigua to give a campaign speech at Atwater Park.

In 1945, Marvin Sands founded Canandaigua Wine Company. With a growing American market for wine in the late 20th century, the company expanded rapidly through acquisitions in the 1980s and 1990s. It joined other companies in forming Constellation Brands. In 2006, Canandaigua Wine Company rebranded as Centerra Wine Co., a subsidiary of Constellation Wines, U.S., Inc.

On March 14, 2006, President George W. Bush visited Canandaigua, giving speeches at Canandaigua Academy and Ferris Hills, an independent residential living community for seniors. He was describing Medicare Part D for senior citizens. The text of his speech at Ferris Hills can be found here.

== Geography ==
According to the United States Census Bureau, Canandaigua has an area of 4.8 square miles (12.5 km^{2}), of which 4.6 square miles (11.9 km^{2}) are land and 0.2 square mile (0.6 km^{2}) (4.75%) is covered by water.

The city is at the northern end of Canandaigua Lake, in the Finger Lakes region, the largest wine-producing area in New York.

The city is on U.S. Route 20 and NY Routes 5 and 21.

=== Climate ===
Köppen Dfa, hot summer humid continental climate.

Climate data for Canandaigua (1991–2020 normals, extremes 1944–present)
Month	Jan	Feb	Mar	Apr	May	Jun	Jul	Aug	Sep	Oct	Nov	Dec	Year
Record high °F (°C)	74 (23)	74 (23)	85 (29)	89 (32)	93 (34)	96 (36)	100 (38)	101 (38)	98 (37)	89 (32)	84 (29)	72 (22)	101 (38)
Mean daily maximum °F (°C)	33.0 (0.6)	34.6 (1.4)	42.2 (5.7)	55.2 (12.9)	68.2 (20.1)	76.9 (24.9)	81.4 (27.4)	80.2 (26.8)	73.5 (23.1)	60.8 (16.0)	48.7 (9.3)	38.1 (3.4)	57.7 (14.3)
Daily mean °F (°C)	25.4 (−3.7)	26.5 (−3.1)	33.5 (0.8)	45.3 (7.4)	57.5 (14.2)	66.9 (19.4)	71.7 (22.1)	70.4 (21.3)	63.6 (17.6)	51.9 (11.1)	41.1 (5.1)	31.4 (−0.3)	48.8 (9.3)
Mean daily minimum °F (°C)	17.8 (−7.9)	18.4 (−7.6)	24.9 (−3.9)	35.3 (1.8)	46.8 (8.2)	56.9 (13.8)	62.0 (16.7)	60.6 (15.9)	53.8 (12.1)	43.0 (6.1)	33.4 (0.8)	24.6 (−4.1)	39.8 (4.3)
Record low °F (°C)	−17 (−27)	−17 (−27)	−10 (−23)	10 (−12)	25 (−4)	34 (1)	41 (5)	40 (4)	31 (−1)	22 (−6)	5 (−15)	−12 (−24)	−17 (−27)
Average precipitation inches (mm)	1.92 (49)	1.77 (45)	2.65 (67)	3.21 (82)	3.13 (80)	3.58 (91)	4.06 (103)	3.31 (84)	3.12 (79)	3.46 (88)	2.59 (66)	2.39 (61)	35.19 (894)
Average precipitation days (≥ 0.01 in)	16.4	13.7	14.2	14.4	12.6	12.4	11.9	11.4	11.5	15.2	13.6	15.3	162.6
Source: NOAA

== Demographics ==
Historical population
Census	Pop.	Note	%±
1810	450		—
1830	1,830		—
1840	2,790		52.5%
1850	3,200		14.7%
1860	4,822		50.7%
1870	4,862		0.8%
1880	5,726		17.8%
1890	5,868		2.5%
1900	6,151		4.8%
1910	7,217		17.3%
1920	7,299		1.1%
1930	7,541		3.3%
1940	8,321		10.3%
1950	8,332		0.1%
1960	9,370		12.5%
1970	10,488		11.9%
1980	10,419		−0.7%
1990	10,725		2.9%
2000	11,264		5.0%
2010	10,545		−6.4%
2020	10,576		0.3%
U.S. Decennial Census

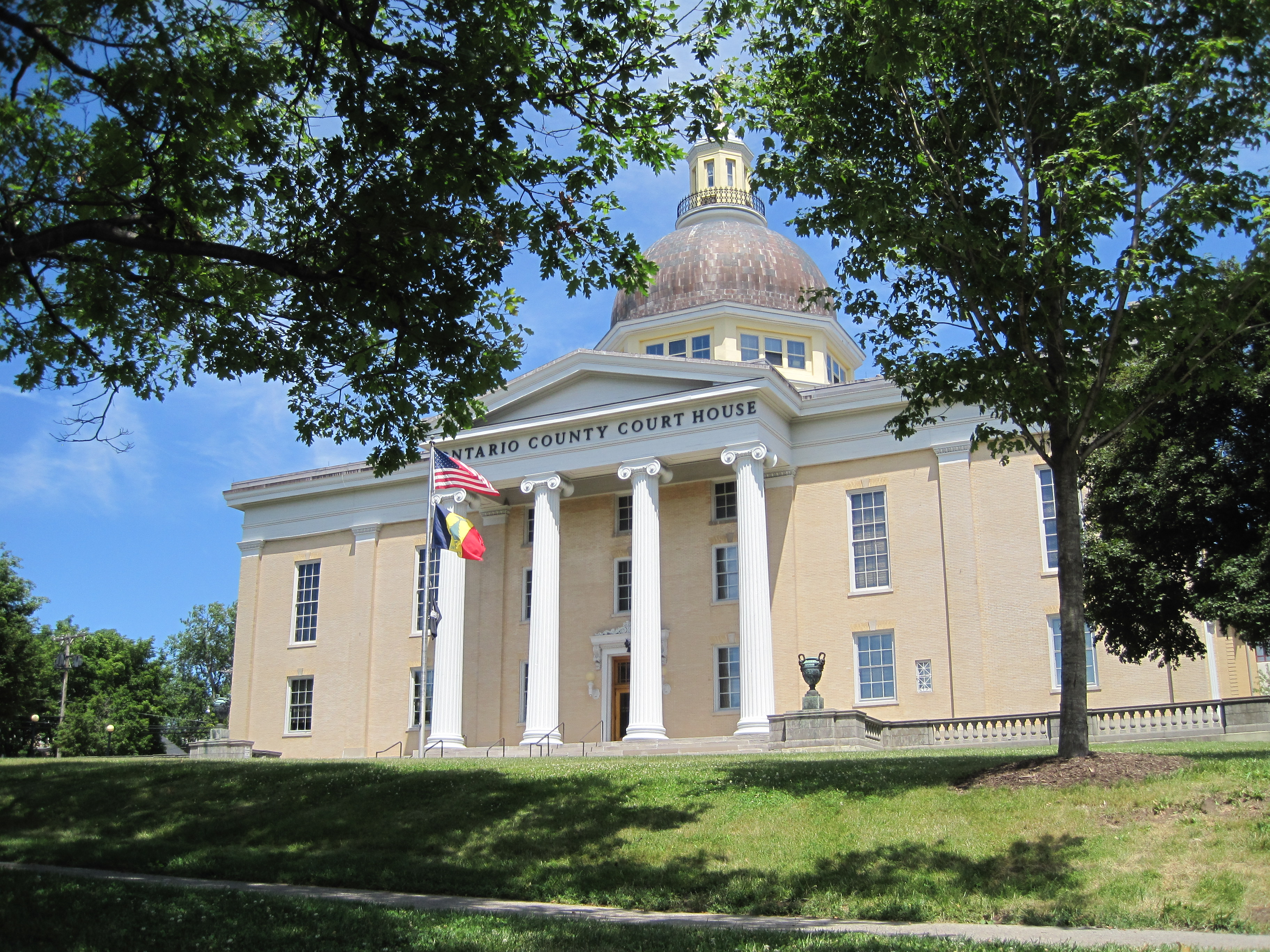
Ontario County Courthouse

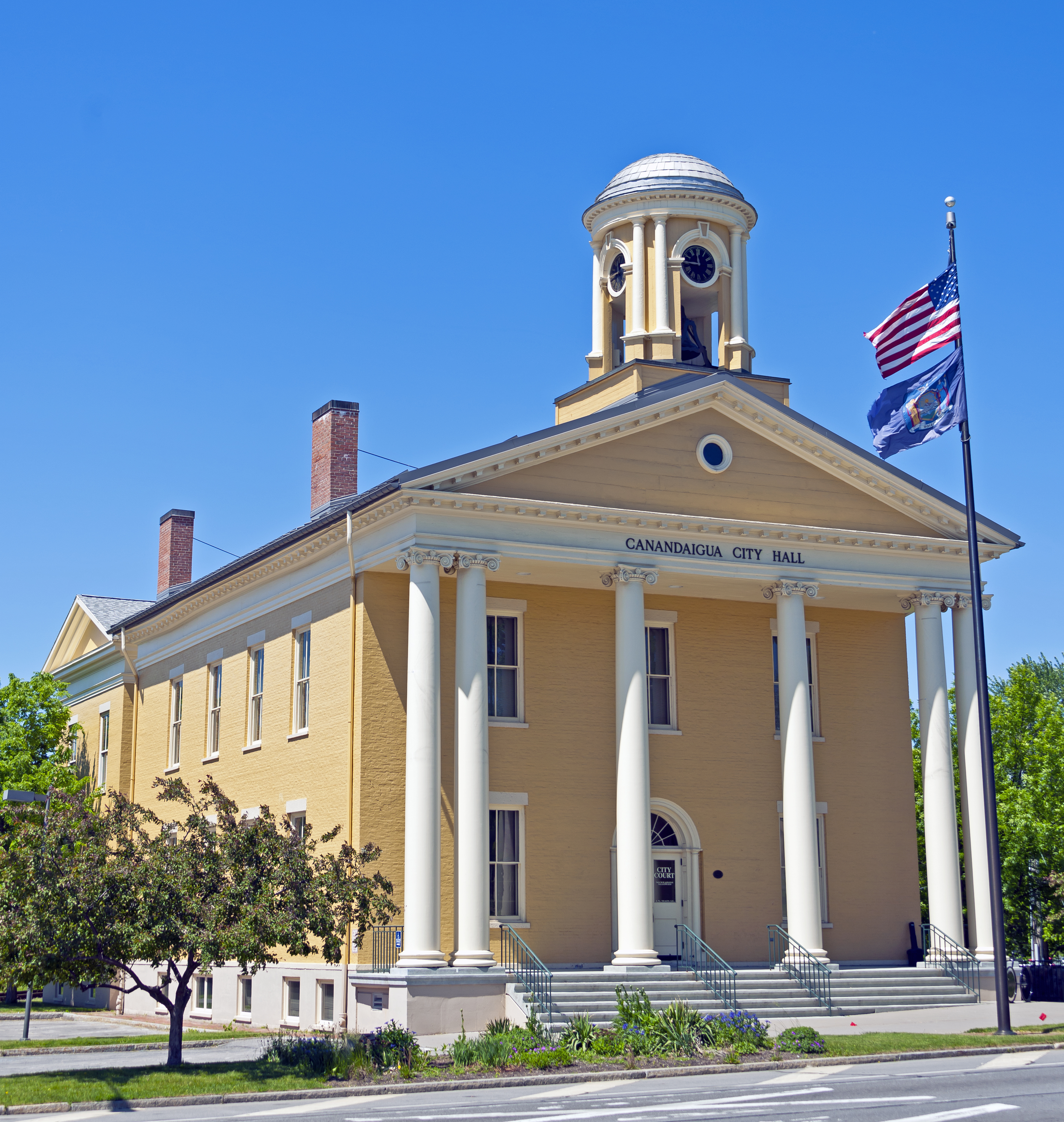
City Hall

=== 2020 census ===
As of the 2020 census, Canandaigua had a population of 10,576. The median age was 45.2 years. 17.6% of residents were under the age of 18 and 24.1% of residents were 65 years of age or older. For every 100 females there were 90.3 males, and for every 100 females age 18 and over there were 88.0 males age 18 and over.

99.9% of residents lived in urban areas, while 0.1% lived in rural areas.

There were 4,964 households in Canandaigua, of which 21.9% had children under the age of 18 living in them. Of all households, 33.0% were married-couple households, 22.8% were households with a male householder and no spouse or partner present, and 34.8% were households with a female householder and no spouse or partner present. About 41.3% of all households were made up of individuals and 19.4% had someone living alone who was 65 years of age or older.

There were 5,559 housing units, of which 10.7% were vacant. The homeowner vacancy rate was 1.7% and the rental vacancy rate was 10.0%.

Racial composition as of the 2020 census
Race	Number	Percent
White	9,409	89.0%
Black or African American	244	2.3%
American Indian and Alaska Native	32	0.3%
Asian	104	1.0%
Native Hawaiian and Other Pacific Islander	7	0.1%
Some other race	135	1.3%
Two or more races	645	6.1%
Hispanic or Latino (of any race)	354	3.3%

=== 2010 census ===
As of the census of 2010, there were 10,545 people, 4,789 households, and 2,470 families residing in the city.

=== 2000 census ===
As of the census of 2000, there were 11,264 people, 4,762 households, and 2,666 families residing in the city. The population density was 2,447.5 inhabitants per square mile (945.0/km^{2}). There were 5,066 housing units at an average density of 1,100.8 per square mile (425.0/km^{2}). The city's racial makeup was 96.04% White, 1.53% Black or African American, 0.22% Native American, 0.66% Asian, 0.06% Pacific Islander, 0.26% from other races, and 1.23% from two or more races. Hispanic or Latino of any race were 1.02% of the population.

There were 4,762 households, out of which 27.1% had children under the age of 18 living with them, 40.7% were married couples living together, 12.2% had a female householder with no husband present, and 44.0% were non-families. 35.4% of all households were made up of individuals, and 16.0% had someone living alone who was 65 years of age or older. The average household size was 2.25 and the average family size was 2.95.

In the city, the age distribution of the population shows 23.3% under the age of 18, 8.1% from 18 to 24, 27.7% from 25 to 44, 22.0% from 45 to 64, and 18.9% who were 65 years of age or older. The median age was 39 years. For every 100 females, there were 91.8 males. For every 100 females age 18 and over, there were 87.5 males.

The median income for a household in the city was $37,197, and the median income for a family was $47,388. Males had a median income of $31,950 versus $26,538 for females. The per capita income for the city was $20,153. About 5.9% of families and 9.5% of the population were below the poverty line, including 8.9% of those under age 18 and 8.9% of those age 65 or over.

== Arts and culture ==
Landmarks include:

- Sonnenberg Mansion and Gardens, a Victorian mansion and 50 acres (200,000 m^{2}) of gardens, is now a state historic park; it is open from May through mid-October and requires an admission fee.
- The New York Wine & Culinary Center, hosting a variety of exhibits, programs and classes related to New York State wine and agriculture products, opened in 2006 in downtown Canandaigua.
- Kershaw Beach at the north end of Canandaigua Lake (on Lakeshore Drive) is open to the public for a small fee.
- Canandaigua Lake State Marine Park is located in the city and offers several hard-surface boat ramps for access to Canandaigua Lake.
- At 116 Gorham Street is located one of the relatively few remaining Octagon Houses in New York, which were popular for a time in the state.
- The town of Hopewell, New York hosts an annual steam fair, called the Pageant of Steam, in August.
- Finger Lakes Community College (partially located in the town of Hopewell, New York) has the Constellation Brands – Marvin Sands Performing Arts Center, which features a variety of performances available to the community.
- Canandaigua Farmer's Market is located in the Beeman and Lafayette St. Parking Lot and runs from June–October.
- The Canandaigua Lady is a double-decker paddle wheel steamboat replica that offers public cruises on Canandaigua Lake from May–October.
- Canandaigua hosts several festivals and large events throughout the year, such as the Finger Lakes Riesling Festival, Waterfront Art Festival, Canandaigua Art and Music Festival, LakeMusic Festival, Festival of Trees at the Granger Homestead and Carriage Museum, Christkindl Market, and the Finger Lakes Plein Air Festival.
- Bristol Mountain is a winter resort in the Finger Lakes area. There are views from the summit and the 38 slopes and trails with provide a variety of inclines. It is 13.2 miles southwest of Canandaigua.

=== National Register of Historic Places ===
Within the City of Canandaigua, the following buildings, properties and districts are listed on the National Register of Historic Places:

- Adelaide Avenue School
- Benham House
- Brigham Hall
- Building at 426 South Main Street
- Canandaigua Historic District
- Canandaigua Veterans Hospital Historic District
- Thaddeus Chapin House
- Cobblestone Manor
- Granger Cottage
- Francis Granger House
- Marshall House
- North Main Street Historic District
- Saltonstall Street School
- Sonnenberg Gardens
- US Post Office - Canandaigua
- Woodlawn Cemetery

== Education ==
The Canandaigua City School District serves Canandaigua and the surrounding region. The district includes Canandaigua Academy as its high school. The main campus of Finger Lakes Community College is located just east of the city.

== Notable people ==
- George H. Boughton, former New York State Senator
- Phil Bredesen, 48th Governor of Tennessee
- Beriah Brown, former mayor of Seattle
- Caroline Chesebro' (1825–1873), writer
- Timothy Childs, former US Congressman
- Myron H. Clark, former Governor of New York (1855–1857)
- Stephen A. Douglas, former US Congressman and senator from Illinois known for his political rivalry with Abraham Lincoln.
- Arthur Dove, modernist artist
- Max Eastman, political activist, philosopher
- Francis Granger, former US Congressman, US Postmaster General under presidents William Henry Harrison and John Tyler in 1841; son of Gideon Granger
- Gideon Granger, US Postmaster General under President Thomas Jefferson from 1801 to 1814; father of Francis Granger
- Scott Greene, born in Canandaigua and played high school football at Canandaigua Academy, two-time team MVP at Michigan State University, former National Football League running back
- John Greig, former US Congressman
- Mary P. Hamlin (1871–1964), playwright
- Jason Hawes, founder of The Atlantic Paranormal Society (TAPS), Paranormal investigator, star of Syfy series Ghost Hunters
- Stanton Davis Kirkham, author and naturalist
- James H. Knowlton, former member of the Wisconsin State Assembly
- William H. Lamport, former US Congressman
- Elbridge G. Lapham, former US Senator
- Ryan Lochte, Olympic swimmer
- Dudley Marvin, former US Congressman
- Henry McDonald, professional football player
- Brian Meehl, puppeteer and author
- Michael O'Hanlon, foreign-policy expert and commentator
- Michael Park, actor and Broadway star, born in Canandaigua, played Jack Snyder on As the World Turns
- Ryan Poles, general manager of the Chicago Bears
- Augustus Seymour Porter, Mayor of Detroit and U.S. Senator of Michigan
- Emily James Smith Putnam (April 15, 1865–1944), author and educator
- John Raines, former New York State Senator
- Neil Rogers, Miami-based radio personality.
- Howard J. Samuels, New York gubernatorial candidate, Undersecretary of Commerce, head of the U.S. Small Business Administration, first chairman of the New York City Off-Track Betting Corporation, commissioner of the North American Soccer League
- Sy Sanborn, sportswriter
- Caroline Severance (1820–1914), abolitionist, suffragist, and founder of women’s clubs
- Mark H. Sibley, former US Congressman
- Philip Spencer, US Naval Officer, hanged without court-martial for planning to mutiny and become a pirate
- Troy Stark, former University of Georgia football player and NFL player, played at Canandaigua Academy
- Thomas Benton Stoddard, first mayor of La Crosse, Wisconsin, former member of the Wisconsin State Assembly
- Mary Clark Thompson (1835–July 28, 1923), born Mary Lee Clark, noted philanthropist and wife of banker Frederick Ferris Thompson
- Richard C. Wesley, federal judge on the United States Court of Appeals for the Second Circuit
- Kristen Wiig, born in Canandaigua, actress, comedian and former cast member of Saturday Night Live
- Eloise Wilkin, award-winning American illustrator, best known as an illustrator of Little Golden Books
- Roy Wilkinson, former Major League Baseball player
- John Willys, automotive pioneer
