= Syracuse and Utica Direct Railroad =

Overview
- Locale: Syracuse, New York to Utica, New York
- Dates of operation: 1853–1853
- Successor: New York Central Railroad

Technical
- Track gauge: 4 ft 8 1/2 in (1,435 mm) standard gauge

The Syracuse and Utica Direct Railroad, chartered in 1853, a rival company to the Syracuse and Utica Railroad, threatened to build a line from Syracuse, New York to Utica by a more direct route, by way of Vernon. This reduced the total travel time from four hours to three and one-half hours. The road consolidated with the New York Central Railroad in 1853.

== History ==
The Syracuse and Utica Railroad was chartered in 1836 and opened in 1839, extending the line further to Syracuse via Rome (and further to Auburn via the already-opened Auburn and Syracuse Railroad). This line was not direct, going out of its way to stay near the Erie Canal and serve Rome, and so the Syracuse and Utica Direct Railroad was chartered January 26, 1853, although nothing of this line was ever built because the West Shore Railroad served the same purpose.

=== Company management ===
In 1853, directors of the company were John Wilkinson, Oliver Teall, Holmes Hutchinson, Joseph Battell, Joel Rathbone, Hamilton White, E. W. Leavenworth, D. Wager, Samuel French, George Barnes and Horace White.

Charles Stebbens was president of the company.

=== New York Central railroad ===
The road consolidated with the New York Central Railroad in 1853.
