= Auburn and Rochester Railroad =

American railroad company

Overview
- Locale: New York, United States
- Dates of operation: 13 May 1836–1 August 1850
- Successor: Rochester and Syracuse Railroad

The Auburn and Rochester Railroad was a railroad company based in New York state in the 19th century.

== Introduction ==
The Auburn and Rochester Railroad Company was built to bring Canandaigua access to regional and national markets and sources. Extending southeast from Rochester to Geneva and Canandaigua with a trackage length of 78½ miles, its right-of-way exceeded that of the contemporaneous and nearby Auburn and Syracuse Railroad Company.

The road was chartered on 13 May 1836.

The Panic of 1837 slowed construction, and the Genesee River had to be bridged. The line reached Geneva in September 1840, Canandaigua in November 1841. Initially, some ninety percent of the line's business was the haulage of passengers, and local merchants had to persuade the company, in 1841, to schedule one freight run a week.

== History, 1836 to 1850 ==
If this railroad company started life unusually, it was in having its state charter specifically lay out its route. Normally, the charter granted by the legislature stipulates the termini, leaving the precise routing to the company, its directors, management, and engineers. When the New York Legislature established the Auburn and Rochester Railroad Company under Chapter 349 of the corporate law, "...the act provided that it should be constructed between the village of Auburn and the city of Rochester, 'commencing in the village of Auburn at the termination of the Auburn and Syracuse Railroad and running thence through the village of Seneca Falls and the town of Waterloo; the village of Geneva and the village of Vienna and the town of Manchester; the village of Canandaigua and thence through the town of Victor by the most eligible route to the city of Rochester where it may terminate at and connect with the Tonawanda Railroad.'"

Henry Bicker Gibson, a wealthy Canandaigua banker, provided the impetus and the direction, serving as a founder, an investor, and the president of the corporation. When the thirteen directors were elected in March, 1837, there were five hundred and forty-one subscribers to the company's stock. They represented not only Canandaigua, the center of interest in this railroad, but the intervening communities as well, reflecting the deep commercial interest that they had in a railroad connection to the rest of the country. Pivotal in making this undertaking happen was the state legislature's guarantee of the bonds with which it was financed.

At the time, canals occupied a position of privilege in New York, with legal protection of their access to markets, sometimes bordering upon monopoly. The company's charter addressed the canal problem by granting the right to haul property as well as passengers, with this proviso "but the corporation hereby created shall not take and transport merchandise in such a manner as to lessen the income on the Erie Canal during the time when the canal is navigable." The charter did not specify either a penalty for contravention of this clause nor any means of its enforcement against the company. As far as is known, this was never tested in court; the matter became moot when the canal laws changed in 1844.

Gibson, an official of the Ontario Bank, was elected president, and Charles Seymour, the secretary and treasurer. They held these positions during the remaining corporate life of the company. When the Auburn and Rochester Railroad Company was consolidated on 1 August 1850 into the Rochester and Syracuse, they served in the same positions in that company and held them until that line was in turn merged into the New York Central.

The company appointed Robert Higham as engineer. He had been a resident engineer on the Utica and Schenectady; he left when the road was opened in August 1836, with a glowing commendation by his former employer. He built the Auburn and Rochester, serving for some years as its superintendent and went from this road to the Hudson River Railroad.

Higham set out to develop the route. The route surveys took the spring and summer of 1837. From his report to the board, one can derive a sense of the state of railroad technology at the time:

To the President and Directors of the Auburn and Rochester Railroad Company:

Gentlemen:

We shall be able to pass the whole distance, between Auburn and Rochester, without having any grade to exceed twenty-eight feet ascent or descent, per mile, and that without any very deep cuttings on the summits, or high embankments in the valleys. The curves generally will be of a large radius only one being as low as 1000 feet.

The work throughout, will be of a plain and easy character, without any heavy rock excavation, or expensive river walling, and with as little perishable structure as perhaps any Road of the same extent in the United States. The superstructure of bridges over the Erie and Seneca canals, the Seneca and Genesee rivers, and some others of minor importance, (the cost of the whole amounting to $19,190) in fact, constituting the only perishable part of the road; and allowing that this will require an expenditure equal to ten per cent per annum, on its cost, to renew and keep it in repair, will amount to $1,919 -- a mere nominal sum for repairs, on so great a work. This permanency in the character of the work, will unquestionably be a consideration of great importance, with those who wish to have their money invested in stocks that will yield them an annual return of profits instead of having it consumed in continual repairs.

The grading for that portion of the route which lies between the village of Auburn and Seneca Falls, is through gravel and clay soils; for the remainder of the distance it is generally through loam, sand and gravel, and at three several points some slight lime-rock cuttings, but not more than will furnish the necessary quantity of stone to be used for culverts and bridge abutments, in their vicinity.

The character of the masonry, I have estimated to be of plain, rough, hammer dressed stone work, laid in quick lime mortar.

The following estimates are made for grading and masonry for a double track -- the first track to be laid immediately, the second track as soon after as requisite. Considering this as one of the links in the great chain of Western Railroads, from Boston to Buffalo and the "far West," the estimates are made on a scale of corresponding character and magnitude to accommodate the business of this great and increasing thoroughfare; and nothing short of a double track will, in my opinion, be adequate for any great period. This is indicated by the fact, that the travel on the Utica and Schenectady Railroad, (which forms another link in this same chain) already requires the second track, to do the business of carrying passengers only; and the fact, that the Tonawanda Railroad, (from Rochester to Batavia) with its present accommodations, having only a single track, is inadequate to the business, although trains of cars run day and night.

The subject of wooden superstructure, from its importance, has occupied much attention. From the experience of the present day, there can be no question, that a combination of timber and iron makes, under all circumstances, the preferable road for this climate. The greatest objection to roads of this character, is the large amount of perishable materials used in their construction, as all the different kinds of timber that can be procured in sufficient size and quantities for rails, are not of a durable nature; and from their exposed situation near the surface of the ground they must decay very rapidly. It is found, that in ordinary cases, the common timber of the country will require replacing, on an average, every six or seven years.

The following plan for a durable structure, is suggested for your consideration, as a better and cheaper road, than the common modes: The sills to be 4 by 12 inches, well bedded; the top surface four inches below the grade of the road; on the sills are spiked cross-ties of red cedar, three inches thick, of any width not less than 4 inches, and two feet from centre to centre. Between the cross-ties are red cedar blocks, 3 by 6 inches, and one foot long, leaving spaces between the ties and blocks, not exceeding 8 inches. Upon the blocks and ties, and under the rail plates, is a locust ribbon, one inch thick and three inches wide, to raise the iron rail, and clear the flanges of the wheels from the ties. Upon the locust ribbon is placed the rail plate, one inch thick, 2 1/4 inches wide on the bottom, and two inches wide on the top. The spikes to pass through the iron plate, the locust ribbon and the ties, into the sills, confining the whole together.

The locust and cedar being durable beyond any experience, may be considered, practically, as permanent as the iron. The sills may be of any timber of the country; being bedded in the earth, and remaining moist and free from the action of the atmosphere they will last for a great length of time. The bearing between the ties and blocks being so small, the plate and ribbon will be abundantly strong for any weight that can at any time be brought upon them. Their spikes being one foot from centre to centre, and passing into the ties and sills, would have an equal or greater hold to keep the rail in its place, than in the common wooden rails. It is believed that the increased size of the rail plate will be materially important in giving stability to the road, and will be more than sufficient to compensate for the large wooden rails, in keeping the road firm and in place.

The fare rates set by the charter provide some insight into prices of the day. The passenger fare per mile for one person and ordinary baggage was restricted to three cents. The company lobbied the legislature of 1837 to secure an increase to a maximum of four cents. Among the incentives for this move was the difficulty of attracting sufficient capital with the three cent limitation, other railroads having been granted better terms.

By 1848, the company had spent more than $2,655,000 on construction. The engineering estimate had been less than $1,450,000. However, the revenue realized by the railroad considerably exceeded the engineer's estimates.

Although the line had been planned to have double tracks, only one was ever built. As done on other early roads, strap rail construction was utilized. While this secured significant capital economies, it inevitably incurred greater operational risks, including the notorious "snakehead", in which the metal strap upon which the rolling stock rode would come loose from its wood support and be projected up through the car floor by the first wheel to snag the strap's end. There was, prior to 1848, no legal obligation to report accidents; company records show only a single snakehead incident, occurring in June 1848.

The line was opened in sections: from Rochester to Canandaigua on 19 September 1840; to Seneca Falls on 9 June 1841; to Cayuga on 18 September 1841; and to the terminus in Auburn on 4 November 1841. The average train speed was 14 miles an hour; this was attributed to the use of strap rails.

The wages paid were fixed by the Board of Directors. Typical values, in 1842, were:

Engineer and superintendent         $3,000.00 (per annum)
Receiver of tickets (at Rochester)      50.00 (per month)
Receiver of tickets (at Auburn)         25.00 (per month)
Conductor                               50.00 (per month)
general clerk                           50.00 (per month)
Freight agent                           40.00 (per month)
Baggage handler                         25.00 (per month)
Locomotive engineer                      2.00 (per day)

One decision by the railroads in Rochester left passengers cold. The Tonawanda's ticket office was located in the United States Hotel on Main Street West, at the Erie Canal. The Auburn and Rochester built its terminal several blocks away. Because of pressure from local hotels, the only connection between the two railroads was a hack (Note: Taxi cab.) trip, not an entirely pleasant experience for weary travelers, particularly in winter. Not until the state legislature intervened was this resolved; the Tonawanda blinked first and extended its line to the Auburn terminal, abandoning its old station on Buffalo Street. (Note: Today's West Main Street.) The Auburn and Rochester station was on Mill Street, near State Street. The track into the station ran on what is today Central Avenue, having crossed East Avenue where today the Can of Worms stands.

The trip from Auburn to Rochester was seventy-six miles. If the train was on time, that took three hours and forty minutes.

== Demise ==
On 1 August 1850, the Auburn and Rochester Railroad merged with the Auburn and Syracuse Railroad to form the Rochester and Syracuse Railroad. In turn, this merged with the Direct Railway between Syracuse and Rochester (Note: The name of this line adverts to the peculiar fact that there had not theretofore been a direct rail connection between Rochester and Syracuse.) five days later and was consolidated into the New York Central Railroad in 1853. The route is operated today by Finger Lakes Railway from Auburn to Victor with the section from Victor to Rochester abandoned with parts converted to a trail. In 1992, a Cobblestone Railroad Pumphouse constructed about 1845 and located at the hamlet of Fishers in Ontario County, New York was listed on the National Register of Historic Places.
