= Cobblestone Railroad Pumphouse =

- U.S. National Register of Historic Places
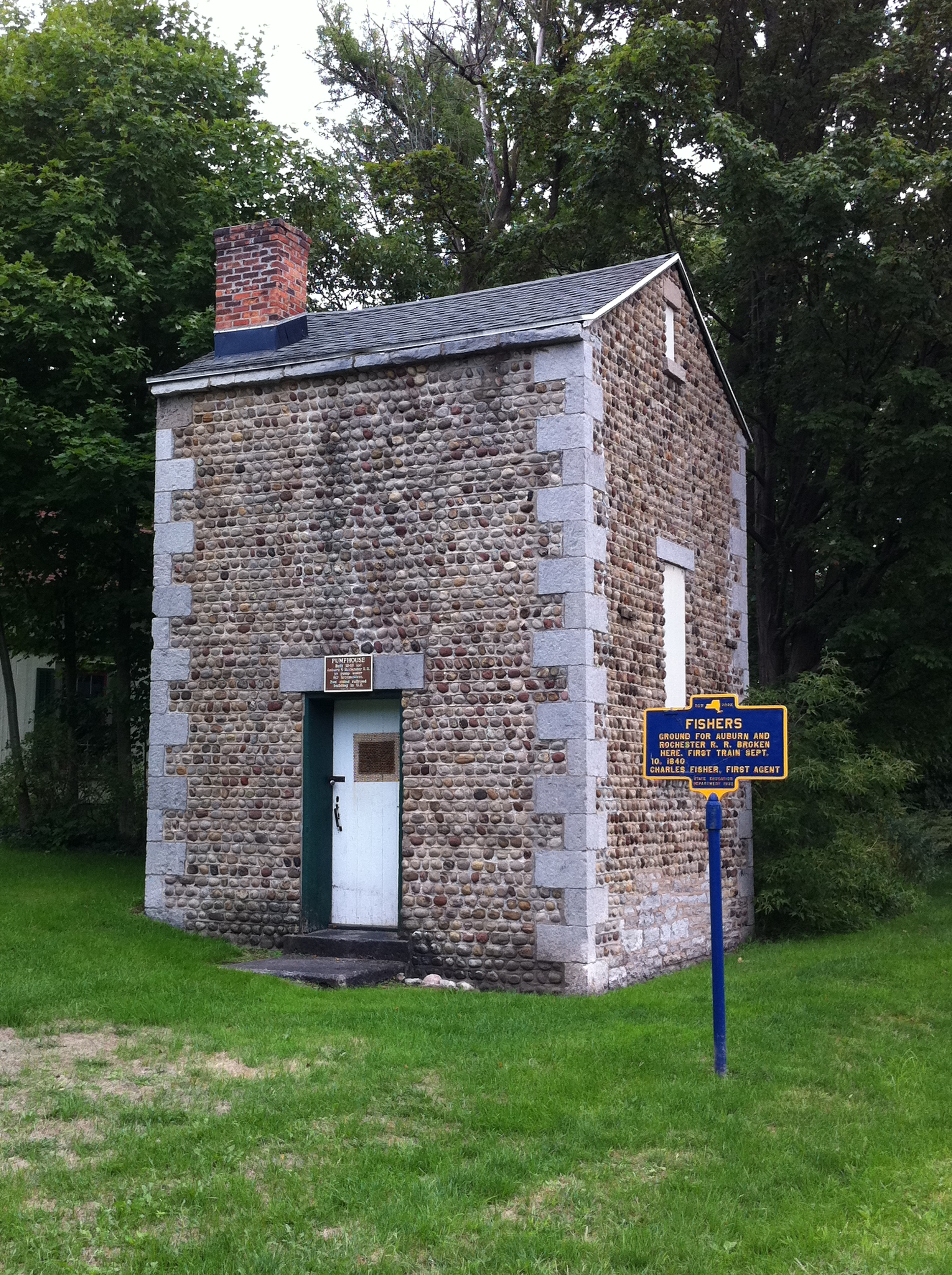

- Location within New York Location within the United States
- Location: Main Street Fishers, Victor, New York
- Coordinates: 43°0′31″N 77°28′2″W
- Area: less than one acre
- Built: 1845
- Architectural style: Mid 19th Century Revival
- MPS: Cobblestone Architecture of New York State MPS
- NRHP reference No.: 92000551
- Added to NRHP: May 22, 1992

Cobblestone Railroad Pumphouse is a historic pumphouse located at the hamlet of Fishers in the town of Victor in Ontario County, New York. It was constructed about 1845 by the Auburn and Rochester Railroad and is a small cobblestone structure. It is built of relatively large, rough variously colored field cobbles. It is one of approximately 101 cobblestone buildings in Ontario County.

It was listed on the National Register of Historic Places in 1992.
