= Rochester and Syracuse Railroad =

Overview
- Locale: Rochester, New York to Syracuse, New York
- Dates of operation: 1850–1853
- Predecessors: Auburn and Rochester Railroad; Auburn and Syracuse Railroad
- Successor: New York Central Railroad

Technical
- Track gauge: 1,435 mm (4 ft 8 1/2 in)
- Length: 176 miles (283 km)

The Rochester and Syracuse Railroad was a railway company in the United States. It was incorporated in 1850 to consolidate the Auburn and Rochester Railroad and Auburn and Syracuse Railroad, giving it a railway line between Rochester and Syracuse via Auburn, New York. The company constructed a new, more direct line between its two namesake cities, which opened in 1853. The railroad was consolidated with nine other railroads in 1853 to form the first New York Central Railroad.

== History ==
The oldest predecessor of the Rochester and Syracuse Railroad was the Auburn and Syracuse Railroad, which was incorporated in 1834. The company completed a 23-mile (37 km) between Syracuse and Auburn, New York, in 1838. The Auburn and Rochester Railroad was incorporated in 1836, and completed a 73-mile (117 km) line between Auburn and Rochester, New York, in 1841. Together, the two lines provided a route between Rochester and Syracuse, and served a number of cities bypassed by the Erie Canal, which ran further north. The Syracuse and Utica Railroad, completed in 1839, provided a connection to the east.

The Rochester and Syracuse Railroad was incorporated on August 1, 1850, to consolidate the two older companies and develop a more direct route between its two namesake cities. On August 6, it acquired the Direct Railway between Syracuse and Rochester, incorporated in 1848, which owned some right-of-way but had performed no construction work. The new line, shorter than the original route and double-tracked, was completed on June 1, 1853, after the company's consolidation.

The Rochester and Syracuse Railroad was consolidated with nine other railroads to form the first New York Central Railroad on May 1, 1853.
