= Felt Cobblestone General Store =

Historic commercial building in New York, United States

- U.S. National Register of Historic Places
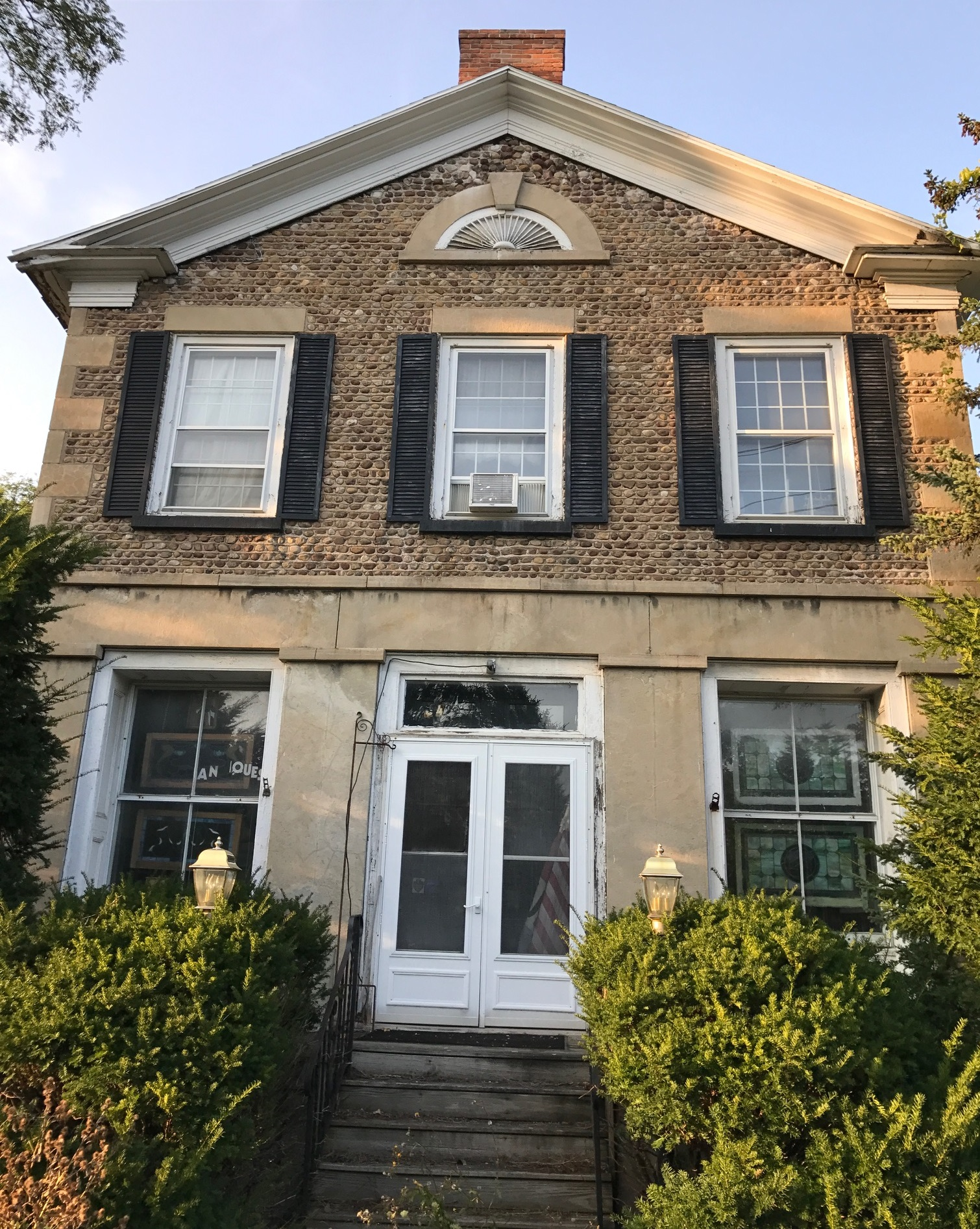

- Location within New York Location within the United States
- Location: 6452 Victor--Manchester Rd., Victor, New York
- Coordinates: 42°58′28″N 77°22′53″W
- Area: less than one acre
- Built: 1835
- Architectural style: Greek Revival
- MPS: Cobblestone Architecture of New York State MPS
- NRHP reference No.: 92000553
- Added to NRHP: May 22, 1992

Felt Cobblestone General Store is a historic general store located at the hamlet of East Victor in Victor in Ontario County, New York. It was constructed about 1835 and is a two-story, three bay cobblestone structure in the late Federal / early Greek Revival style. It is built of irregularly shaped, multi-colored field cobbles. It is one of approximately 101 cobblestone buildings in Ontario County and one of approximately 20 commercial cobblestone structures in New York State. The store was known to be one of only 5 stores in New York State licensed to sell coca wine.

It was listed on the National Register of Historic Places in 1992.
