= Samuel R. Callaway =

American railroad executive

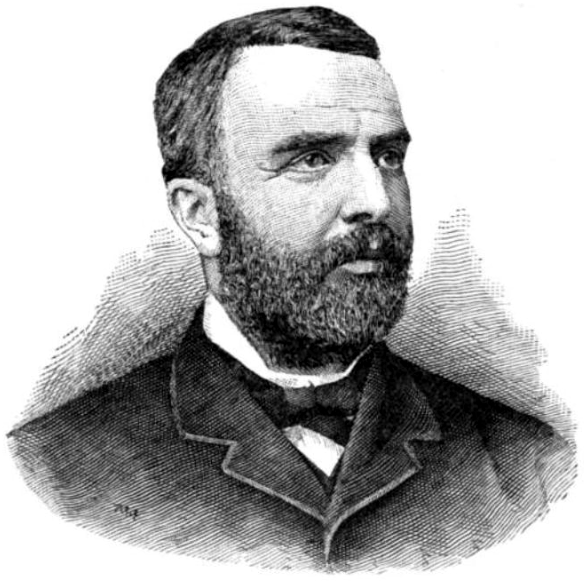
- Born: December 24, 1850; Toronto, Ontario, Canada
- Died: June 1, 1904 (aged 53); New York City, New York, United States
- Occupation: Railroad executive

Samuel Rodger Callaway (December 24, 1850 – June 1, 1904) was an American railroad executive. He served as president of Chicago and Western Indiana Railroad and Belt Line, second vice president and general manager of Union Pacific Railroad 1884–1887, president of Toledo, St. Louis and Kansas City Railroad 1887–1895, president of Nickel Plate Road 1895–1897, president of Lake Shore and Michigan Southern Railroad 1897–1898, president of New York Central Railroad 1898-1901 and as president of American Locomotive Company 1901–1904.

== Early life and family ==
Samuel R. Callaway was born in Ontario, Canada; sources differ on his birth date, some citing 1850, others 1851. He listed his birth date in the 1900 U.S. census as December 1850. Samuel's parents, Frederick and Margaret Callaway, were of English and Scottish birth.

On June 7, 1875, in Hamilton, Ontario, Samuel Callaway married Elizabeth J. "Jennie" Ecclestone, daughter of W.T. and Anna Ecclestone. Together they had a daughter and two sons: Annie, Samuel Thompson. and Trowbridge.

== Career ==
Callaway began his railroad career in 1863 with the Grand Trunk Railway, where he served as an apprentice to the treasurer, earning $8.33 per month. He was promoted through several positions and in 1874 was appointed as superintendent of Detroit and Milwaukee Railroad; Callaway continued in this position until 1878 when he became superintendent of Detroit, Saginaw and Bay City Railroad.

From 1887 to 1895, Callaway served as president and receiver of Toledo, St. Louis and Kansas City Railroad; under his leadership the railroad was reorganized and rebuilt. It was his work at this railroad that earned the attention of the Vanderbilt family and the New York Central system.

Callaway succeeded D. W. Caldwell as president of the Nickel Plate Road in 1895. It was about this time that Callaway was also offered the position of president for the Grand Trunk system he had recently left; he declined this position based on his feeling that he would not be allowed the autonomy that he wanted from the Grand Trunk's board of directors. Callaway was succeeded as president of the Nickel Plate Road by W. H. Canniff in 1897. Callaway then succeeded D. W. Caldwell as president of the Lake Shore and Michigan Southern Railroad in 1897.

On April 20, 1898, Callaway succeeded Chauncey Depew as president of New York Central Railroad. At the time of Callaway's assumption of the presidency of New York Central, other significant leadership changes were made as well. Cornelius Vanderbilt II retired from the chairmanship of the New York Central and the Michigan Central and William K. Vanderbilt retired from the chairmanship of the Lake Shore & Michigan Southern and the Nickel Plate Road, although both continued as directors for these railroads after the change.

When the American Locomotive Company (Alco) was formed through the merger of several smaller locomotive manufacturers in 1901, Callaway was selected to be the new company's first president. The merger was widely not seen as positive by the public, so the directors chose Callaway hoping his reputation as a railroad leader would help with public opinion of the company. Callaway was succeeded as president of Alco by Albert J. Pitkin.

== Death and legacy ==
Samuel R. Callaway died at his home in New York City on June 1, 1904, following an operation for mastoiditis.

The village of Callaway, Nebraska, is named in his honor.

Business positions
Preceded by	President of Chicago and Western Indiana Railroad	Succeeded by
Preceded by	President of Toledo, St. Louis and Kansas City Railroad; 1887 – 1895	Succeeded by
Preceded by D. W. Caldwell	President of Nickel Plate Road; 1895 – 1897	Succeeded by W. H. Canniff
Preceded by D. W. Caldwell	President of Lake Shore and Michigan Southern Railroad; 1897 – 1898	Succeeded by
Preceded by Chauncey Depew	President of New York Central Railroad; 1898 – 1901	Succeeded by
New office	President of American Locomotive Company; 1901 – 1904	Succeeded by Albert J. Pitkin
