= Jeremiah Cronkite House =

Historic house in New York, United States

- U.S. National Register of Historic Places
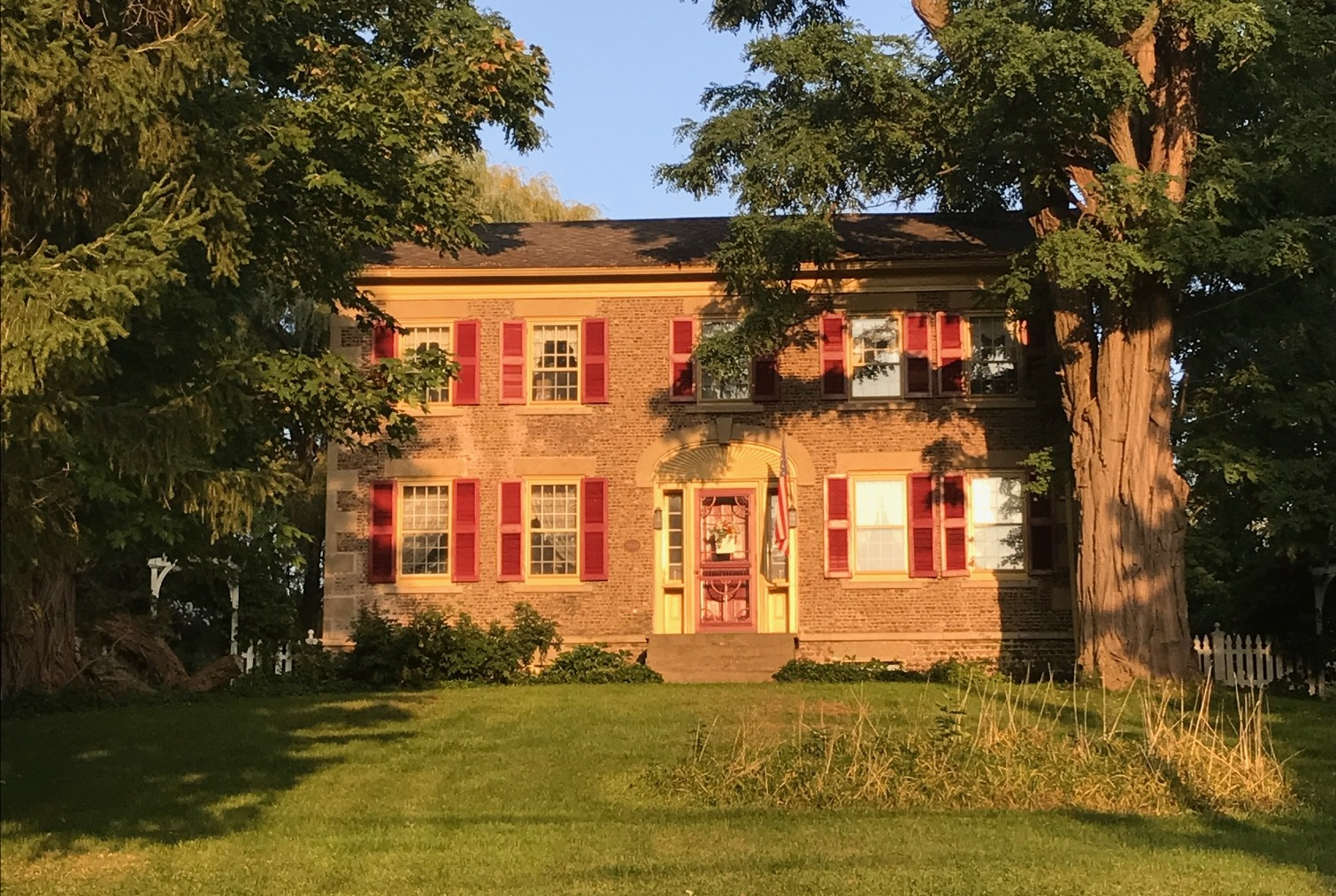

- Location within New York Location within the United States
- Location: 1095 Lynaugh Rd., Victor, New York
- Coordinates: 42°58′59″N 77°23′51″W
- Area: 4.8 acres (1.9 ha)
- Built: c. 1847
- Architectural style: Federal
- NRHP reference No.: 01001563
- Added to NRHP: February 5, 2002

The Jeremiah Cronkite House is a historic house located at 1095 Lynaugh Road in Victor, Ontario County, New York, United States.

== Description and history ==
The house is an imposing Federal style cobblestone building constructed in about 1847. The two-story, 36 feet wide by 18 feet deep rectangular dwelling is constructed of smooth, glacial deposited gray and light brown cobblestones. Also on the property is a mid-to-late-19th century contributing barn.

It was listed on the National Register of Historic Places on February 5, 2002.
