= Valentown Hall =

Historic commercial building in New York, United States

- U.S. National Register of Historic Places
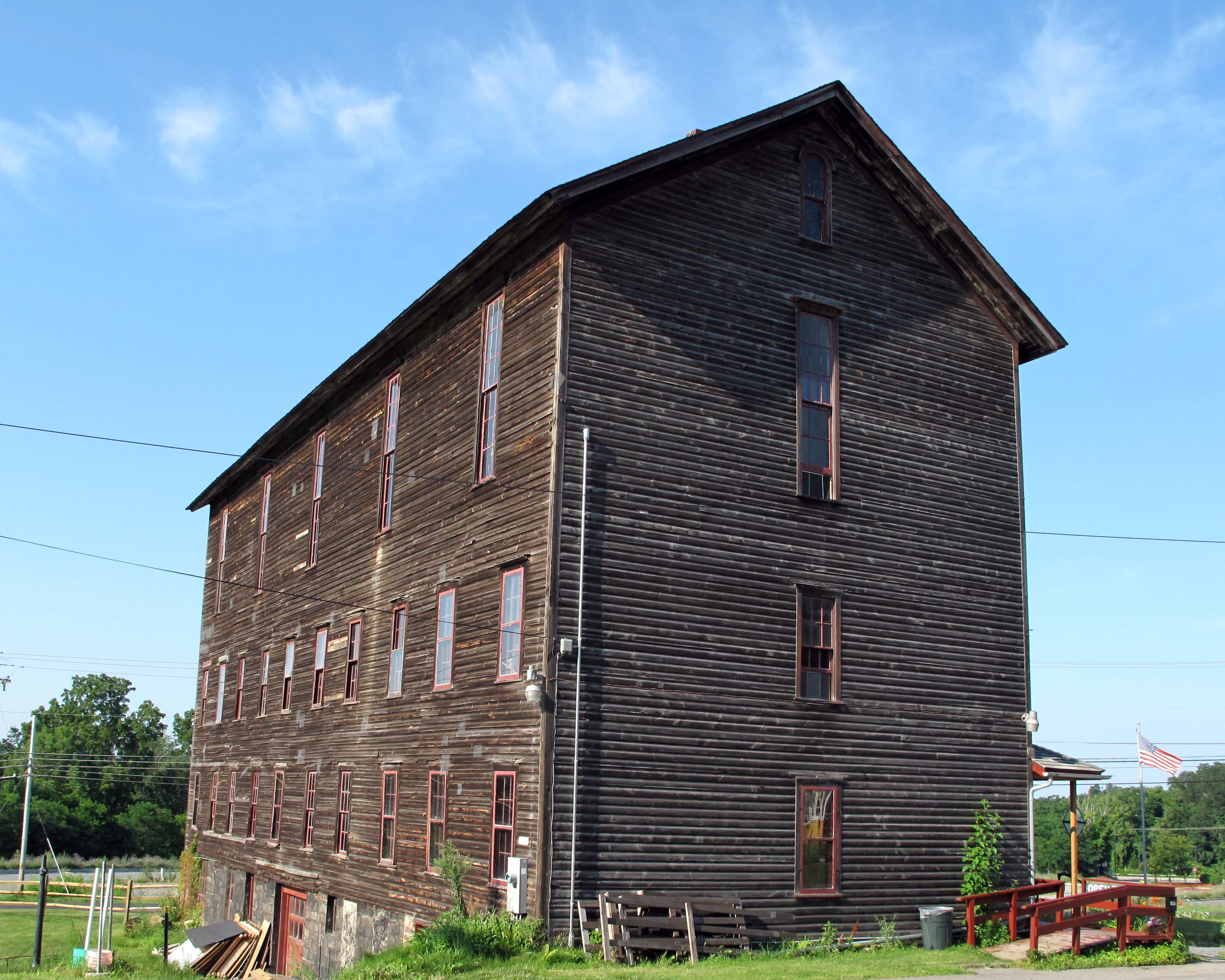

- Location within New York Location within the United States
- Location: Jct. of High St. and Valentown Rd., Victor, New York
- Coordinates: 43°1′34″N 77°26′9″W
- Area: 13 acres (5.3 ha)
- Built: 1879
- NRHP reference No.: 97000425
- Added to NRHP: May 09, 1997

Valentown Hall is the name of an abandoned historic shopping and community center located in Victor, New York. The structure was built in 1879 by Levi Valentine, and today it is operated as a museum on the National Register of Historic Places.

== Overview ==
In 1879, Levi Valentine built the four-story structure as the central commercial and community building of a new town to be created by Valentine and named "Valentown" (a combination of his parents' names "Valentine" & "Town"). Valentine's motive was a forthcoming railroad line that was to travel past the building. However, his forward-thinking plan yielded an unfortunate result when the railroad company went bankrupt and did not complete the line. With no demand for a commercial center in the location, "Valentown" eventually failed as an enterprise and was abandoned in the early 1900s.

In 1940, local historian J. Sheldon Fisher purchased the property, restored it, and officially opened Valentown as a museum in 1950. The property is owned and operated today by the Victor Historical Society as a local history museum, with artifacts from nineteenth century life in the Fishers, Victor and Rochester, New York area.

Most of the building's interior remains in the same condition and setup as it was when it was originally built. It currently contains a general store, meeting room, bakery, harness shop, cobbler's shop, millinery shop, music school, ticket office, grange room and grand ballroom. There are multiple display cases and exhibits including artifacts from the original local insulator industry, Civil War artifacts, clothing & hats galore, farm implements and household utensils, candle making molds, spinning wheels, railroad & trolley memorabilia, blacksmith tools, paintings, old maps, and much more. It also contains a wagon from the 1700s which was used in the American Revolutionary War.

In 1997 the Hall was included in the National Register of Historical Places. Fisher remained the owner of Valentown until 1998, when the Victor Historical Society, a non-profit organization, bought the museum, its collection, and approximately 13 acres. The organization also bought the Ichabod Town Homestead built in 1835, the early 1800s schoolhouse, and additional buildings.

== Historical significance ==
=== Valentine homestead ===
Valentown Museum (originally called Valentown Hall) is just one in a cluster of historic 19th century buildings at 13-acre Valentown Square, off Rt. 96 across from Eastview Mall in Victor, New York.

In 1879, Levi and Alanson Valentine constructed the 4-story shopping plaza and community center (complete with underground parking) on a busy crossroads homestead owned by their grandfather, Ichabod Town, hoping the property would be a stop on the Pittsburgh, Shawmut, and Northern Railroad. The Valentine homestead and farm remained in the family for much of the 19th century, but by 1892, the former Ichabod Town homestead was occupied by George Pickering and his wife, Jane Baker Pickering. The latter was the first female doctor in Victor and she established her medical office in the historic home.

The abode continued to house notable Victor residents in the 20th century. In 1940s, longtime area residents Lillian and J. Sheldon Fisher purchased Valentown Hall to repurpose it as a museum of local history. The couple and their four children lived in cramped quarters on the building’s second floor until 1965, when they acquired the Ichabod Town house, which remained their residence for several years.

The landmark 4 story building is a rare example of 19th century architecture that has remained almost unaltered since its original construction in 1879. The inside contains the original Grange meeting room, a Grange run co-op general store and bakery, community meeting room, harness shop, millinery shop, cobbler's shop, music school, and 3rd floor Grand Ballroom. During the 1880's through the early 1900's the hall served as housing for the meetings, events and community gatherings organized by the local residents and the Victor Grange (#322) Patrons of Husbandry.

=== The Grange ===
The great farm fraternity known as the Grange had its beginnings through the efforts of the Federal Government in an attempt to bring order and healing to the grievous wounds of warfare and chaos in the South immediately following the Civil War. In 1866, Oliver Hudson Kelley, an employee of the Agricultural Department, was sent by Commissioner of Agriculture Isaac Newton on a mission into the Southern States that the Civil War had ravaged to report on the conditions of their agriculture and needs.

The first subordinate Grange organized by Kelley was Fredonia Grange #1 in Chautauqua County, NY, on April 16, 1868. The 1st year State Granges were organized numbered 10, the 2nd year 36 were added, the 3rd year 134 were added and at the end of the 4th year the total number of Granges had reached 1,005. By 1874 new Granges were averaging about 2,000 a month. At the end of the 8th year, Kelley announced that 24,290 charters had been granted to Granges.

The Victor Grange (#322) was founded in 1875 when they held their first meeting that same year. Among the 38 Victor Grange member applicants that petitioned for and were awarded a Grange Charter were Valentown's own Levi Valentine and the Pickering family. In 1880, after the construction of Valentown Hall was complete, the Hall was hired by the Grange to house the Grange meetings plus a place for stabling horses, and furniture was also bought for the Hall.

The Mertensia Grange and Victor Grange merged in 1913. Until the merger, the Victor Grange meetings were held in Valentown Hall, which at that time was well kept and made a good place for such work. The Mertensia Grange meetings were held in the schoolhouse and at the home of various members. After the consolidation of the two granges, meetings were held in W. B. Gallup block until quarters became too small and it was necessary to move into the auditorium of Victor Town Hall.

=== Conversion to Valentown Museum ===
For 30 years, Valentown Hall served as the local community's commercial and social center, but was abandoned in the early 1900s. It was privately purchased by J. Sheldon Fisher in 1940, who restored it and opened it as a public museum in 1950 . It is now owned and operated by Victor Historical Society (a 501-C3 NFP Organization) and was registered on the National Register of Historic Places on May 9, 1999. It is now known as the "Historic Valentown Museum".

During the early to mid-2000s, the site attracted the interest of several paranormal groups, leading to significant conflict between these groups and the owners of the museum as the latter attempted to maintain a proper emphasis on the historical significance of the site.

Today, Valentown Hall operates solely as a historical museum, housing many exhibits with display cases and room settings that depict historic American artifacts and heirlooms that represent the rural life of nineteenth and early twentieth century people who once lived in the Victor area near Rochester, New York.

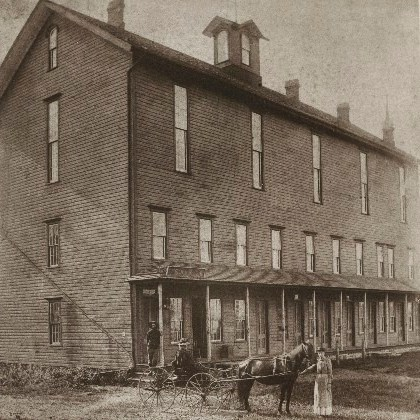

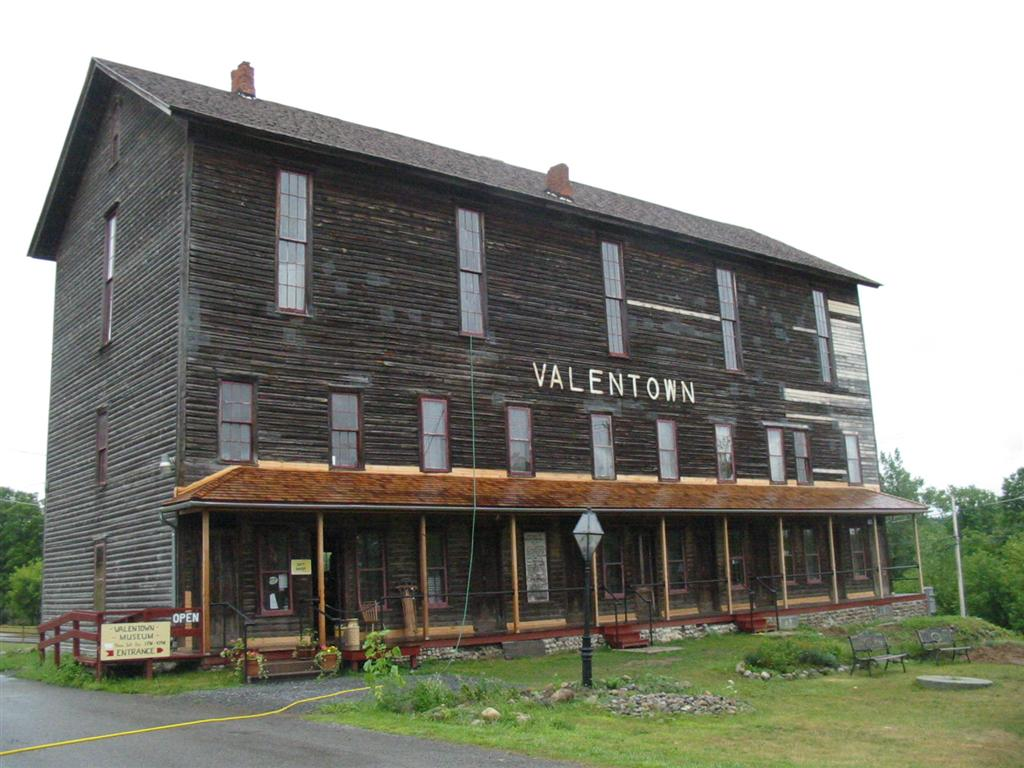

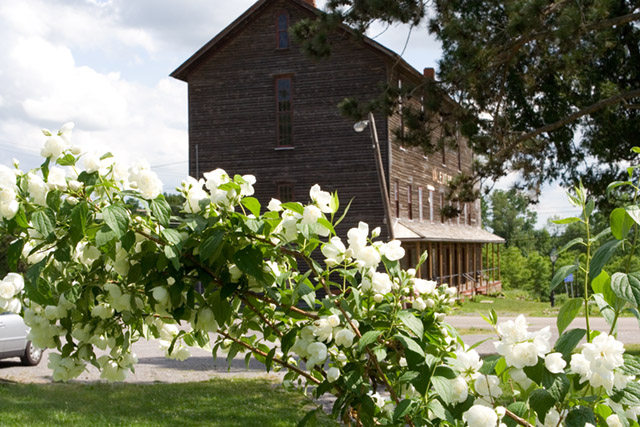
Valentown Hall
