= Utica and Schenectady Railroad =

Railroad company in New York

Overview
- Dates of operation: 1833–1853
- Successor: New York Central Railroad

Technical
- Track gauge: 1,435 mm (4 ft 8 1/2 in)
- Length: 78 miles (126 km)

The Utica and Schenectady Railroad was a railway company in the United States. It was incorporated in 1833 and opened a line between Utica and Schenectady, New York, in 1836. The railroad was consolidated with nine other railroads in 1853 to form the first New York Central Railroad.

== History ==
The Utica and Schenectady Railroad was incorporated on April 29, 1833. As its planned route ran parallel to the Erie Canal, the state barred it from carrying freight. This restriction was relaxed in 1844: the railroad was permitted to carry freight during the seasonal closings of the canal. This traffic was still subject to a toll. The line opened between Utica and Schenectady on August 1, 1836. It connected in Schenectady with the Mohawk and Hudson Railroad. The company gained a westbound connection on August 3, 1839, with the opening of the Syracuse and Utica Railroad.

Albany businessman Erastus Corning served as president of the company for the entirety of its existence. The Utica and Schenectady was consolidated with nine other railroads to form the first New York Central Railroad on May 1, 1853. Corning became president of the new company.
