= Auburn and Syracuse Railroad =

Defunct upstate New York railroad

Overview
- Locale: Auburn, New York to Syracuse, New York
- Dates of operation: 1834–1850
- Successor: Rochester and Syracuse Railroad later part of New York Central Railroad

Technical
- Track gauge: 4 ft 8 1/2 in (1,435 mm) standard gauge

The Auburn and Syracuse Railroad was incorporated on May 1, 1834, to provide easy access between Auburn, New York, and the Erie Canal. Construction was begun in 1835, but was delayed during the Panic of 1837. Although the economic downturn lingered until 1843, the railroad was completed by January 1838.

In August 1850, the Auburn and Syracuse Railroad joined the Auburn and Rochester Railroad to form the Rochester and Syracuse Railroad, which later merged with the New York Central Railroad.

== History ==
Syracuse railroad "subscribers" contributed $31,000 to the $400,000 stock authorized in the incorporation articles received on May 1, 1834. Among the 20 investors was Vivus W. Smith, who later was one of the founders of the Syracuse Journal.

=== Horse drawn ===
The work had been done "on the cheap", with low-quality railbed preparation and wooden rails. The Auburn and Syracuse Railroad was opened for business on January 8, 1838, with horse-drawn trains and did not use steam locomotives until the introduction of its first, the Syracuse, on June 14, 1839.

=== Steam locomotive ===
Only after the advent of the steam railroad did the train finally arrive in Syracuse. Originally, a millpond on the site of the State Armory, located at the present-day Armory Square on West Jefferson Street, blocked the right-of-way. Until a trestle was built across the pond, passengers were "forced to find other means" of getting into the village of Syracuse from a temporary station at Geddes.

=== Auburn road ===
Known as the Auburn Road (a nickname that later passed to the Rochester and Syracuse Railroad), the company erected a new depot between Salina and Clinton streets in late 1838. Work on the trestle was completed in early 1839, as well as construction of a new railroad station in Downtown Syracuse.

By late 1839, one of the trains achieved the 26 miles (42 km) run in 58 minutes. A year later, in 1840, the event was reported in the Western State Journal

While passenger service constituted the bulk of the company's revenue operations, an arrangement under the existing canal-protection laws allowed the Auburn and Syracuse Railroad (A&S) to carry freight as well. In this capacity, it served the Erie Canal rather than competing against it.

=== Depot ===
The depot was replaced in 1839, when the depot of the Syracuse and Utica Railroad was ready for use. The depot of the original Auburn Road was not known for either beauty or finish, presenting a "striking contrast to its majestic neighbor across the street."

=== Rochester and Syracuse railroad ===
On 1 August 1850, the Auburn and Syracuse Railroad joined the Auburn and Rochester Railroad to form the Rochester and Syracuse Railroad.

=== New York Central railroad ===
A weak link in the network of rail lines in New York State, the A&S achieved distinction only by becoming a constituent of one of the world's genuinely-significant rail companies, the New York Central Railroad. It was one of eight independent small lines in upstate New York which Erastus Corning, of Albany, saw as the basis of a statewide consolidation. In 1853, this company became part of the New York Central Railroad.

Into the 1940s, the New York Central operated at least two passenger trains per day in each direction on the route, with an additional train between Geneva and Syracuse each day except Sundays. The NYC operated one train a day on the route until 1958.

=== Stations served on the route ===
The following were the stations served on the route in its last years of service:

- Syracuse (at Syracuse passengers could make connections to other New York Central trains to Boston, New York City and New York's North Country
- Camillus (westbound only)
- Martisco (westbound only)
- Skaneateles Jct.
- Auburn
- Cayuga
- Seneca Falls
- Waterloo
- Geneva
- Oaks Corners (eastbound only)
- Phelps
- Clifton Springs
- Shortsville
- Chapin
- Canandaigua
- Victor
- Pittsford
- Rochester
