= Victor, New York =

Victor, New York Tganödagë:ën (Seneca)
- Town
- Motto: Live Work Visit Learn Invest Play
- Location within the state of New York
- Coordinates: 42°58′48″N 77°24′36″W
- Country: United States
- State: New York
- County: Ontario
- Incorporated: 1812

Government
  - Type: Town Council
  - Town Supervisor: Jack Marren (R)
  - Town Council: Members' List: • Jeffrey P. Cody (R); • John Palomaki (D); • John Accorso (D); • Jack R. Dianetti (R)

Area
  - Total: 35.93 sq mi (93.06 km^{2})
  - Land: 35.92 sq mi (93.03 km^{2})
  - Water: 0.012 sq mi (0.03 km^{2})
- Elevation: 768 ft (234 m)

Population (2020)
  - Total: 15,969 ▲
  - Estimate (2021): 15,957
  - Density: 411/sq mi (158.8/km^{2})
- Time zone: UTC-5 (Eastern (EST))
  - Summer (DST): UTC-4 (EDT)
- ZIP: 14564
- Area code: 585
- FIPS code: 36-29640
- GNIS feature ID: 0970103
- Website: https://www.townofvictorny.gov/

Victor (Seneca: Tganödagë:ën) is an incorporated town in Ontario County, New York, United States. The population was 15,969 at the time of the 2020 census. The town is named after Claudius Victor Boughton, an American hero of the War of 1812.

The Town of Victor contains a village, also called Victor. The town is in the northwest corner of Ontario County and is southeast of Rochester. Victor is part of the Greater Rochester area; Victor's strategic location led to extensive suburban growth in the late 20th and early 21st century. Victor is the largest of Rochester's suburbs to be located outside of Monroe County, the home of more than two-thirds of the Greater Rochester population. The Village of Victor is 12 miles (19 km) from the head of Canandaigua Lake, the fourth largest of the Finger Lakes.

== History ==
An important Seneca village, known as Gannagaro or Ganondagan (Seneca: Tganödagë:ën), was located within the area of this town. The tribe abandoned the village and the area about it after being severely attacked in 1687 by French invaders from Canada. They were trying to control the lucrative fur trade.

In 2015, New York opened a museum and cultural center on the grounds of the Ganondagan State Historic Site, established in 1987. The Seneca Art & Culture Center at Ganondagan will use art, history and education, drawn from oral history, written documents, and archeological evidence, to tell the story of the Haudenosaunee (Iroquois) people, and specifically the Seneca nation. It is the only publicly funded state historic site devoted to the Haudenosaunee. It has both Haudenosaunee and Non-Native American staff and volunteers. It gives a prominent role to Jigonhsasee, the Iroquoian woman credited as one of the founders of the Confederacy.

The Seneca were the nation that lived the furthest west in New York, anchoring that approach. They occupied the Finger Lakes area and were one of Five Nations who first made up the Haudenosaunee Confederacy. In 1722 the Haudenosaunee accepted the Tuscarora, another Iroquoian-speaking people who migrated from the Carolinas, and became the Six Nations.

Following the American Revolutionary War, the Phelps and Gorham Purchase from the Seneca included the territory of this town. Pioneer settlement by European Americans began around 1789. The Town of Victor was formed in 1812 from part of the Town of Bloomfield. The area was initially developed for agriculture.

Since the 1890s, Victor has been home to several ceramic industries. Fred M. Locke founded the Locke Insulator Manufacturing Company in the area, operating a factory there for nearly a decade before formally incorporating in 1902. The Locke company was reorganized and remains in business as Victor Insulators.

The Jeremiah Cronkite House, Cobblestone Railroad Pumphouse, Felt Cobblestone General Store, Boughton Hill, Osborne House, and Valentown Hall are listed on the National Register of Historic Places.

== Geography ==
According to the United States Census Bureau, the town has a total area of 36.0 square miles (93.1 km^{2}), of which 35.9 square miles (93.0 km^{2}) is land and 0.01 square mile (0.1 km^{2}) is water (0.03%).

The western and northern town lines are the border of Monroe County (Perinton and Mendon).

The New York State Thruway (Interstate 90) passes across the northern part of the town and intersects Interstate 490 east of Fishers. New York State Route 96 is primarily an east-west highway, but turns north to the west of Victor village. New York State Route 251 connects the western part of Victor to Monroe County. New York State Route 444 runs south from Victor village.

== Demographics ==
Historical population
Census	Pop.	Note	%±
1820	2,084		—
1830	2,265		8.7%
1840	2,393		5.7%
1850	2,230		−6.8%
1860	2,404		7.8%
1870	2,437		1.4%
1880	2,804		15.1%
1890	2,620		−6.6%
1900	2,249		−14.2%
1910	2,393		6.4%
1920	2,319		−3.1%
1930	2,424		4.5%
1940	2,437		0.5%
1950	2,640		8.3%
1960	3,295		24.8%
1970	5,071		53.9%
1980	5,784		14.1%
1990	7,191		24.3%
2000	9,977		38.7%
2010	14,275		43.1%
2020	15,969		11.9%
2021 (est.)	15,957	▼	−0.1%
U.S. Decennial Census

As of the census of 2000, there were 9,977 people, 3,685 households, and 2,741 families residing in the town. The population density was 277.6 inhabitants per square mile (107.2/km^{2}). There were 3,872 housing units at an average density of 41.6 persons/km^{2} (107.7 persons/sq mi). The racial makeup of the town was 96.34% White, 0.89% African American, 0.18% Native American, 1.17% Asian, 0.00% Pacific Islander, 0.48% from other races, and 0.93% from two or more races. 1.62% of the population were Hispanic or Latino of any race.

There were 3,685 households, out of which 36.5% had children under the age of 18 living with them, 66.0% were married couples living together, 6.0% have a woman whose husband does not live with her, and 25.6% were non-families. 20.2% of all households were made up of individuals, and 7.0% had someone living alone who was 65 years of age or older. The average household size was 2.66 and the average family size was 3.11.

In the town, the population was spread out, with 27.7% under the age of 18, 5.3% from 18 to 24, 30.4% from 25 to 44, 26.4% from 45 to 64, and 10.2% who were 65 years of age or older. The median age was 38 years. For every 100 females, there were 99.1 males. For every 100 females age 18 and over, there were 95.5 males.

The median income for a household in the town was $59,349, and the median income for a family was $71,526. Males had a median income of $51,006 versus $35,208 for females. The per capita income for the town was $31,321. 3.0% of the population and 2.3% of families were below the poverty line. Out of the total people living in poverty, 3.4% are under the age of 18 and 7.0% are 65 or older.

== Communities and locations in the Town of Victor ==
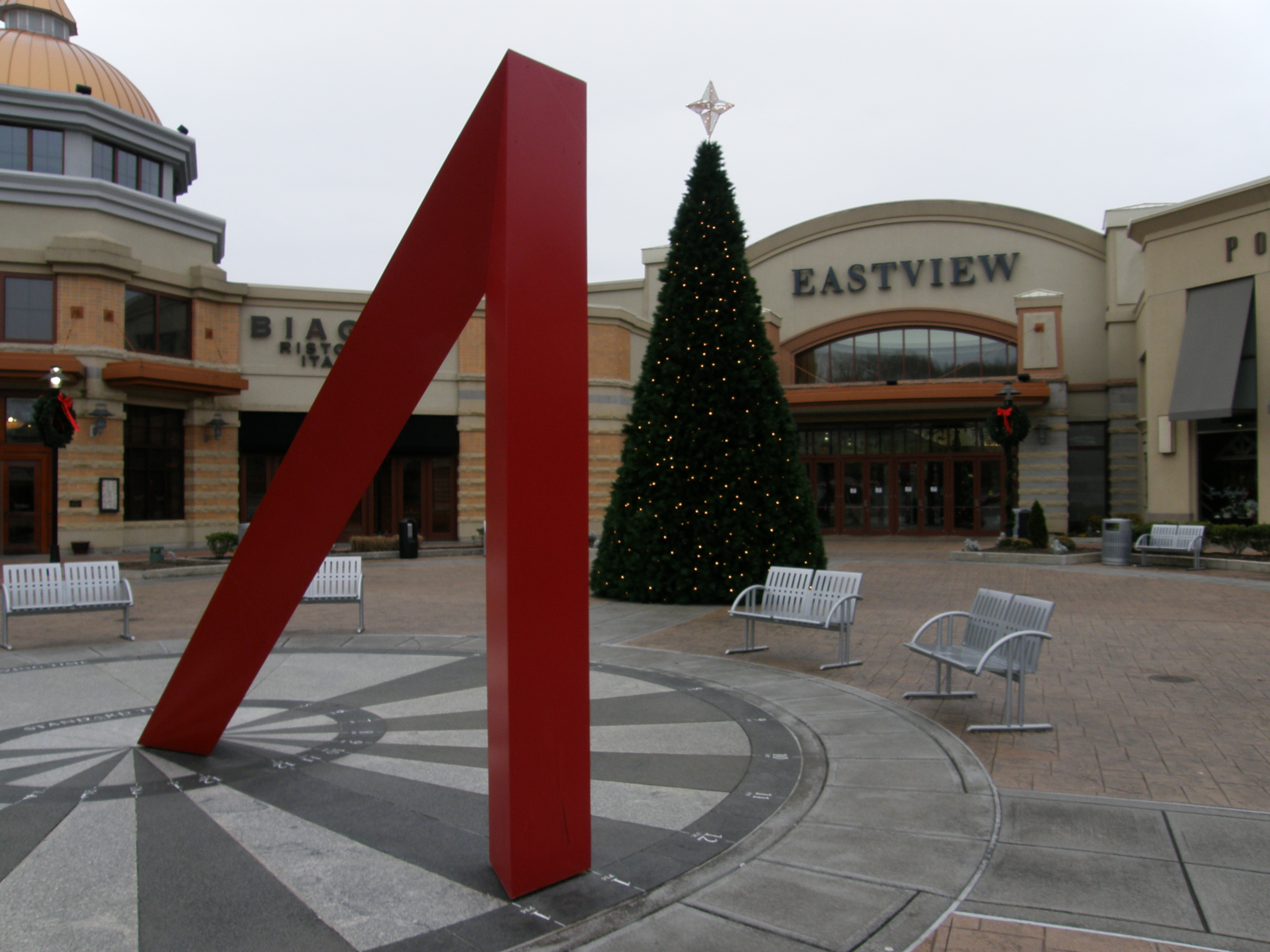
Eastview Mall

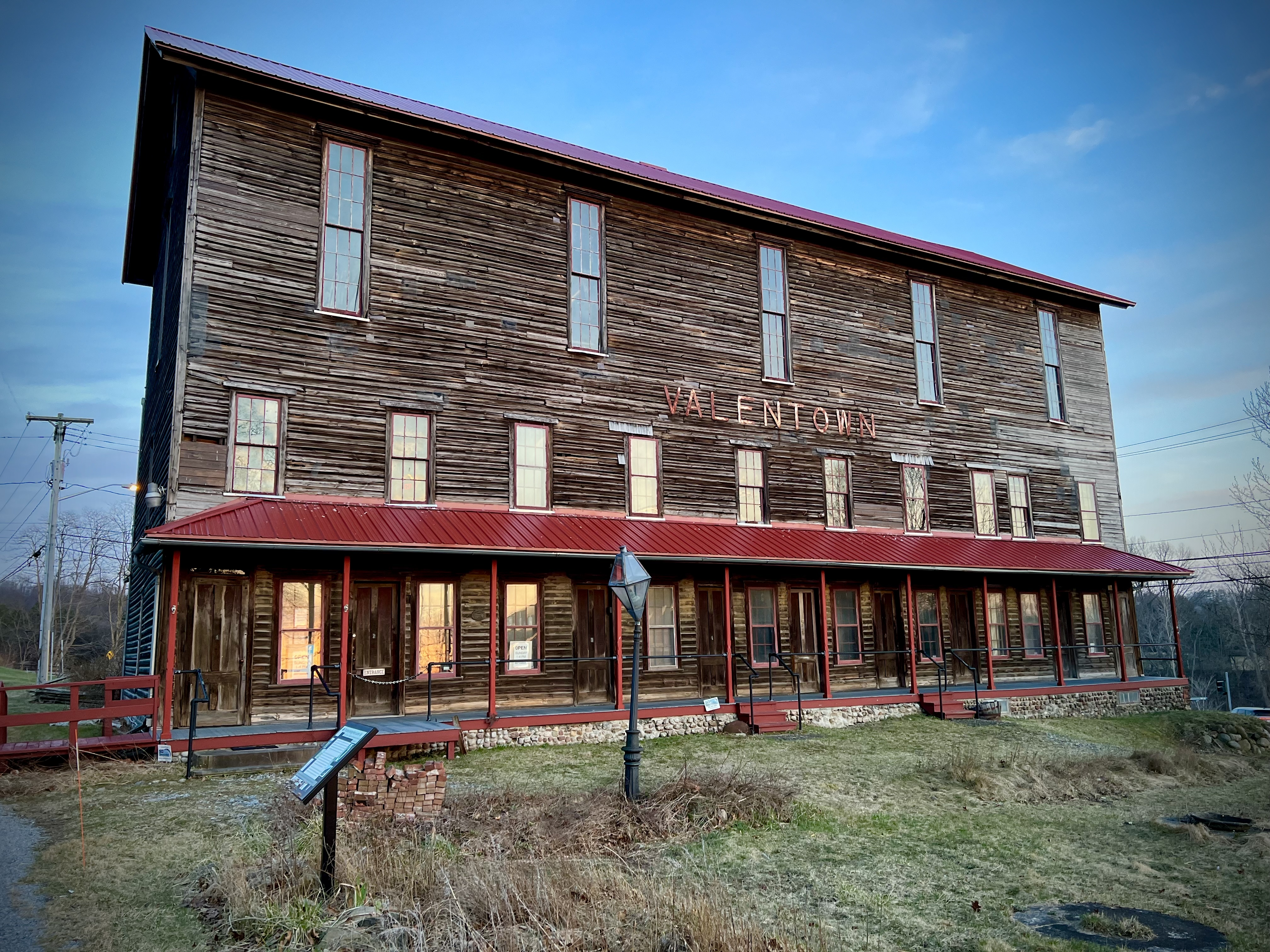
Valentown Museum

- Boughton Hill – A hamlet south of Victor village, on NY-444. This is one of the first communities to be settled in the town and was an important center until superseded by Victor village.
- East Victor (formerly "Scudderville" and "Freedom") – A hamlet east of Victor village, on NY-96. It was an early rival with Victor village for prominence in the town.
- Eastview Mall – A 1,300,000-square-foot (120,000 m^{2}) shopping center located just off New York State Thruway Exit 45 on New York State Route 96 in the northwest part of town.
- Former Fairport Reservoirs – Two adjacent reservoirs near the south town line. Now Boughton Park, a town park shared with East and West Bloomfield.
- Fishers – A hamlet in the northwest part of the town.
- Ganondagan State Historic Site – This historic Seneca village site is preserved as a state historical site. It is west of Boughton Hill.
- Motts Corners – A hamlet in the northeast part of the town on County Road 9.
- Railroad Mills – A location in the northwest part of the town.
- Victor – NY-96 goes through The Village of Victor south of the Thruway.

== Parks ==
- Boughton – Shared with the towns of East and West Bloomfield. (Permit required, from town hall.)
- Dryer Road – Athletic fields and a box sports rink; playground; multi-use trail system for hiking, mountain biking, snowshoeing and cross-country skiing.
- Fishers – Hiking, baseball, tennis.
- Ganondagan, State Historic Site.
- Harlan Fisher Park – Small in village.
- Lehigh Crossing – Hiking, fishing, biking.
- Maryfrances Bluebird Haven – Passive and hiking.
- Mead Square – In village.
- Monkey Run – Hiking.
- Paparone (undeveloped).
- Victor Municipal – Hiking, fishing, playground.
- Village on the Park – Playground

== See also ==
- Valentown Hall, a historic site located in the town of Victor
- Victor Central School District
