= Fishers, New York =

Hamlet in New York, United States

Coordinates: 43°00′31″N 77°27′53″W

Fishers is a hamlet in the northwest corner of the Town of Victor, Ontario County, New York, United States. It is a small suburb of Rochester.

The community is south of the New York State Thruway (Interstate 90).

A U. S. Post Office is located in Fishers with a ZIP code of 14453.

== Entertainment ==
Fishers is home to Fishers Park, a town park which is run by the Town of Victor. It contains tennis courts, picnic area, fishing and hiking trails.

== Schools ==
Fishers is part of the Victor Central School District.
