= Syracuse and Utica Railroad =

American railway company, 1836–1853

Overview
- Locale: Syracuse, New York to Rome, New York
- Dates of operation: 1836–1853
- Successor: New York Central Railroad

Technical
- Track gauge: 1,435 mm (4 ft 8 1/2 in)
- Length: 53 miles (85 km)

The Syracuse and Utica Railroad was a railway company in the United States. It was incorporated in 1836 and completed a line between Syracuse and Utica, New York, in 1839. The railroad was consolidated with nine other railroads in 1853 to form the first New York Central Railroad.

== History ==
The Syracuse and Utica Railroad was incorporated on May 11, 1836. As its planned route ran parallel to the Erie Canal, the state required that it pay a toll for any freight displaced from the canal. The full line, 53 miles (85 km) in length, opened on August 3, 1839. It connected with the Auburn and Syracuse Railroad in the west and the Utica and Schenectady Railroad in the east.

The Syracuse and Utica Railroad was consolidated with nine other railroads to form the first New York Central Railroad on May 1, 1853.
