= New York State Route 64 =

Highway in New York

New York State Route 64
- Map of the Finger Lakes region with NY 64 highlighted in red

Route information
- Maintained by NYSDOT
- Length: 31.06 mi (49.99 km)
- Existed: 1930–present

Major junctions
- South end: NY 21 in South Bristol
- US 20 / NY 5 in East Bloomfield
- North end: NY 96 / NY 252 in Pittsford

Location
- Country: United States
- State: New York
- Counties: Ontario, Monroe

Highway system
- New York Highways; Interstate; US; State; Reference; Parkways
← NY 63A	→ NY 65

New York State Route 64 (NY 64) is a north–south state highway in the Finger Lakes region of New York in the United States. Its southern terminus is at an intersection with NY 21 in the hamlet of Bristol Springs within the town of South Bristol, Ontario County. The northern terminus is at a junction with NY 96 and NY 252 in the village of Pittsford, Monroe County. NY 64 is a mostly two-lane highway that primarily serves as a connector between the southeastern suburbs of the city of Rochester and the Canandaigua Lake area, home to Bristol Mountain Ski Resort. Near the midpoint of the route, NY 64 has an overlap with U.S. Route 20 (US 20) and NY 5 that takes the route through the village of Bloomfield.

The majority of what is now NY 64 was originally designated as part of Route 14, an unsigned legislative route, by the New York State Legislature in 1908. In the vicinity of Bloomfield, however, Route 14 initially followed what later became NY 20C in order to access Holcomb. The alignment of Route 14 through Bloomfield was modified in 1921 to use modern NY 64 instead. When the first set of posted routes in New York were assigned in 1924, the portion of Route 14 between Mendon and Pittsford became part of NY 15. In the 1930 renumbering of state highways in New York, NY 15 was realigned to follow a new routing to the east while the Mendon–Pittsford segment of its former routing became the basis for NY 64, a new route that extended southward over the post-1921 routing of legislative Route 14 to South Bristol.

== Route description ==
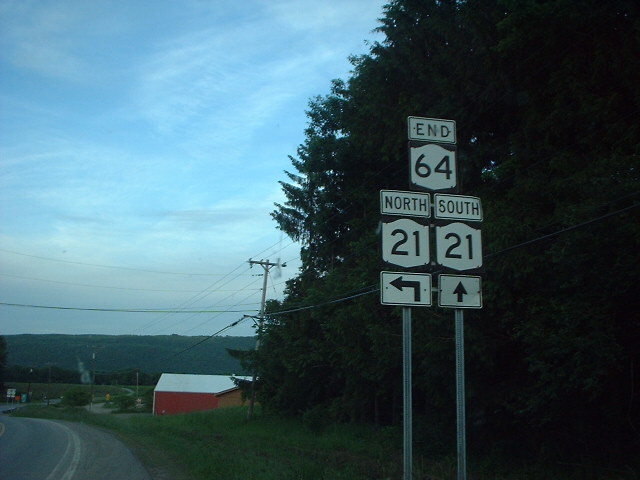
Southern terminus of NY 64 at NY 21 in South Bristol

NY 64 begins at an intersection with NY 21 on a ridge overlooking Canandaigua Lake in Bristol Springs, a hamlet of South Bristol. The route heads to the northwest as a two-lane highway, running in the base of the Bristol Valley, a lowland created by a pair of imposing mountain ranges to the east and west that is home to the Bristol Mountain Ski Resort. At the hamlet of Bristol Center (in the town of Bristol), roughly 7.5 miles (12.1 km) from Bristol Springs, the western mountains give way to flat farmland while the eastern range continues on, although to a lesser extent and a lower elevation than before. The elevation of NY 64 remains virtually unchanged, however, as it progresses northward. 1.5 miles (2.4 km) from Bristol Center, the route meets US 20A.

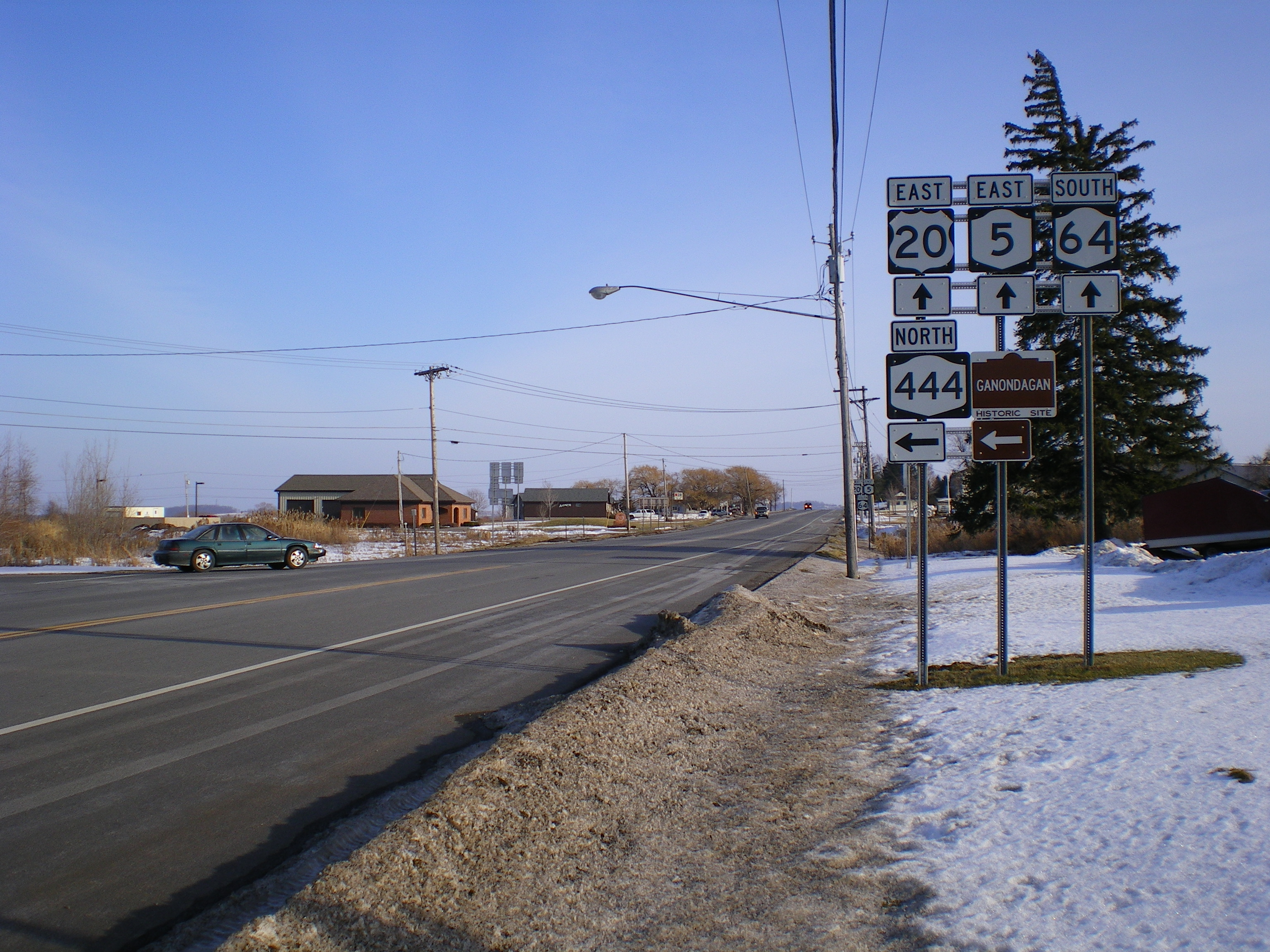
US 20 and NY 5 eastbound and NY 64 southbound at NY 444 near Bloomfield

US 20A joins NY 64 here, following the latter for about 4 miles (6 km), allowing US 20A to terminate at its parent, US 20, here concurrent with NY 5, at an intersection in East Bloomfield. At this point, NY 64 turns west onto US 20 and NY 5. The three routes head westward across mostly open fields, meeting the southern terminus of NY 444 south of the former village of Holcomb. Past the junction, which once served as the eastern terminus of NY 20C, US 20, NY 5, and NY 64 continue into the village of Bloomfield before NY 64 breaks from NY 5 and US 20 and turns northward toward Rochester once again.

A mere 50 yards (46 m) north of US 20 and NY 5, NY 64 meets the west end of Bloomfield's West Main Street at a rural intersection that was the western terminus of NY 20C. North of West Main Street, the highway curves to the northwest as it exits East Bloomfield and enters the adjacent town of West Bloomfield. In the northeast corner of the town, NY 64 passes through the hamlet of Ionia. Northwest of the community, the route breaks to the north, taking a due north alignment as it passes into Monroe County and becomes Mendon–Ionia Road. The road stays on a relatively straight path northward as it heads through the rural southern portion of the town of Mendon to the hamlet of Mendon, where NY 64 meets NY 251 in the center of the community.

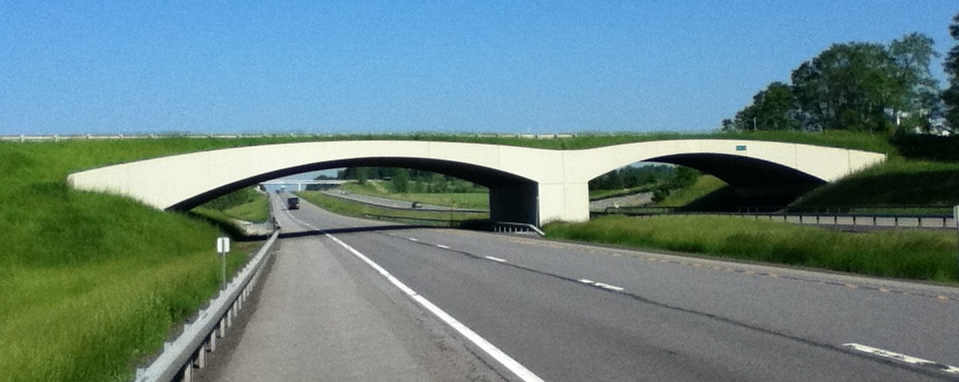
Distinctive NY 64 overpass on NY Thruway in Pittsford

On the opposite side of NY 251, NY 64 becomes Pittsford–Mendon Road. Outside of the hamlet, the highway maintains a consistent northerly alignment as it runs through slightly more populated areas of the town of Mendon and passes over the New York State Thruway (Interstate 90 or I-90). The route enters the town of Pittsford a short distance north of the Thruway, at which time NY 64 becomes Mendon Road. Within Pittsford, NY 64 passes through increasingly more populated areas as it approaches the village of Pittsford. Directly south of the village, the highway enters an intersection with South Main Street, Stone Road and Mendon Center Road at a sharp angle. NY 253 once entered this junction on Mendon Center Road and followed NY 64 into Pittsford; however, today, NY 64 continues alone onto South Main Street. The route ends just under 1 mile (1.6 km) later at the junction of South Main Street and Jefferson Road, where it meets NY 96 and NY 252.

== History ==
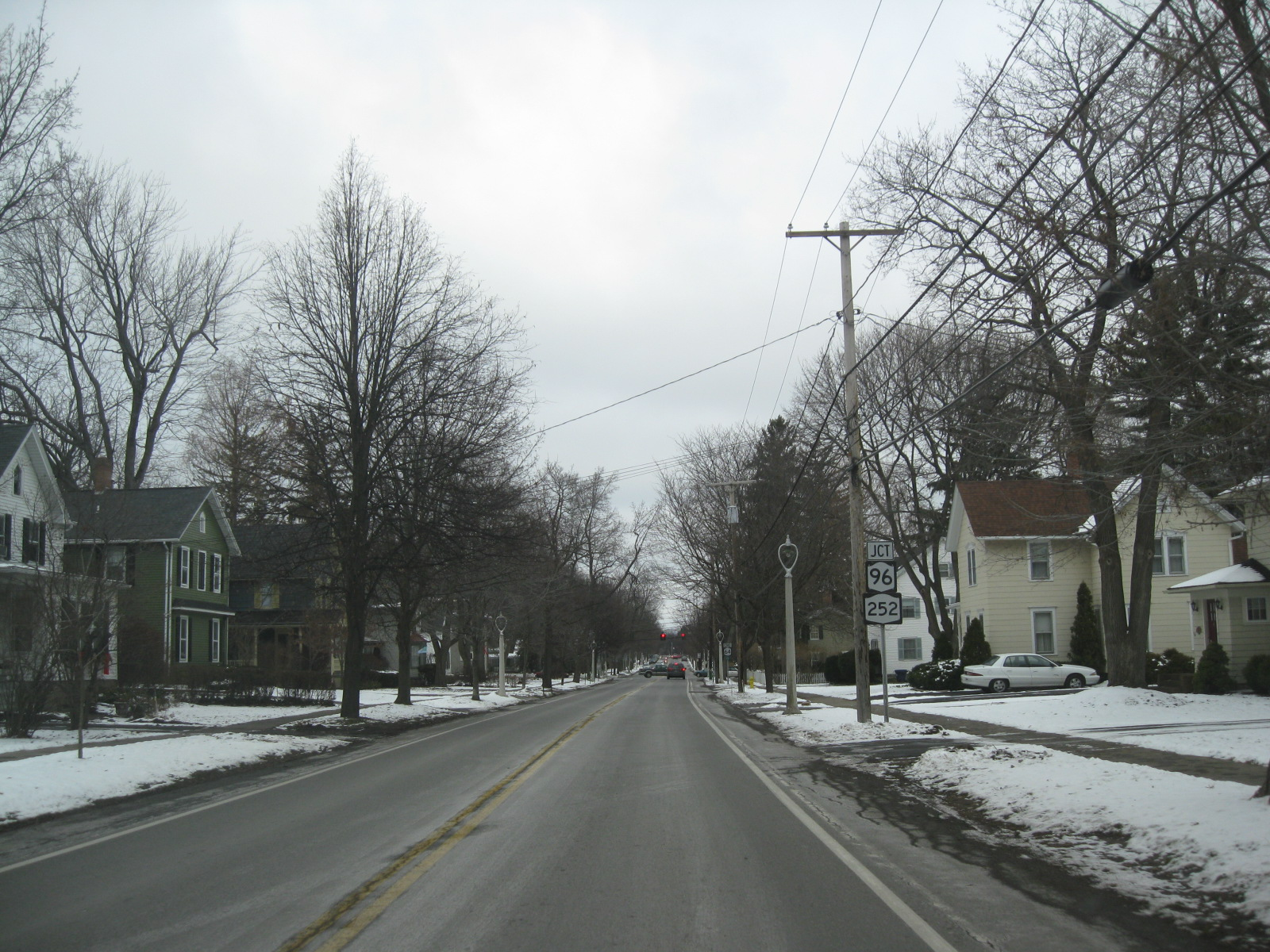
Approaching the northern terminus of NY 64 on NY 64 northbound in Pittsford

In 1908, the New York State Legislature created Route 14, an unsigned legislative route that extended from Corning to Rochester via South Bristol and Pittsford. The majority of Route 14 south of Pittsford was routed on what is now NY 64; however, in the vicinity of Bloomfield, Route 14 broke from modern NY 64 and used what later became NY 20C to access Holcomb. At the same time, the portion of current NY 64 that overlaps with US 20 and NY 5 was included in Route 6, a cross-state highway connecting Albany to Buffalo. On March 1, 1921, Route 14 was altered to bypass Holcomb to the south on what is now NY 64.

When the first set of posted routes in New York were assigned in 1924, the portion of legislative Route 14 between Mendon and Pittsford became part of NY 15, a route that mostly followed the current alignment of NY 96 from Owego to Rochester. Between Victor and Pittsford, however, NY 15 strayed from the modern routing of NY 96 and followed what is now NY 251 to Mendon. At the same time, the segment of legislative Route 6 in East Bloomfield became part of both NY 5 and NY 5A. The NY 5A designation was replaced along this stretch with NY 7 by 1926, which in turn was replaced by US 20 in 1927. In the 1930 renumbering of state highways in New York, NY 15 was realigned to bypass Mendon to the northeast by way of the current alignment of NY 96 between Victor and Pittsford. The former alignment of NY 15 from Pittsford to Mendon became part of NY 64, a new route that extended south to South Bristol over the post-1921 routing of legislative Route 14. The 4-mile (6.4 km) portion of NY 64 between Vincent and South Bloomfield became part of US 20A c. 1939, allowing the route to reconnect to US 20 at South Bloomfield.

NY 64 briefly extended north of the village of Pittsford during the 1950s and 1960s. In the mid-1950s, NY 96 was realigned onto the new Eastern Expressway from Bushnell's Basin to NY 31F near East Rochester. From there, NY 96 followed modern NY 31F west to East Avenue, where it rejoined its original alignment. The portion of NY 96's original surface routing between the village of Pittsford and what is now NY 31F became part of an extended NY 64. A northwest extension of the freeway to what is now the Can of Worms was completed c. 1957 as a realignment of NY 96, resulting in another extension of NY 64 along East Avenue to the eastern edge of Rochester. NY 64 and NY 96 were restored to their pre-1950s alignments c. 1961 when the Eastern Expressway was designated as I-490.

== Major intersections ==
County	Location	mi	km	Destinations	Notes
Ontario	South Bristol	0.00	0.00	NY 21	Southern terminus; hamlet of Bristol Springs
Ontario	Bristol	9.60	15.45	US 20A west – Honeoye	Southern terminus of US 20A / NY 64 overlap; hamlet of Vincent
Ontario	East Bloomfield	13.36	21.50	US 20 east / NY 5 east / US 20A west	Eastern terminus of US 20 / NY 5 / NY 64 overlap; northern terminus of US 20A / NY 64 overlap; eastern terminus of US 20A
Ontario	East Bloomfield	14.62	23.53	NY 444 north – Downtown Bloomfield	Southern terminus of NY 444; former eastern terminus of NY 20C
Ontario	East Bloomfield	16.43	26.44	US 20 west / NY 5 west	Western terminus of US 20 / NY 5 / NY 64 overlap
Ontario	East Bloomfield	16.46	26.49	West Main Street	Former western terminus of NY 20C
Monroe	Mendon	24.70	39.75	NY 251	
Monroe	Town of Pittsford	30.35	48.84	NY 943C (Mendon Center Road)	Former eastern terminus of NY 253; eastern terminus of unsigned NY 943C
Monroe	Village of Pittsford	31.06	49.99	NY 96 / NY 252 west	Northern terminus, eastern terminus of NY 252
1.000 mi = 1.609 km; 1.000 km = 0.621 mi: Concurrency terminus
