= Sucker Brook (Canandaigua Lake) =

- Etymology: From White Sucker fish

Location
- Country: United States
- State: New York
- Region: Finger Lakes
- County: Ontario
- Town: Canandaigua

Physical characteristics
- Source: Wetland near Bliss and Wool House roads
  - coordinates: 42°51′19″N 77°19′58″W
  - elevation: 1,020 ft (310 m)
- Mouth: Canandaigua Lake
  - coordinates: 42°52′26″N 77°16′32″W
  - elevation: 680 ft (210 m)
- Length: 6 mi (9.7 km), NE, SE
- Basin size: 6.9 mi^{2} (18 km^{2})
- Discharge
  - location: mouth
  - average: 14 cu ft/s (0.40 m^{3}/s)
  - minimum: 5 cu ft/s (0.14 m^{3}/s)
  - maximum: 300 cu ft/s (8.5 m^{3}/s)

Sucker Brook is a short stream that drains into the northwest corner of Canandaigua Lake, New York, United States. It flows in a 6-mile (9.7 km) hairpin-shaped course from uplands in the town of Canandaigua to the lake, in the eponymous city. The name comes from the white sucker fish abundant in its waters.

It may have originally drained into another body of water prior to the formation of the lake, which changed its outlet through stream piracy. Lime dissolved in its waters from the limestone bedrock it flows over creates rare oncolites known locally as "water biscuits' on the north shore of Skenoh Island, one of two islands in the 11 Finger Lakes, near its mouth. The brook has seen some pollution issues in recent years, as the channel at its mouth has been widened to increase recreational opportunities available in the area.

== Course ==
Sucker Brook rises in a wooded area southeast of the intersection of Bliss and Wool House roads in the Town of Canandaigua, in the uplands 1.5 miles (3 km) west of the lake, 1,020 feet (310 m) above sea level. It flows northwesterly at first, crossing under Bliss amid large expanses of cultivated land. It bends north and then northeast at a smaller wooded area with two farm ponds, following the slope of the land.

Following channels between fields and receiving the runoff from those fields through even smaller channels between them, the stream trends more to the east. After crossing under Hickox Road its banks become noticeably forested as it enters another large wooded wetland where it receives an unnamed tributary from the east. The combined stream then flows north, under Bristol Road (Ontario County Route 32).

From there it descends more sharply again, losing 80 feet (24 m) of elevation by the time it reaches its next crossing, Buffalo Road (New York State Route 5 and U.S. Route 20). The channel continues to be lined with trees, its irregular course forming the boundaries of the fields it passes through. After its next crossing, Buffalo Street Extension, it curves more to the northeast again, then northwest, briefly returning to the northeast just before it goes under North Bloomfield Road (County Route 30). This costs the stream another 100 feet (30 m) of elevation.

Here Sucker Brook makes its most significant change of direction. It turns to the east, then bends southeast, paralleling the bases of some nearby hills to the south, and crosses under North Bloomfield a second time. Then it flows almost straight southwest, closely paralleling the western boundary of the City of Canandaigua, recrossing Buffalo Street Extension in the process.

At Woodlawn Cemetery, it turns eastward again, following around the base of Arsenal Hill and entering the city. It turns southeast and straightens out as it crosses several streets, recrosses Routes 5 and 20 and then drains into Canandaigua Lake just west of the city pier. From West Avenue on the stream channel shows signs of having been modified. At Parrish Street it becomes wider, accommodating boat slips on either side, and its mouth has been dredged.

== Natural history ==
The brook takes its name from the white sucker fish, which enter it from the lake in April and May to spawn. They have been observed as far upstream from the lake as Woodlawn Cemetery's raceways. The eggs hatch 5–10 days after spawning, and when the fry have matured, they return to the lake. Their presence is not an indicator of the stream's environmental health, as they can tolerate poor-quality water but will also spawn in pristine water.

They are primarily bottom feeders, with the fry living off microcrustaceans, algae, and rotifers while the adults prefer larger crustaceans, insects, and snails. A survey of the brook's fishery was scheduled to be done in 2000. Other fauna found in the creek include dragonfly and crane fly larvae.

== Geology ==
Most of the brook's watershed is underlain by limestone and shale bedrock that dips gently southward. Soil is mostly glacial till. Near the mouth, in the city, Sucker Brook flows through areas of silt and clay loams. The stream's abrupt change of course back towards the lake suggests that it arose prior to the formation of the lake after the last Ice Age, flowing into another stream or body of water, until stream piracy changed its course to drain into the newly formed lake.

The interaction of the brook's outflow and the lake's counterclockwise shore currents has created Squaw Island a short distance offshore from its mouth, from deposited sediments. It is one of two islands in the 11 Finger Lakes, along with Frontenac Island off Union Springs in Cayuga Lake. Lime dissolved in the water from the bedrock has interacted with algae growing in the water to create a rare phenomenon called oncolites, small flat lime saucers around a pebble or gravel substrate known locally as "water biscuits". Research into them led the state to formally protect the island in 1918; today the state Department of Environmental Conservation lists it as a Unique Area.

== Hydrology ==
In 1999 three researchers from the State University of New York at Brockport surveyed the brook and its waters to see how polluted it might be, as neighbors of the brook in the city had been complaining about how dirty it was for some time. There is little significant industry in the watershed, but much of the land surrounding the upper section of the brook is farmed. In the past, while some spills into the creek have been of fuels, most have been waste products from winemaking, the region's signature industry. Dissolved road salt also washed into the creek from the town's highway garage, driving up chloride levels in the water. Untreated waste from livestock washed into the creek's headwaters, giving Sucker Brook the highest fecal coliform counts of any of the lake's tributaries.

The researchers recommended methods of controlling the pollution. They noted that road salt was used at a much higher rate in the Sucker Brook subwatershed than anywhere else near the lake, and that the town's salt supplies were not protected from running off into the brook. The high coliform levels, far higher than that permitted for recreational human contact, in the section that flowed through the city suggested that some sanitary sewers had been connected to the city's storm drains, a probability they called on the city to investigate.

Ten years later two of the researchers published a report on efforts to follow up on their recommendations. The town and city had coordinated their efforts along with the Ontario County Soil and Water Conservation District. A barn had been built to house the town's road salt, and the city had made some major improvements in its sewer systems. The researchers noted that there had been some reduction in chloride levels, but no more than 8%. They speculated that the high chrloride levels might be the result of decayed coliforms, suggesting despite limited data that more might need to be done.

== See also ==
- List of rivers of New York
