= East Bloomfield, New York =

- Town
- Location within the state of New York
- Coordinates: 42°53′57″N 77°25′21″W
- Country: United States
- State: New York
- County: Ontario

Government
  - Type: Town Council
  - Town Supervisor: Dorothy N. Huber (R)
  - Town Council: Members' List: • Ronald P. Hawkins (R); • Philip E. White (R); • Thomas E. Conklin (D); • Jay Mitchell (R)

Area
  - Total: 33.33 sq mi (86.33 km^{2})
  - Land: 33.19 sq mi (85.97 km^{2})
  - Water: 0.14 sq mi (0.36 km^{2})
- Elevation: 922 ft (281 m)

Population (2020)
  - Total: 3,661 ▲
  - Estimate (2021): 3,648
  - Density: 108.1/sq mi (41.75/km^{2})
- Time zone: UTC-5 (Eastern (EST))
  - Summer (DST): UTC-4 (EDT)
- ZIP codes: 14443, 14469
- Area codes: 585, formerly 716
- FIPS code: 36-21699
- GNIS feature ID: 0978915
- Website: Town website

East Bloomfield is a town in Ontario County, New York, United States. The population was 3,661 at the 2020 census.

The Town of East Bloomfield is in the western part of the county, south of Rochester.

== History ==
The area was originally the territory of the Iroquois confederacy. The Seneca village Ganondagan was destroyed by the Marquis de Denonville in 1687 as part of his campaign against the tribe. The Ganondagan State Historic Site was part of the original Town of Bloomfield, but in the present day is part of the town of Victor.

The town was part of the Phelps and Gorham Purchase.

The town was created along with the county in 1789 as "Bloomfield," but the name was changed to "East Bloomfield" after the creation of the Town of West Bloomfield in 1833. Other towns formed in 1812 from parts of East Bloomfield include Victor and Mendon, Mendon being in Monroe County.

East Bloomfield is home to the Northern Spy apple.

The East Bloomfield Historic District and George and Addison Wheeler House are listed on the National Register of Historic Places.

== Geography ==
According to the United States Census Bureau, the town has a total area of 33.3 square miles (86 km^{2}), of which 33.2 square miles (86 km^{2}) is land and 0.1 square miles (0.26 km^{2}) (0.42%) is water.

Conjoined U.S. Route 20–New York State Route 5, referred to by locals as "5 & 20", passes across the northern part of the town, running concurrently with New York State Route 64 between Bloomfield and South Bloomfield. Apart from the US 20–NY 5 overlap, NY 64 runs north-south through the town, as does U.S. Route 20A (concurrently with NY 64 south of US 20 and NY 5) and New York State Route 444.

East Bloomfield is bordered by West Bloomfield to the west, Victor to the north, Canandaigua to the east, and Bristol to the south.

The village of Bloomfield serves as the town center. Bloomfield once consisted of two adjacent villages, Holcomb and East Bloomfield. They were consolidated in 1990 into the existing village of Bloomfield.

== Demographics ==
Historical population
Census	Pop.	Note	%±
1820	3,621		—
1830	3,861		6.6%
1840	1,986		−48.6%
1850	2,262		13.9%
1860	2,163		−4.4%
1870	2,250		4.0%
1880	2,527		12.3%
1890	2,039		−19.3%
1900	1,940		−4.9%
1910	1,892		−2.5%
1920	1,715		−9.4%
1930	1,631		−4.9%
1940	1,700		4.2%
1950	1,848		8.7%
1960	2,297		24.3%
1970	3,151		37.2%
1980	3,327		5.6%
1990	3,258		−2.1%
2000	3,361		3.2%
2010	3,634		8.1%
2020	3,661		0.7%
2021 (est.)	3,648		−0.4%
U.S. Decennial Census

As of the census of 2000, there were 3,361 people, 1,215 households, and 923 families residing in the town. The population density was 101.2 inhabitants per square mile (39.1/km^{2}). There were 1,268 housing units at an average density of 38.2 per square mile (14.7/km^{2}). The racial makeup of the town was 98.45% White, 0.39% African American, 0.18% Native American, 0.21% Asian, 0.03% Pacific Islander, 0.18% from other races, and 0.57% from two or more races. Hispanic or Latino of any race were 1.04% of the population.

There were 1,215 households, out of which 35.6% had children under the age of 18 living with them, 64.7% were married couples living together, 8.0% had a female householder with no husband present, and 24.0% were non-families. 17.9% of all households were made up of individuals, and 6.7% had someone living alone who was 65 years of age or older. The average household size was 2.74 and the average family size was 3.11.

In the town, the population was spread out, with 26.8% under the age of 18, 6.7% from 18 to 24, 30.3% from 25 to 44, 25.7% from 45 to 64, and 10.6% who were 65 years of age or older. The median age was 37 years. For every 100 females, there were 95.2 males. For every 100 females age 18 and over, there were 96.3 males.

The median income for a household in the town was $52,176, and the median income for a family was $56,171. Males had a median income of $43,438 versus $24,336 for females. The per capita income for the town was $22,737. About 2.0% of families and 4.1% of the population were below the poverty line, including 2.7% of those under age 18 and 6.2% of those age 65 or over.

== Communities and locations in East Bloomfield ==
- Bloomfield – The Village of Bloomfield is in the north part of the town, located on US 20 and NY 444.
- East Bloomfield – A former village on US 20, now part of Bloomfield village.
- Holcomb – A former village on NY 444, now part of Bloomfield village.
- Mud Creek – A stream flowing northward in the eastern part of the town.
- South Bloomfield – A hamlet in the southeast part of the town on US 20A and NY 64.
- Speakers Corners – A hamlet in the southwest part of the town.

== Notable people ==
- Newton Adams (1804–1851), missionary and physician
- Nathaniel Allen (1780–1832), born in East Bloomfield, United States Congressman
- Casey Donovan (1943–1987), pornographic actor
- Amanda Jones (1835-1914), inventor, poet and spirtualist
- Ryan Lochte (1984–), Olympic Swimmer
- Byron Root Pierce (1829-1924), dentist and American Civil War veteran

== Local Churches ==
- New Hope Fellowship
- St. Bridget's Catholic Church
- St. Peter's Episcopal Church
- East Bloomfield United Methodist Church
- First Congregational Church of East Bloomfield
