= South Bristol, New York =

- Town
- Location within the state of New York
- Coordinates: 42°43′26″N 77°23′58″W
- Country: United States
- State: New York
- County: Ontario

Government
  - Type: Town Council
  - Town Supervisor: Lisa Moore (D)
  - Town Council: Members' List: • Chris Abraham (D); • Jamie Hall (D); • Meg Fuller (R); • Stephen Cowley (Nonaffiliated with a Party)

Area
  - Total: 42.02 sq mi (108.84 km^{2})
  - Land: 38.97 sq mi (100.94 km^{2})
  - Water: 3.05 sq mi (7.90 km^{2})
- Elevation: 1,122 ft (342 m)

Population (2020)
  - Total: 1,651 ▲
  - Estimate (2021): 1,649
  - Density: 40.7/sq mi (15.72/km^{2})
- Time zone: UTC-5 (Eastern (EST))
  - Summer (DST): UTC-4 (EDT)
- Zip Codes: 14424 and 14512
- Area code: 585
- FIPS code: 36-68660
- GNIS feature ID: 0979506

South Bristol is a town in Ontario County, New York, United States. The population was 1,651 at the 2020 census. The name is derived from its separation from the Town of Bristol.

The Town of South Bristol is in the southwestern part of the county. It claims to be the smallest town (by population) in the county.

== History ==
South Bristol was part of the Phelps and Gorham Purchase. Settlement commenced in the year the county was formed, 1789.

The Town of South Bristol was established in 1838 from a partition of the Town of Bristol.

The South Bristol Grange Hall 1107 and Wilder Cemetery are listed on the National Register of Historic Places.

== Geography ==
According to the United States Census Bureau, the town has a total area of 42.0 square miles (109 km^{2}), of which 39.1 square miles (101 km^{2}) is land and 3.0 square miles (7.8 km^{2}) (7.13%) is water.

The eastern town line, marked by Canandaigua Lake, is the border of Yates County.

North-south highways, NY 21 and NY 64 intersect in Bristol Springs.

Mud Creek and Mill Creek form deep north-south valleys in the town.

=== Adjacent towns and areas ===
The Town of Richmond, containing Honeoye Lake, shares South Bristol's west town line. The Town of Naples is to the south. The Town of Bristol is on the north, and the Town of Middlesex in Yates County is on the opposite shore of Canandaigua Lake.

== Demographics ==
Historical population
Census	Pop.	Note	%±
1840	1,375		—
1850	1,129		−17.9%
1860	1,216		7.7%
1870	1,218		0.2%
1880	1,327		8.9%
1890	1,225		−7.7%
1900	1,104		−9.9%
1910	965		−12.6%
1920	696		−27.9%
1930	654		−6.0%
1940	581		−11.2%
1950	542		−6.7%
1960	617		13.8%
1970	794		28.7%
1980	1,205		51.8%
1990	1,663		38.0%
2000	1,645		−1.1%
2010	1,590		−3.3%
2020	1,651		3.8%
2021 (est.)	1,649		−0.1%
U.S. Decennial Census

As of the census of 2000, there were 1,645 people, 670 households, and 469 families residing in the town. The population density was 42.1 inhabitants per square mile (16.3/km^{2}). There were 1,145 housing units at an average density of 29.3 per square mile (11.3/km^{2}). The racial makeup of the town was 98.05% White, 0.18% African American, 0.18% Native American, 0.61% Asian, 0.30% from other races, and 0.67% from two or more races. Hispanic or Latino of any race were 0.85% of the population.

There were 670 households, out of which 28.5% had children under the age of 18 living with them, 61.2% were married couples living together, 4.8% had a female householder with no husband present, and 30.0% were non-families. 22.7% of all households were made up of individuals, and 7.2% had someone living alone who was 65 years of age or older. The average household size was 2.44 and the average family size was 2.85.

In the town, the population was spread out, with 22.0% under the age of 18, 6.4% from 18 to 24, 27.4% from 25 to 44, 31.8% from 45 to 64, and 12.5% who were 65 years of age or older. The median age was 42 years. For every 100 females, there were 105.6 males. For every 100 females age 18 and over, there were 101.4 males.

The median income for a household in the town was $52,313, and the median income for a family was $56,346. Males had a median income of $40,909 versus $29,853 for females. The per capita income for the town was $26,590. About 4.7% of families and 7.9% of the population were below the poverty line, including 10.1% of those under age 18 and 2.3% of those age 65 or over.

== Communities and locations in South Bristol ==
- Academy – A location by the north town line.
- Boswell Corners – A hamlet southwest of South Bristol village at the junction of County Roads 33 and 34.
- Bristol Mountain Ski Resort – A ski resort in the center of the town.
- Bristol Springs – A hamlet southeast of South Bristol village on NY-64. It was settled in 1812.
- Covel Corners – A hamlet in the northeast part of the town by NY-21.
- Gulick – A hamlet in the southwest part of the town.
- Seneca Point – A hamlet northeast of Boswell Corners.
- South Bristol – The hamlet of South Bristol is on NY-64 and Mud Creek-.
- Woodville – A lakeside hamlet by Canandaigua Lake at the south town line on NY-21.
- WNBL Broadcast Tower – A historic broadcast tower that was used for the Rural Radio Network in the 1950s. Radio station WNBL is licensed to the town and uses the tower.

Parting of the Ways - Local Nickname for the area where Rt.21, Rt.64 meet in S. Bristol.
