= Canandaigua (town), New York =

Town in Ontario County, New York, US

Canandaigua, New York Seneca: Tganödä:gwëh
- Town
- Nickname: The Chosen Spot
- Location within the state of New York
- Coordinates: 42°51′26″N 77°18′13″W
- Country: United States
- State: New York
- County: Ontario

Government
  - Type: Town Council/Town Manager
  - Town Supervisor: Don Cotter
  - Town Manager: John Falbo
  - Town Board: Members' List: • Gary Davis; • Karen DeMay; • Terry Fennelly; • Adeline Rudolph

Area
  - Total: 62.53 sq mi (161.95 km^{2})
  - Land: 56.80 sq mi (147.10 km^{2})
  - Water: 5.73 sq mi (14.85 km^{2})
- Elevation: 997 ft (304 m)

Population (2020)
  - Total: 11,109
  - Density: 195.58/sq mi (75.51/km^{2})
- Time zone: UTC-5 (Eastern (EST))
  - Summer (DST): UTC-4 (EDT)
- ZIP codes: 14424-14425
- Area code: 585
- FIPS code: 3606912155
- GNIS feature ID: 0978785
- Website: www.townofcanandaigua.org

Canandaigua (pronounced "Ka-nuhn-day-gwuh", IPA: /ˌkænənˈdeɡwə/) is a town in Ontario County, New York, United States. The population was 11,109 at the 2020 census.

The Town of Canandaigua surrounds the City of Canandaigua at the north end of Canandaigua Lake and is southeast of Rochester.

== History ==
The town was first settled circa 1789. Canandaigua officially became a town in 1791.

The first town meeting was held in April of that year and presided over by the first supervisor, Israel Chapin. Initially, there was little distinction made between the village named Canandaigua and the Town of Canandaigua. In 1815, the Village of Canandaigua was officially established and became a city in 1913.

During the steamboat era, passenger vessels travelled on nearby Canandaigua Lake.

== Geography ==
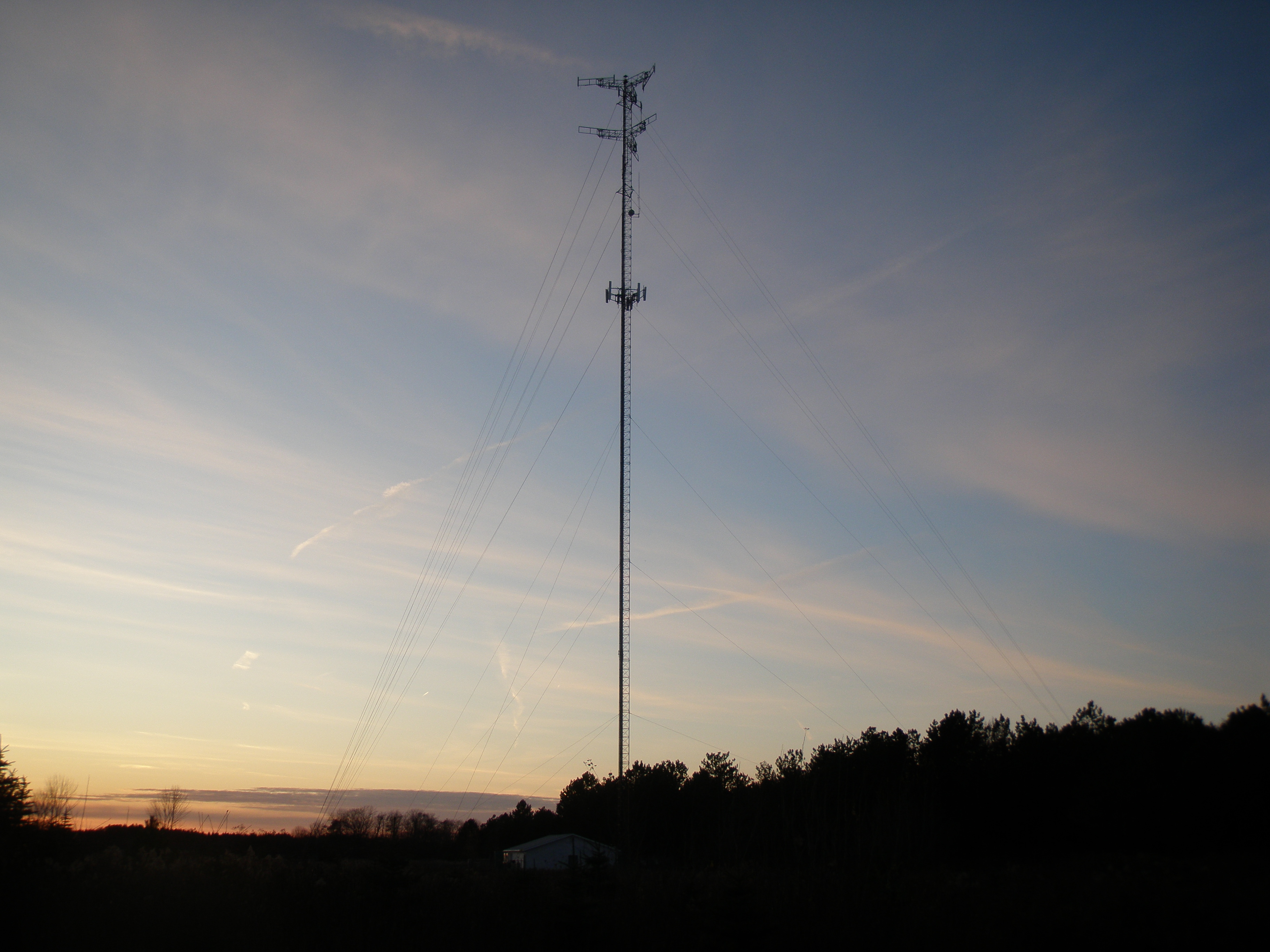
The tallest structure in Canandaigua

According to the United States Census Bureau, the Town of Canandaigua has a total area of 62.53 square miles (161.95 km^{2}), of which 56.80 square miles (147.10 km^{2}) is land and 5.74 square miles (14.85 km^{2}), approximately 9.04%, is water. The town is located at the northwestern end of Canandaigua Lake, one of the Finger Lakes.

The Town of Canandaigua is approximately 30 miles southeast of the city of Rochester and is served by the Greater Rochester International Airport. Conjoined US Route 20 and New York State Route 5 cross the north part of the Town of Canandaigua. New York State Route 21 and New York State Route 332 are important north-south highways.

=== Towns and other areas bordering the Town of Canandaigua ===
Hopewell to its east, Bristol to its south, East Bloomfield to its west, and Farmington to its north.

== Demographics ==
Historical population
Census	Pop.	Note	%±
1820	4,680		—
1830	5,162		10.3%
1840	5,652		9.5%
1850	6,143		8.7%
1860	7,075		15.2%
1870	7,274		2.8%
1880	8,363		15.0%
1890	8,229		−1.6%
1900	8,284		0.7%
1910	9,405		13.5%
1920	1,915		−79.6%
1930	1,938		1.2%
1940	3,083		59.1%
1950	4,218		36.8%
1960	4,894		16.0%
1970	5,419		10.7%
1980	6,060		11.8%
1990	7,160		18.2%
2000	7,649		6.8%
2010	10,020		31.0%
2020	11,109		10.9%
U.S. Decennial Census

As of the census of 2000, there were 7,649 people, 2,886 households, and 2,132 families residing in the town. The population density was 134.5 inhabitants per square mile (51.9/km^{2}). There were 3,281 housing units at an average density of 57.7 per square mile (22.3/km^{2}). The racial makeup of the town was 97.11% White, 0.73% Black or African American, 0.24% Native American, 0.77% Asian, 0.27% from other races, and 0.88% from two or more races. Hispanic or Latino of any race were 1.07% of the population.

There were 2,886 households, out of which 35.0% had children under the age of 18 living with them, 62.5% were married couples living together, 7.6% had a female householder with no husband present, and 26.1% were non-families. 19.1% of all households were made up of individuals, and 6.2% had someone living alone who was 65 years of age or older. The average household size was 2.62 and the average family size was 3.03.

In the town, the population was spread out, with 25.4% under the age of 18, 6.9% from 18 to 24, 27.3% from 25 to 44, 28.1% from 45 to 64, and 12.3% who were 65 years of age or older. The median age was 40 years. For every 100 females, there were 97.9 males. For every 100 females age 18 and over, there were 95.9 males.

The median income for a household in the town was $57,978, and the median income for a family was $65,170. Males had a median income of $41,302 versus $28,191 for females. The per capita income for the town was $26,586. About 2.3% of families and 5.3% of the population were below the poverty line, including 3.6% of those under age 18 and 10.2% of those age 65 or over.

== Notable people ==
- Humphrey Bogart - Bogart's parents owned a cottage (called Willow Brook) on Canandaigua Lake (Seneca Point area), where the family spent several summers when Humphrey was a boy.
- Gideon Granger - U.S. Postmaster General
- Scott Greene - Former NFL player (Carolina Panthers) and Michigan State Fullback
- Michael Park - Broadway star (Smokey Joe's Café)

== Communities and locations in the Town of Canandaigua ==
- Academy – A hamlet at the southern border of the town on NY-21.
- Arsenal Hill – A hamlet at the western border of the City of Canandaigua.
- Centerfield – A hamlet in the northwest part of the town on US-20.
- Cheshire – A hamlet in the south part of the town on NY-21.
- Four Winds Corners – A location in the northwest part of the town on US-5 and US-20.
- Grange Landing – A lakeside location in the southeast part of the town.
- Padelford – A hamlet by the north town line on County Road 8.
- Skenoh Island – An island in the north end of Canandaigua Lake.
