= Wilder Cemetery =

Historic cemetery in New York, United States

- U.S. National Register of Historic Places
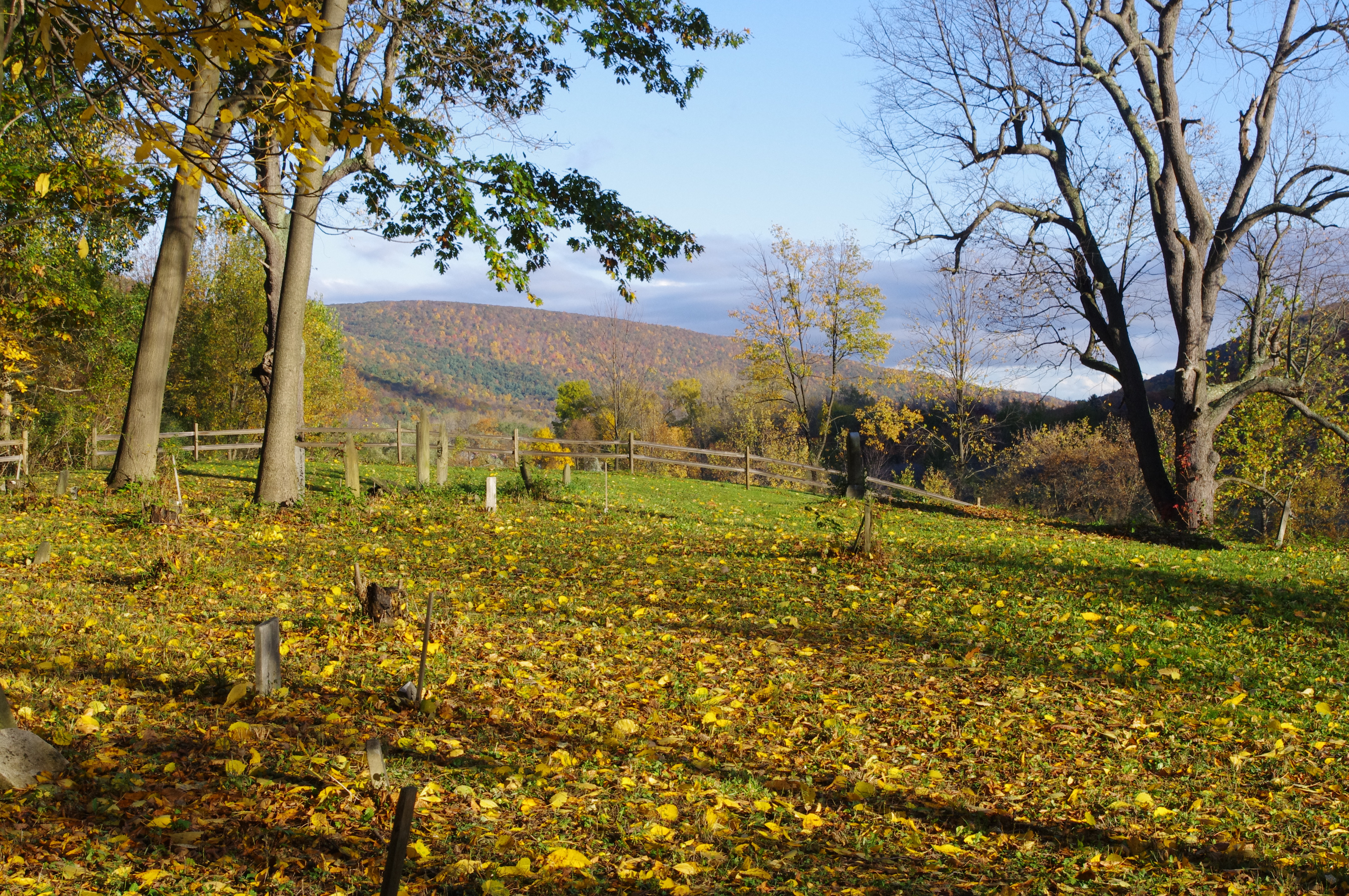

- Location within New York Location within the United States
- Location: NY 64, South Bristol, New York
- Coordinates: 42°44′8″N 77°23′53″W
- Area: 1 acre (0.40 ha)
- NRHP reference No.: 03000130
- Added to NRHP: March 23, 2003

Wilder Cemetery is a historic cemetery located at South Bristol in Ontario County, New York. The cemetery was established in 1801 and contains about 60 stones dating from 1801 to 1900. It includes the graves of many of the early settlers of the crossroads hamlet of Mud Creek, a long gone settlement established by Gameliel Wilder in 1788.

It was listed on the National Register of Historic Places in 2003.
