= Bristol Mountain Ski Resort =

Ski area in New York, United States

Bristol Mountain
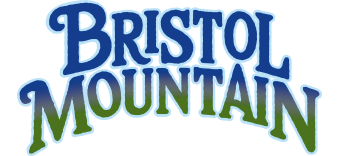

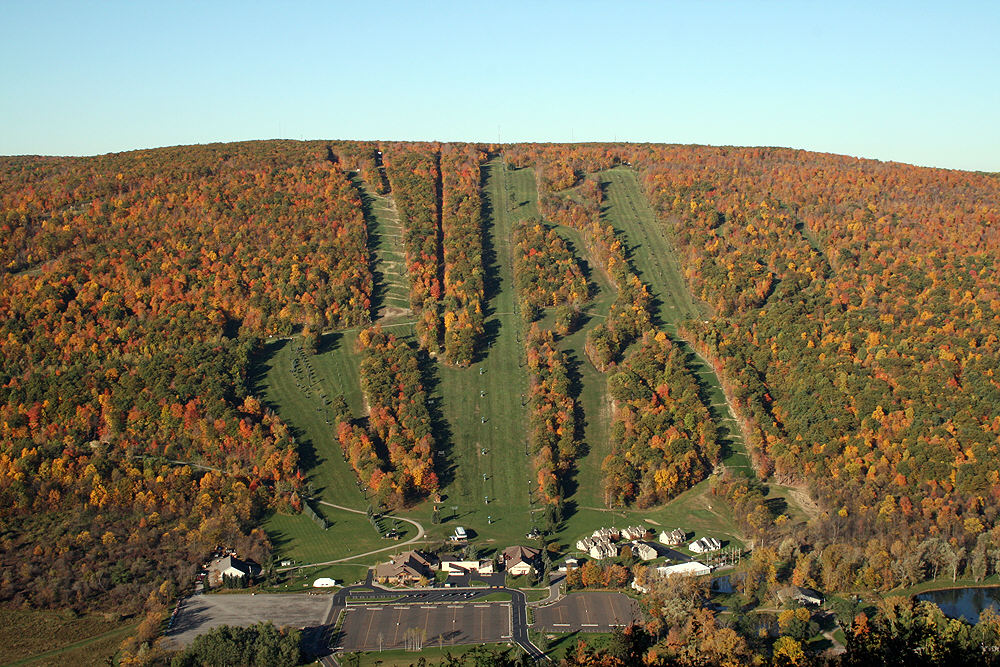
- Bristol Mountain in autumn 2009
- Interactive map of Bristol Mountain
- Location: Bristol Mountain, 5662 NY 64
- Nearest city: Canandaigua, New York 14424
- Coordinates: 42.745°N 77.404444°W
- Vertical: 1,150 feet (350 m)
- Top elevation: 2,150 feet (660 m)
- Base elevation: 1,000 feet (300 m)
- Skiable area: 160 acres (0.65 km^{2})
- Trails: 35
- Longest run: 2 miles (3.2 km)
- Lift system: 5 chairlifts (two detachable high-speed), one surface lift
- Lift capacity: 10,200 passengers/hr not including surface lift (1,500 pph)
- Terrain parks: One advanced and one beginner
- Snowfall: 130 inches (330 cm)
- Snowmaking: Near 100%
- Night skiing: Near 100%
- Website: bristolmountain.com

Bristol Mountain, formally known as Bristol Mountain Winter Resort, is a ski resort located in South Bristol, New York, in the Finger Lakes region. It is located 30 miles (48 km) from the center of Rochester, New York, the nearest major city to the resort, and about 10 miles (16 km) from Canandaigua on NY 64.

Bristol Mountain features many trails ranging from easiest (green circle) to difficult (double black diamonds). Bristol Mountain has a vertical rise of 1,200 feet (370 m), claiming to have the highest vertical of any ski resort between the Rocky Mountains & the Adirondacks. Bristol also offers two terrain parks and cross country skiing at the resort's summit. Also at the bottom is a ski shop and rental facility. Bristol Mountain Resort operates Bristol Mountain Aerial Adventures & Zip Line Canopy Tour, Roseland Waterpark, and Roseland Wake Park.

In January 2018, two athletes who grew up in the Bristol Mountain Freestyle Program were named to the 2018 U.S. Olympic Freestyle Team: Morgan Schild (Freestyle Moguls) and Jonathon Lillis (Freestyle Aerials). Both learned their sport early under the direction of Bristol Mountain Freestyle Coach John Kroetz.

In February 2022, Christopher Lillis, the younger brother of Jonathon Lillis, won a gold medal in mixed team aerials at the 2022 Winter Olympics in Beijing. He returned to compete in aerials at the 2026 Winter Olympics in Italy. Bristol Mountain's water ramp facility, used for off-season aerial training, is one of the few such facilities in the United States; the resort's freestyle program has continued to develop young skiers pursuing Olympic-level competition.

As of 2010, the resort has two high-speed detachable chairlifts. The Comet Express lift was installed for the 1999/2000 season and the Galaxy Express for the 2009/2010 season. Both make a full pass in about four minutes. In the autumn they offer Fall Sky Rides using the Comet Express High-Speed Quad chairlift slowed to take 15–20 minutes. Once at the top the riders may stay on and ride, hike down the trails, or reembark at the top. The Bristol Mountain Aerial Adventure Park, a high ropes course at the top of the mountain consisting of various climbing obstacles and zip lines, was added in 2014.

== History ==
Bristol Mountain was established in 1964 after the land was bought in South Bristol, New York, by Fred Sarkis. 50 of 360 acres (1.5 km^{2}) was cleared, the base lodge built for the December 12 opening. Snowmaking capabilities and a new lift were added in 1965. In 1967, then-Senator Robert F. Kennedy skied at Bristol. In 1968 Bristol Mountain was the world's largest illuminated ski resort. By the 1970s, Bristol was getting over 100,000 skiers per year and opened seven days a week. They progressively made snowmaking improvements and by 1985 they had 100 percent coverage and guaranteed over 100 days of skiing per season. Water is drawn from retention ponds fed by Mud Creek, a tributary to Ganargua Creek.

In 1969 the rate for skiing was seven dollars, with four dollar nights. Even then they had the longest vertical drop between the Adirondacks and the Rockies. However, back then they only claimed the drop to be 1,000 instead of 1,200 feet. Surprisingly, they were open later then, closing at 10:30 instead of 10:00; further reduced to 9:00 pm since 2019.

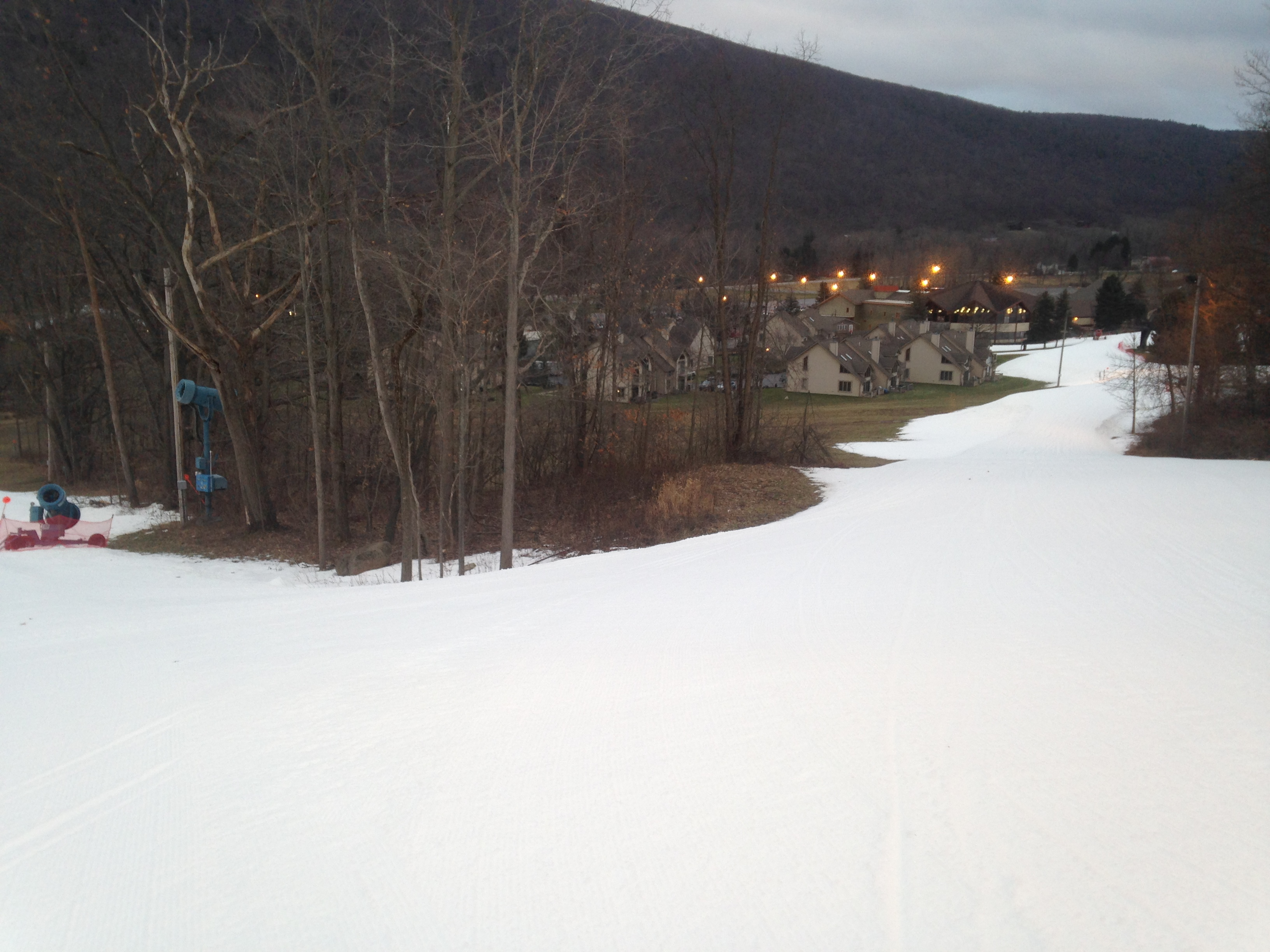
Housing at base of mountain

In 1999, the first modern chairlift was added, the Comet Express high speed detachable lift, which is now the main lift that allows access to nearly all trails.

In 2009–2010, the new high speed detachable chairlift (Galaxy Express High Speed Quad) was added. A new trail, Lower North Star, which ends at the bottom of the Galaxy chairlift was added for the 2010–2011 season. The new lift replaces an older, non-detachable, lift that started halfway up the mountain in the same place. The new trail is 2,600 feet long and 120 feet wide, adding a little over seven acres to the mountain.

For the summer of 2014 Bristol Mountain Aerial Adventures was introduced. It is a three-acre aerial park consisting of 7 challenging courses with nearly 100 tree to tree elements and 10 zip lines, situated within the forest canopy at the summit of the mountain. There is also a dedicated kids course for ages 4–7. This season is from May to November which enables Bristol Mountain to operate as a year-round attraction.

=== Rural Radio Network ===
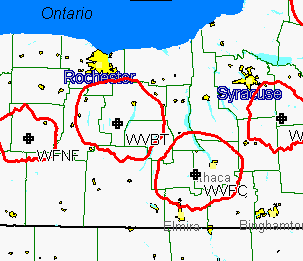
Bristol Mountain transmitter coverage map, second from left.

Bristol Mountain transmitter

The summit of Bristol Mountain, also known as Worden Hill, has been a broadcasting site for the Rural Radio Network since 1948, before the ski resort was ever formed. The station now known as WAIO signed on June 6, 1948, as WVBT, licensed to Bristol Center, New York, and transmitting from Bristol Mountain on 101.9 MHz. It was the next-to-last link in the Rural Radio Network chain of FM stations broadcasting to farmers across upstate New York. WVBT changed call letters to WRRE and changed frequency to 95.1 in the early 1950s.

When the Rural Radio Network became the Ivy Network under new owners in 1960, WRRE became WMIV. It would retain those calls under the network's next identity, the Christian Broadcasting Network (CBN), broadcasting religious programming from studios in Ithaca between 1968 and 1981. WMIV was sold to Empire Broadcasting and in early 1982, it changed format to adult standards and its call letters to WYLF. This station operated from a studio in a converted house on NY 332 in Farmington.

On July 28, 1986, WYLF was sold and became WZSH. On December 26, 1991, WZSH became WRQI, "Rock-It 95," programming a rock format. In 1993, Rock-It 95 added the syndicated Howard Stern Show to its lineup, bringing the station attention and ratings in the larger Rochester market. WRQI made several attempts to improve its main signal on 95.1 as well, briefly moving from its historic Bristol Mountain site to a tower in Farmington owned by Rochester Telephone Company, but was forced to return to Bristol after interference complaints from the tower's neighbors.

On April 21, 1995, WRQI became WNVE, "The Nerve," a modern rock/alternative station. In 2001, WNVE left its Bristol Mountain transmitter site for the last time, changing city of license from South Bristol to Honeoye Falls, New York, in a swap with sister station WLCL (107.3), which took the South Bristol city of license and the Bristol Mountain transmitter site. On July 4, 2004, Clear Channel moved WNVE from 95.1 to the lesser Bristol Mountain 107.3 signal. Replacing it on 95.1 was the former 107.3 classic rock format, "The Fox," with new call letters WFXF. The Bristol Mountain station now broadcasts on 107.3 as WNBL, an 80s hits music station.

== Statistics ==
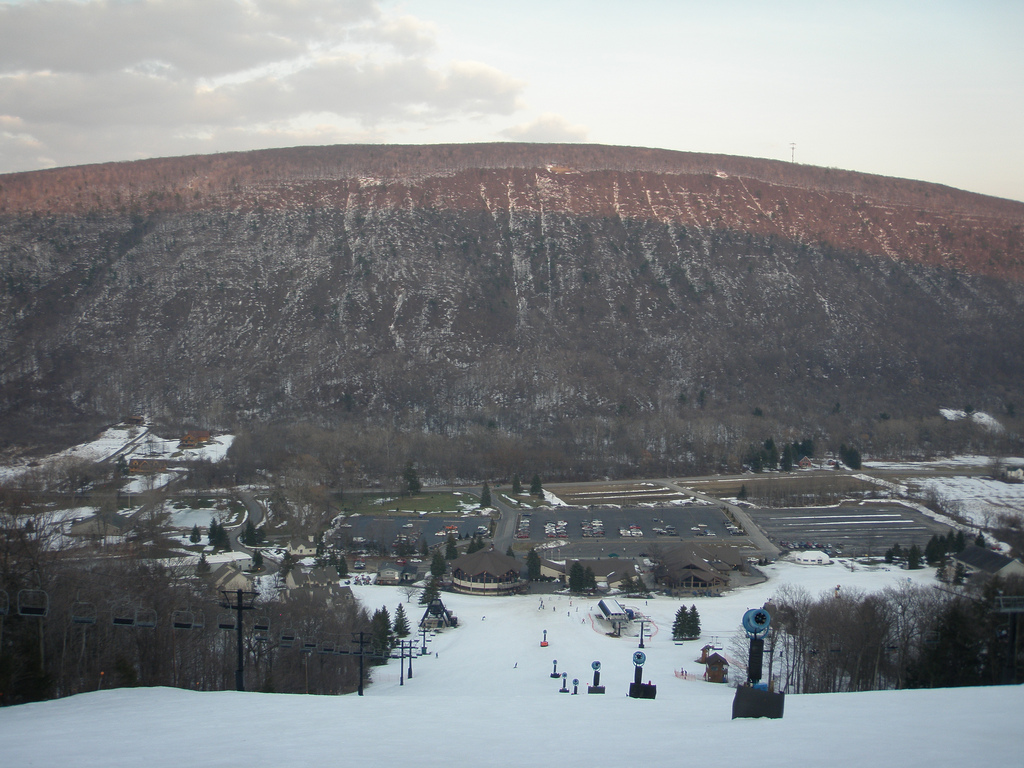
View from halfway up "Rocket Run" main trail

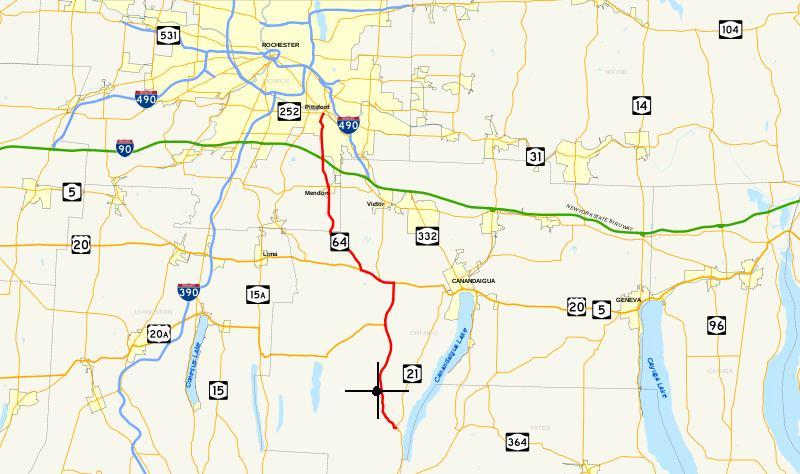
Bristol Mountain location

While Bristol is often claimed to have had 160 skiable acres, Bristol states that with the addition of the latest trail they are up to 138 skiable acres. Bristol's new detachable chairlift, the Galaxy high speed quad, will only run during peak times such as afternoons and weekends. Bristol Mountain usually has a winter operating season of about four months (December to March), sometimes opening by late November and closing sometime in April. Early and late in the season only a few trails and lifts are open. In 2010, they opened on December 5, but only the Comet Express lift was running and only Rocket Run was open, from noon to four pm.

Trails: 34; 33% Novice; 49% Intermediate; 18% Advanced

Chairlifts (see heading below for additional information):

- Galaxy Express High-Speed Quad (new for 2009/2010)
- Comet Express High-Speed Quad
- Morning Star Quad
- Rocket Triple
- Sunset Double

Surface lifts:

- Lunar Launch Magic Carpet

Vertical: 1,200 feet (370 m)

Summit elevation: 2,200 feet (670 m)

Skiable acres: 160

Average annual snowfall: 120 inches

Night skiing: 96% of the trails have trail lighting

Snowmaking: 97% of terrain has snowmaking capabilities (all trails except Quantum Leap)

Bristol Mountain relies heavily on their snowmaking capabilities during the snow season. During peak times, they use millions of gallons of water per day, megawatts of electricity, and about 20,000 cu ft (570 m^{3}) of compressed air at 90 PSI per minute.

== Chairlifts ==
Bristol currently has installed 5 total, including two high speed detachable chairlifts. There is also a surface lift (conveyor lift) to a beginner slope known as Launching Pad which only rises 60 feet.

=== Galaxy Express High-Speed Quad ===
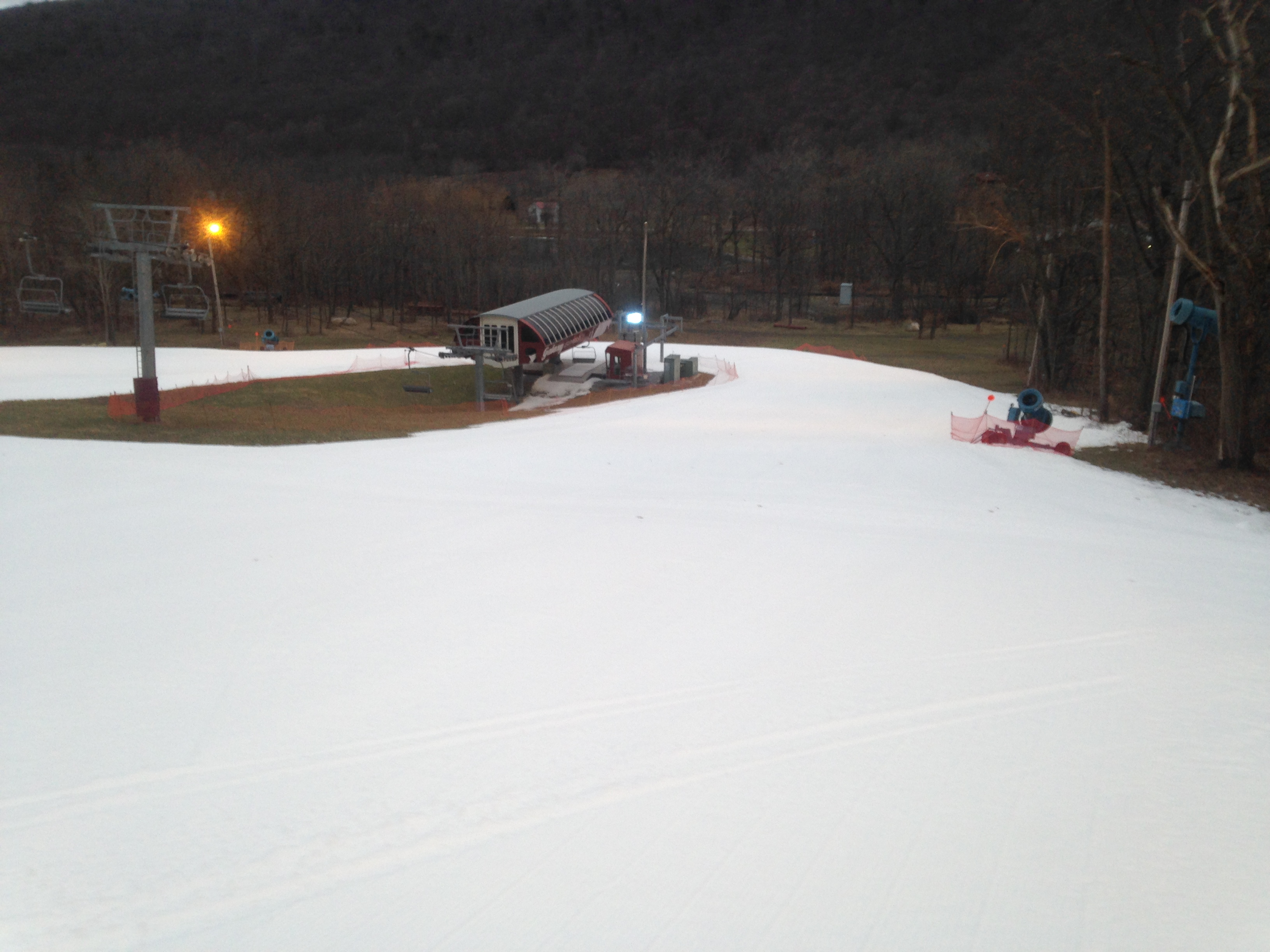
Galaxy quad

Installed in 2009, the Galaxy Express is the mountain's newest lift. It is a detachable high speed quad chairlift manufactured by Doppelmayr CTEC and installed at the base of Lower Galaxy on the northern side of the mountain. The lift services intermediate to advanced terrain on the "Galaxy-side" of the mountain. On off-peak days, the lift is often closed due to the low number of skiers and snowboarders on the mountain, especially since the Comet Express lift can provide access to the northern trails. The ride takes a little over four minutes and the lift has a capacity of 2,000 passengers per hour. The ride up takes passengers through the woods beside Lower Galaxy and then over the skiable area of Upper Galaxy. Replaces an older non-detachable lift that started at midpoint of Galaxy.

=== Comet Express High-Speed Quad ===
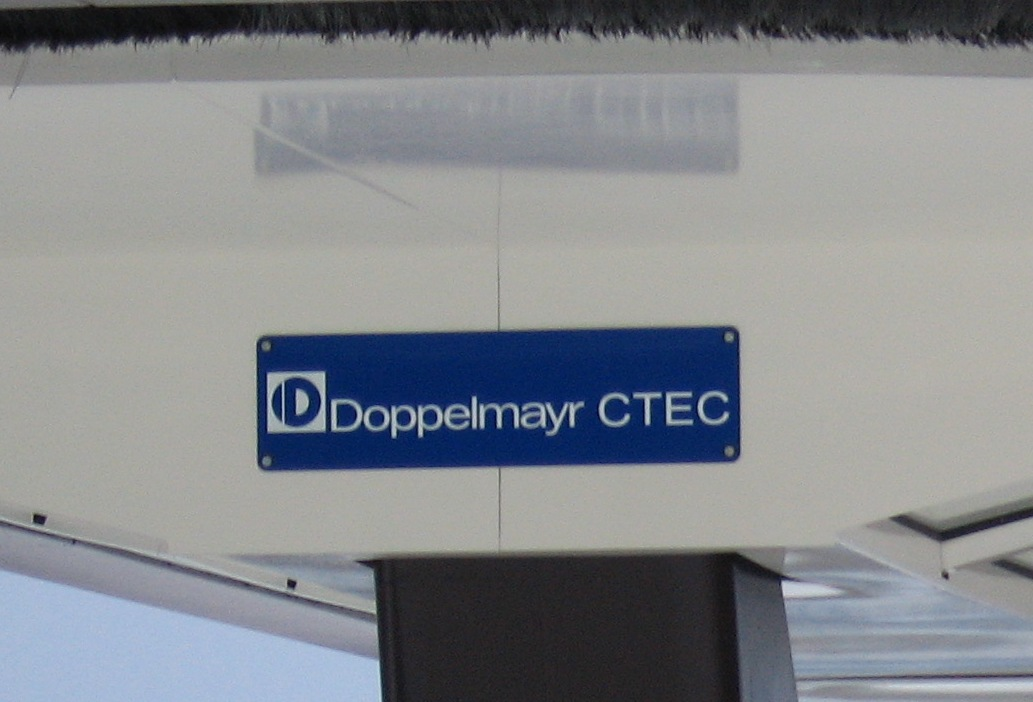
A Doppelmayr CTEC detachable high-speed quad similar to the Galaxy Express lift installed at Bristol.

Installed at the base of Lower Rocket in 1999, this lift is by far the most popular lift at the mountain. Like the Galaxy Express, it is a detachable high speed quad chairlift, but was manufactured by Garaventa CTEC (now Doppelmayr CTEC). The lift services all terrain at Bristol (ranging from easy to expert) and provides access to most of the trails at Bristol. Transporting passengers at a rate of 2,000 per hour, the ride takes a little over four minutes from base to summit. The ride takes passengers over Outer Orbit (black diamond) and Comet (double-black diamond race trail).

=== Morning Star Quad ===
A fixed-grip quad chairlift installed mid-mountain that provides guests access to easy to intermediate trails and a terrain park. The lift was manufactured and installed by Garaventa CTEC in 2000. With a 600-foot vertical rise, the ride takes about eight minutes. The lift carries 2,000 passengers per hour over the Morning Star Trail.

=== Rocket Triple ===
A fixed-grip triple chairlift installed at the base of Lower Rocket that provides guests access to intermediate to advanced trails. It was manufactured by CTEC and installed in 1984. It was later on removed in 1999 - then rebuilt and relocated in the summer of 2000. It carries 1,800 passengers per hour on its 12-minute ride from base to summit.

=== Sunset Double ===
A fix-gripped double chairlift installed at the base of Sunset that provides guests access to easy to intermediate/advanced terrain (depending on whether Challenger is open or closed). It was refurbished and reinstalled by CTEC in 1992, making it the oldest lift currently operating at Bristol. The lift services 1,200 passengers per hour up 400 feet of vertical rise.

=== Lunar Launch Magic Carpet ===
A conveyor-lift installed in 2008 that services the Launching Pad located at the base of the mountain for beginners and learn-to-ski students. The lift carries 1,500 passengers per hour up the 60-foot vertical rise to the top of the Launching Pad.

== Trails ==
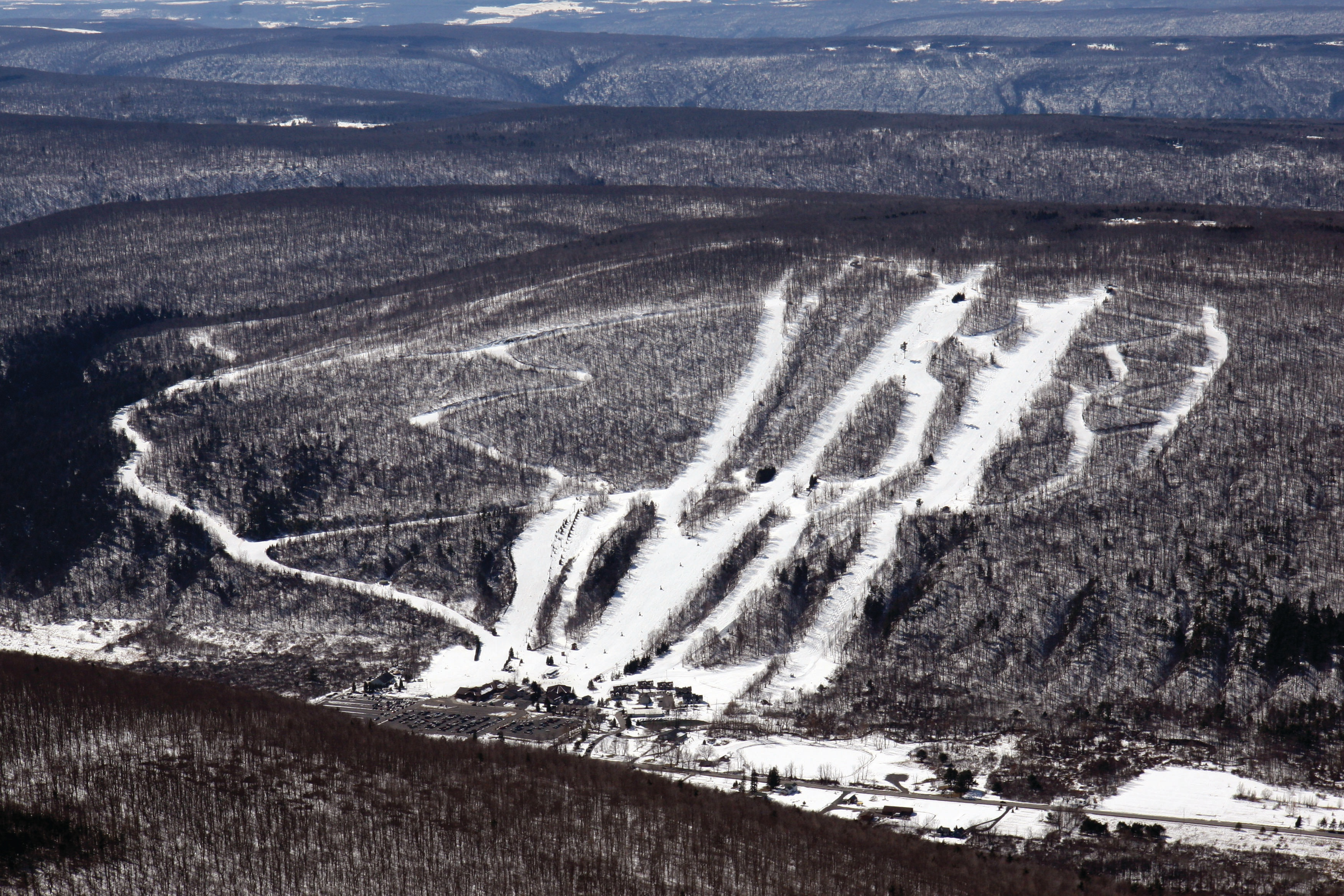
Aerial view of Bristol Mountain in 2008 before Lower North Star and Galaxy Express lift.

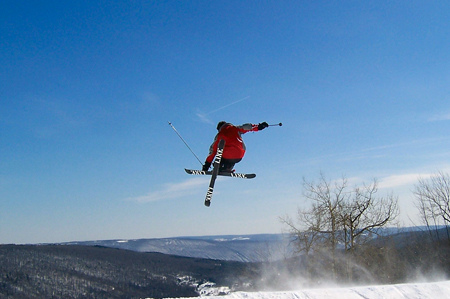
A skier jumping in the terrain park

Bristol Mountain Ski Resort has 35 slopes and trails, and terrain parks including a progressive terrain park (Shooting Star) and the Morning Star Terrain Park has been relocated to Galaxy trail. New for the 2014–15 season is Family Cross on Orion's Belt and various Rail Gardens on Galaxy and the midpoint between Rocket and Meteor. New for the 2015–16 season is the addition of Lower Universe trail on the North side of the mountain. The longest trail/run is about two miles and is made up of three trails, starting at Milky Way, then to Eclipse, and Infinity. All three are easy trails; this goes around the backside of the mountain.

The trail names all have to do with space. This is due to the fact that Bristol Mountain first opened in the 1960s, during the space race, and is located a few miles from the CEK Mees Observatory. Additionally, Challenger is a memorial trail dedicated to the 1986 Space Shuttle Challenger Disaster.

== Cross-country skiing ==
Bristol also has cross country skiing available at the Summit Nordic Center, consisting of two trails, one of which has snowmaking and lights for night skiing. The Summit Nordic Center is not directly accessible from Bristol Mountain's downhill base lodges; visitors must use the separate entrance by driving up the mountain to South Hill Road off of County Road 32.

== Deaths ==
On February 16, 2010, a Penfield man died in a snowboarding accident at Bristol Mountain. Forty-eight-year-old Elliott A. Eklund was pronounced dead at Thompson Hospital in Canandaigua at 8:20 after striking a tree on Bristol Mountain's Shooting Star run at about 7:30.

In 2001, a 36-year-old Palmyra man died after skiing into a tree.

On February 16, 1988, 17-year-old David Elliot of Penfield died after being injured in a skiing accident at Bristol Mountain.

== See also ==
- Ski country
