= Centerfield =

Centerfield may refer to:

== Places in the United States ==
- Centerfield, Kentucky
- Centerfield, New York
- Centerfield, Utah

== Other uses ==
- Centerfield (album), by John Fogerty
  - "Centerfield" (song), by John Fogerty
- Center fielder, outfield position in baseball and softball
