= New York State Route 444 =

State highway in Ontario County, New York, US

New York State Route 444
- Map of the Rochester area with NY 444 highlighted in red

Route information
- Maintained by NYSDOT and the village of Victor
- Length: 6.84 mi (11.01 km)
- Existed: June 2, 1997–present

Major junctions
- South end: US 20 / NY 5 / NY 64 near Bloomfield
- North end: NY 96 in Victor

Location
- Country: United States
- State: New York
- Counties: Ontario

Highway system
- New York Highways; Interstate; US; State; Reference; Parkways
← NY 443	→ NY 446
← NY 20B	NY 20C	→ NY 20D

New York State Route 444 (NY 444) is a north–south state highway located in Ontario County, New York, in the United States. It serves as a connector between the overlapping routes of U.S. Route 20 (US 20), NY 5, and NY 64 south of the Village of Bloomfield and NY 96 in the Village of Victor. NY 444 is a two-lane highway that passes through mostly rural areas of the county, with the exception of the immediate areas around Bloomfield and Victor. The highway passes the Ganondagan State Historic Site south of Victor.

The portion of NY 444 south of Main Street in Bloomfield was originally designated as part of legislative Route 14 by the New York State Legislature in 1908. This unsigned highway, which extended from Corning to Rochester, also included the portion of Main Street in Bloomfield between modern NY 64 and NY 444. Route 14 was realigned to bypass the then-village of Holcomb to the south and west in 1921. The segment of pre-1921 Route 14 from NY 64 to US 20 was designated as New York State Route 20C c. 1931. NY 20C was truncated on its western end to the junction of Main Street and Maple Avenue in 1990. The roads extending north from NY 20C's northern terminus to Victor—namely Elm Street and County Route 3 (CR 3)—were acquired by the state of New York on September 1, 1996, and these roads were combined with NY 20C on June 2, 1997, to create NY 444.

== Route description ==
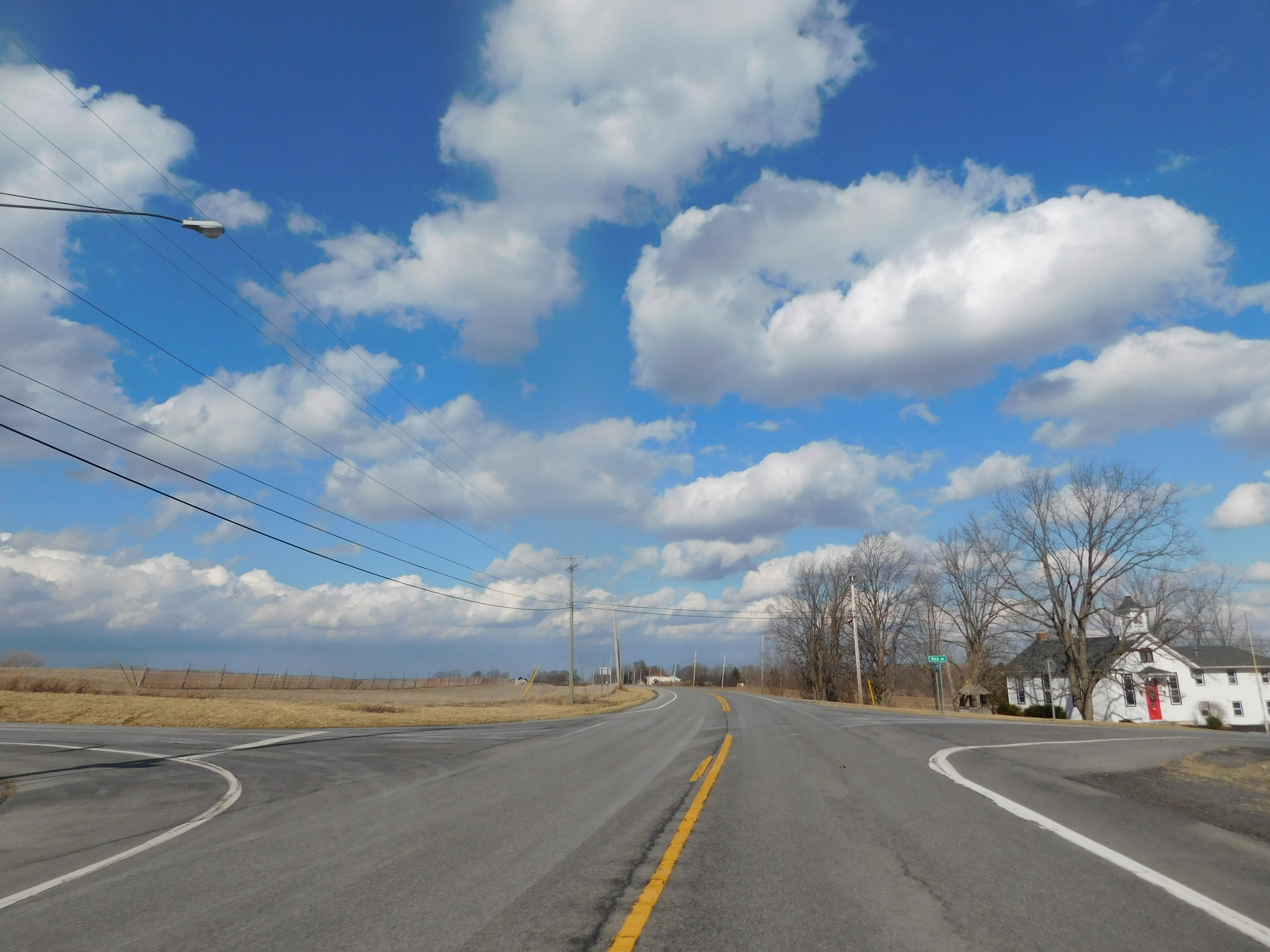
NY 444 at Rice Road in East Bloomfield

NY 444 begins at an intersection with the overlapped routes of US 20, NY 5, and NY 64 in the Ontario County town of East Bloomfield. It heads north as a two-lane highway into the eastern portion of the village of Bloomfield, where it becomes known as Maple Avenue. At the former "Four Corners" of Holcomb—its intersection with Main Street—NY 444 changes names to Elm Street, a moniker it retains until it exits the village.

Back in the town of East Bloomfield, NY 444 becomes Victor–Bloomfield Road and follows a gently curving alignment through a rural, hilly portion of Ontario County. It crosses into the town of Victor at an intersection with Cherry Street. North of this point, NY 444 takes on a linear north–south alignment as it heads toward the village of Victor. At the hamlet of Boughton Hill, NY 444 passes the Ganondagan State Historic Site. From here, NY 444 descends into a valley that is home to the village of Victor. Inside the village, the route becomes Maple Avenue and crosses the Ontario Central Railroad by way of a grade crossing before ending at a junction with NY 96 in the center of the village.

== History ==
In 1908, the New York State Legislature created Route 14, an unsigned legislative route extending from the city of Corning in the Southern Tier to the city of Rochester near Lake Ontario. In the vicinity of the Ontario County villages of East Bloomfield and Holcomb, Route 14 was routed on modern US 20, Maple Avenue, Main Street, and NY 64. On March 1, 1921, Route 14 was realigned to bypass Holcomb to the south and west on what is now US 20, NY 5, and NY 64.

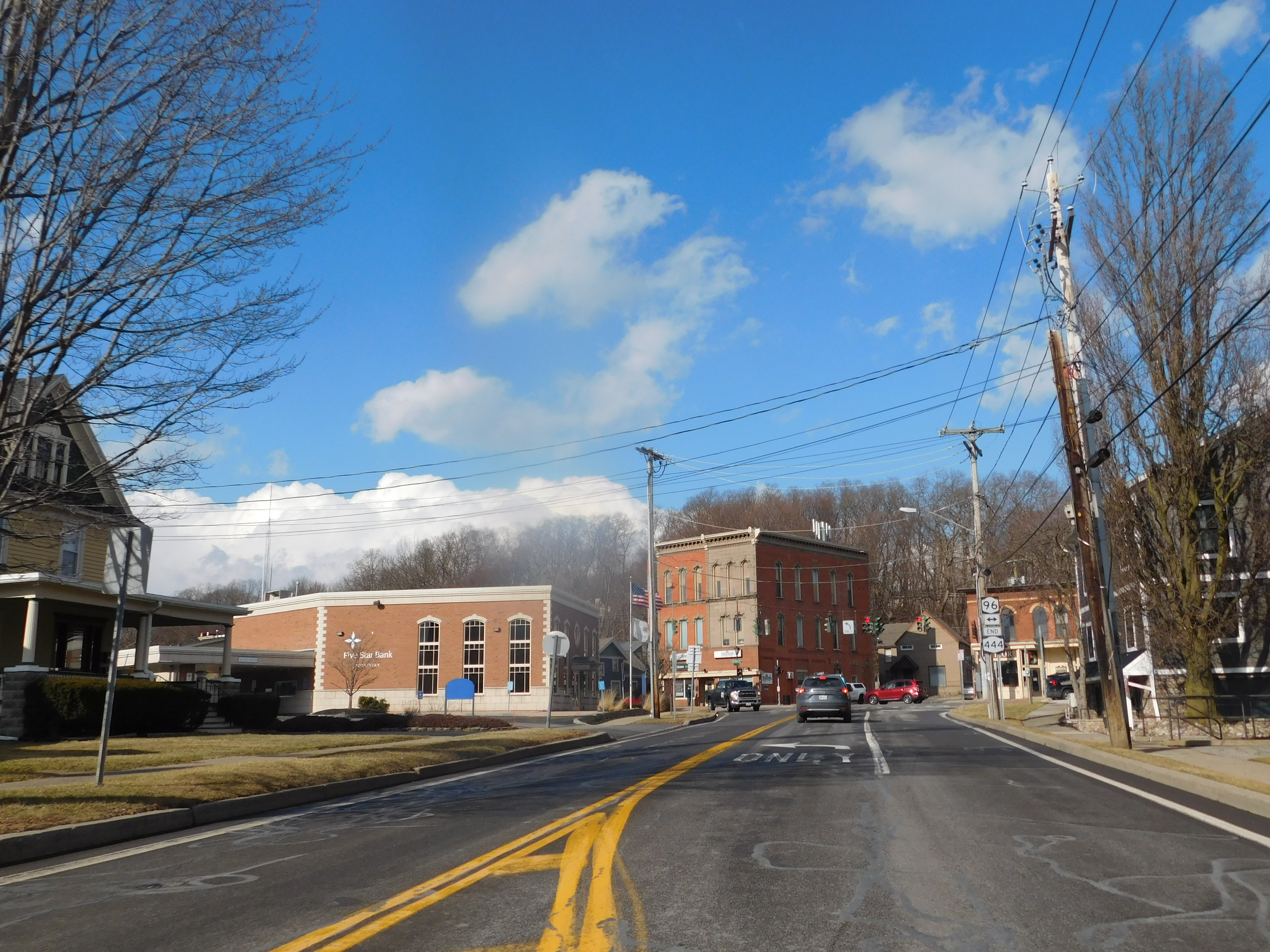
Northern terminus of NY 444 at NY 96 in Victor

The segment of former Route 14 between the intersection of US 20 and Maple Avenue south of Holcomb and the junction of NY 64 and Main Street west of East Bloomfield was designated as NY 20C, a loop route of US 20, c. 1931. In 1990, the villages of East Bloomfield and Holcomb were consolidated to create the village of Bloomfield. That same year, NY 20C was truncated to consist only of the portion of the route between the former "Four Corners" of Holcomb—the intersection of Main Street and Maple Avenue—and US 20. The former portion of NY 20C on Main Street is now maintained by the town of East Bloomfield and the village of Bloomfield; however, it is still defined in New York State Highway Law as a state highway.

On September 1, 1996, the state of New York assumed ownership and maintenance of Elm Street in Bloomfield and CR 3, the continuation of Elm Street north of the Bloomfield village line to the Victor village line, as part of a county-wide highway maintenance swap. Elm Street had previously been maintained by the village of Bloomfield while CR 3 was maintained by Ontario County. The newly acquired roadway between Bloomfield and Victor and the remaining piece of NY 20C were redesignated as NY 444 on June 2, 1997. The portion of NY 444 within the village of Victor is locally maintained.

== Major intersections ==
The entire route is in Ontario County.

Location	mi	km	Destinations	Notes
East Bloomfield	0.00	0.00	US 20 / NY 5 / NY 64 (Buffalo Road) – Canandaigua, Avon	Southern terminus
Bloomfield	1.20	1.93	Main Street	Formerly part of NY 20C
Village of Victor	6.84	11.01	NY 96 (Main Street)	Northern terminus
1.000 mi = 1.609 km; 1.000 km = 0.621 mi

== See also ==
- List of county routes in Ontario County, New York
