= East Bloomfield Historic District =

Historic district in New York, United States

- U.S. National Register of Historic Places
- U.S. Historic district
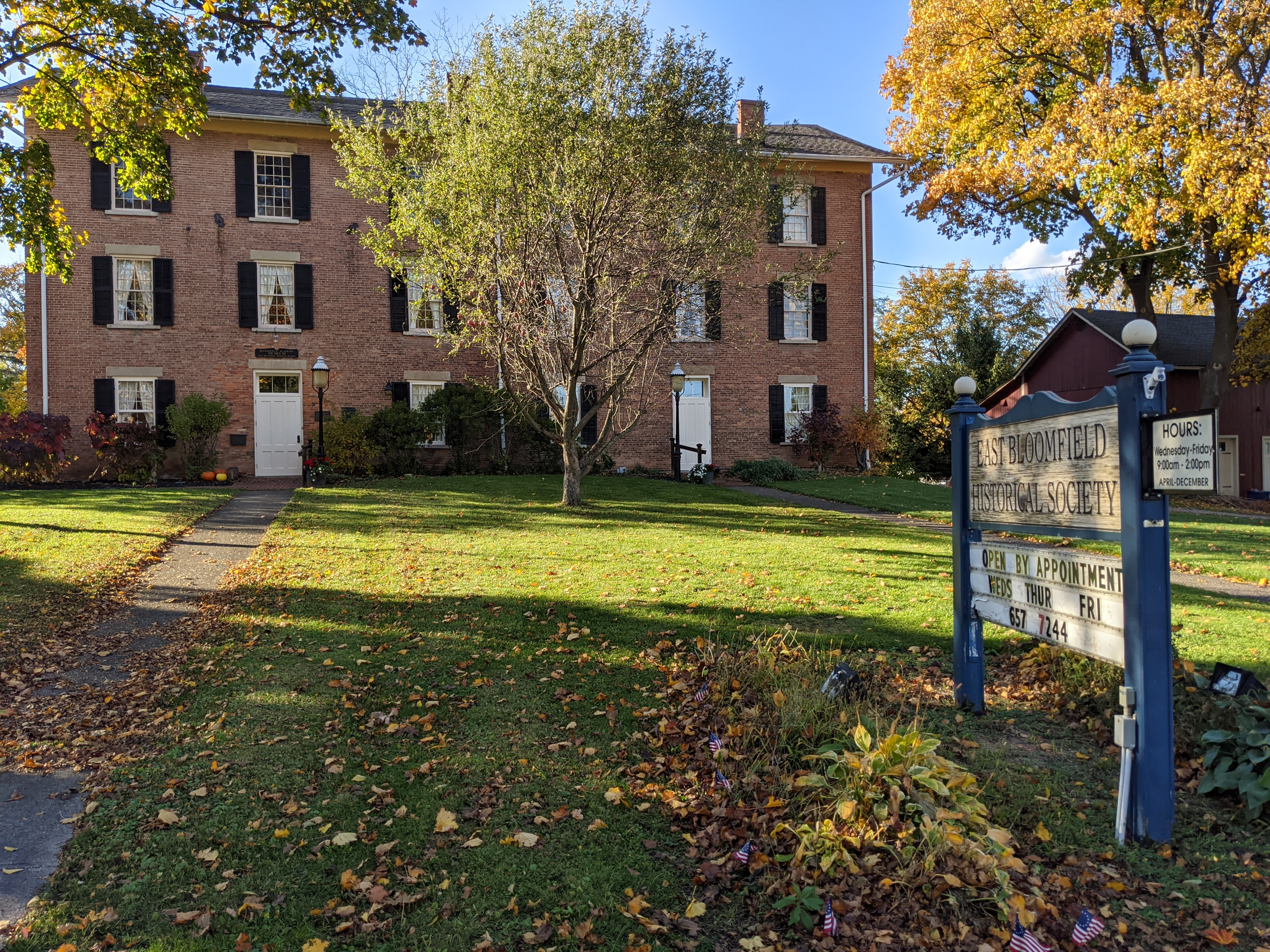
- East Bloomfield Historical Society

- Location within New York Location within the United States
- Location: Roughly Main, South, Park Sts. and NY 5, East Bloomfield, New York
- Coordinates: 42°53′43″N 77°26′4″W
- Area: 46 acres (19 ha)
- Architectural style: Mid 19th Century Revival, Late Victorian, Federal
- NRHP reference No.: 89001947
- Added to NRHP: November 13, 1989

East Bloomfield Historic District is a national historic district located at East Bloomfield in Ontario County, New York. The district encompasses 49 properties with 90 contributing resources including residential, commercial, religious, and civic properties in the historic core of East Bloomfield. The structures are centered on the village green.

It was listed on the National Register of Historic Places in 1989.
