= Skenoh Island =

Island in Canandaigua Lake

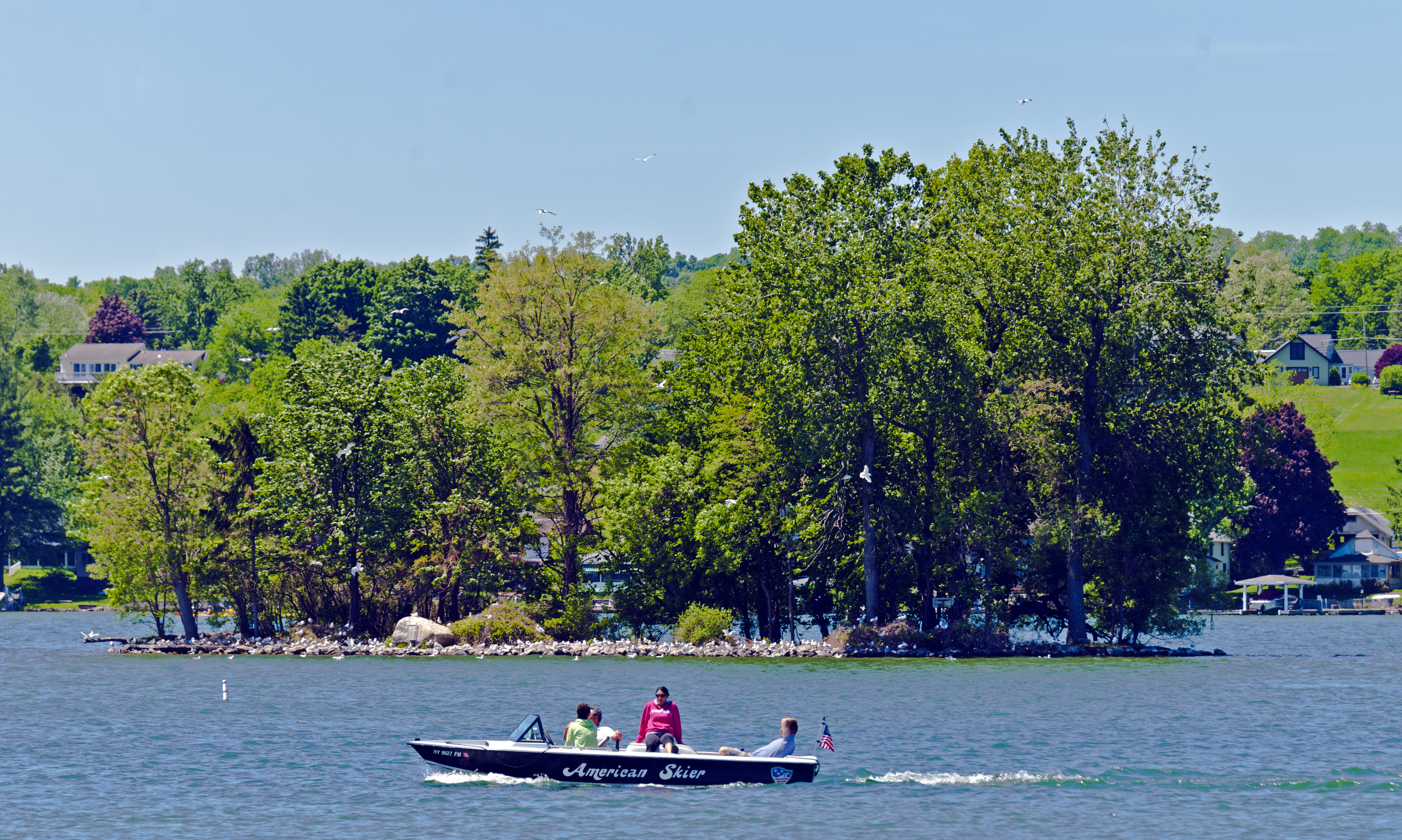
- Skenoh Island from Canandaigua City Pier

- Location within New York
- Etymology: "Skenoh" translates to "health" or "peace" in the Seneca language. Until 2021 the island was known as "Squaw Island".

Geography
- Coordinates: 42°52′12″N 77°16′32″W
- Adjacent to: Canandaigua Lake
- Area: 8,000 sq ft (740 m^{2})
- Length: 145 ft (44.2 m)
- Width: 55 ft (16.8 m)

Administration
- United States
- State: New York
- County: Ontario
- Town: Canandaigua

Skenoh Island is located at the north end of Canandaigua Lake, near the city of Canandaigua, New York, United States. It is one of two islands in the 11 Finger Lakes. (Note: The other is Frontenac Island, in Cayuga Lake near the town of Union Springs.) Frequently it is described as New York's smallest state park; however, while it is one of the state's smallest protected areas, it is not formally designated as a state park, but rather it is a "unique area" managed by the New York State Department of Environmental Conservation. The island was previously known as Squaw Island until October 2021, when the name was changed to remove the ethnic slur squaw.

It formed from the alluvial deposits of nearby Sucker Brook. Limestone from the brook's bedrock dissolved in its waters forms rare lime carbonate oncolites, known locally as "water biscuits", on its shores. Rises in the lake level following the damming of Canandaigua Outlet have reduced the island to a small portion of its former land. The state and local activists have worked together to shore it up against erosion and prevent it from disappearing.

== Geography ==
The island is located roughly 500 feet (150 m) south of the mouth of Sucker Brook and 600 feet (180 m) southwest of the end of the docks at the north end of the lake in Canandaigua. Although both those locations are in the city, the island itself is outside its boundaries, in the town of Canandaigua. The surrounding waters, like much of the shallow north end of the lake, are no deeper than 25 feet (7.6 m) it is sometimes possible to wade to it from shore.

It is roughly 145 feet (44 m) long by 55 feet (17 m) wide, for a total area just under 8,000 square feet (740 m^{2}). Several mature deciduous trees grow on the island; the shoreline is marked by large piles of flat stones. Its terrain is level, barely rising above the water level. A 10-short-ton (9.1 t) granite boulder is located in the middle.

== History ==
Canandaigua Lake, like all the Finger Lakes, was formed at the end of the last Ice Age about 11,000 years ago, from the glacial meltwater flooding the deep glacial moraines that typify the terrain of western Central New York. Skenoh Island began to form as a sandbar created by the interactions between the sediments carried in Sucker Brook and the counterclockwise currents along the lakeshore. Prior to European settlement, the island had two long gravel spits projecting to the north and southwest; the adjoining delta of the brook would have made the island easy to reach from land without boating to it, especially at times of year when the water was low.

The first humans known to have settled in the region, the ancestors of the Iroquois Native American tribes, did not live on the island, even though it was larger than it is now. However, flint arrowheads and other artifacts found on the island suggest it was used for hunting waterfowl and perhaps deer. It may also have been used as a staging area for Iroquois warriors in the area mobilizing against the Sullivan Expedition of 1779, during the Revolutionary War.

While it is widely believed that the island got its original name of "Squaw Island" from its purported use as a place of refuge for Iroquois women during that time, the island's easy accessibility from the shore (even today) makes that use unlikely, and thus casts doubt on that story as the origin of the name. It seems more likely that it emerged from the island's use as a hunting and fishing spot.

In 1900, paleontologist John M. Clarke published a paper about the rare oncolites that had long accumulated on the island's north shore. The disc-shaped white rocks, known locally as "water biscuits", were light yet strong when wet but brittle enough to break by hand when dry. They were formed, Clarke wrote, when lime that had dissolved in the water from the limestone bedrock that Sucker Brook flowed over precipitated after algae that had grown on pebble or gravel substrates used up enough of the free carbon dioxide in the water, a process that repeated itself enough times to form the biscuits. He called it "a most interesting instance of the influence of plant growth upon lime deposits" and compared to similar phenomena recorded in European lakes that help explain the formation of similar structures found in fossil records elsewhere.

Clarke's paper attracted the interest of Mary Clark Thompson, a Canandaigua native and daughter of former governor Myron H. Clark. After the 1899 death of her husband, New York City banker Frederick Ferris Thompson, she had returned to Sonnenberg Gardens, her estate in Canandaigua, and used the fortune she had inherited from him to finance civic improvements. She used her influence and connections to have the island, which had been state property since the 1794 Treaty of Canandaigua, declared a New York State Museum Reservation in 1918 in order to protect it. (Note: At the time New York had almost no state parks and no state-level parks agency, nor any system for classifying and managing protected areas.) The following year she had the large granite boulder moved to the center of the island, with an explanatory plaque affixed to it.

Throughout the rest of the 20th century, Skenoh Island would face threats greater than those that could be held at bay by making it a protected area. Damming of Canandaigua Outlet drove up the lake's water level, leaving most of the two spits permanently underwater. The delta was dredged out of existence in the late 1950s to allow better lake access from a marina to the west. In 1975 it was made part of the state's newly created Natural and Historic Preservation Trust.

Two years later the state's Department of Environmental Conservation (DEC), which by then managed the land, tried to sell it to the Town of Canandaigua, within whose boundaries the island sat, for $1. In the mid-1980s the state's Office of Parks, Recreation and Historic Preservation dredged Sucker Brook all the way to the Parrish Street bridge in the city of Canandaigua in order to expand facilities for a state marine park and boat launch. DEC sank cedar logs around the island and took other measures to protect its shores from erosion.

The DEC currently designates the property as Skenoh Island Unique Area. Further protection efforts have been undertaken by a group of local citizen activists.

As with other places with "squaw" in the name, efforts began in the 21st century to have the name changed, since the use of the term is seen as insensitive. These efforts became successful with the announcement in October 2021 that the U.S. Board on Geographic Names had approved the name "Skenoh Island", effective immediately, based on recommendations from the New York State Geographic Names Committee, the New York State Museum and the Commissioner of the New York State Department of Environmental Conservation. The word "skenoh" translates to "health" or "peace" in the Seneca language.

== See also ==
- List of islands in New York
