= South Bristol Grange Hall 1107 =

- U.S. National Register of Historic Places
- Location within New York Location within the United States
- Location: 6457 NY 64, Bristol Springs, New York
- Coordinates: 42°42′28″N 77°22′50″W
- Area: less than one acre
- Built: 1923
- Architectural style: Late 19th and Early 20th Century American Movements, vernacular
- NRHP reference No.: 97001528
- Added to NRHP: December 19, 1997

South Bristol Grange Hall 1107 is a historic Grange hall located at Bristol Springs in Ontario County, New York. It is a large 2 1/2-story, gable-roofed, vernacular frame building built in 1923.

It was listed on the National Register of Historic Places in 1997.
