= Canandaigua Lake State Marine Park =

State park in Ontario County, New York

- Location within New York
- Interactive map of Canandaigua Lake State Marine Park
- Type: State park
- Location: 620 South Main Street; Canandaigua, New York
- Nearest city: Canandaigua, New York
- Coordinates: 42.877°N 77.276°W
- Operator: New York State Office of Parks, Recreation and Historic Preservation
- Visitors: 53,976 (in 2020)
- Open: May through October
- Website: Canandaigua Lake State Marine Park

Canandaigua Lake State Marine Park is a New York state park and boat launch located on the north shore of Canandaigua Lake in Ontario County, New York.

The park is 1 of 80 New York State Parks that are in the path of totality for the 2024 solar eclipse, with the park experiencing 2 minutes and 51 seconds of totality.

== Facilities ==
The park offers three concrete boat ramps, with room for six boats to launch or be removed from the water simultaneously. A short canal allows boat access to Canandaigua Lake. Parking is available for up to 110 cars and trailers.

Between September 2011 and May 2012, the park was closed to allow for the complete reconstruction of the boat launch area.

Although the park's primary purpose is to serve as a boat launch facility, fishing from shore is also permitted at the park. A small picnic area near a duck pond is also available.

== See also ==
- List of New York state parks
