= Roseland Waterpark =

Waterpark in New York, United States

Coordinates: 42.881884°N 77.259710°W

Roseland Waterpark is a (56 acres (230,000 m^{2})) water park in the Finger Lakes region of Upstate New York. Bristol Mountain owns the waterpark.

It is located at 250 Eastern Boulevard in Canandaigua, New York.
