= Burning Springs =

In general, "burning spring(s)" refers to any water-fed spring that percolates natural gas that may be set afire.

Burning Springs may refer to:

== United States ==
- Burning Springs, Kentucky
- Burning Springs, West Virginia
- Springs in the town of Bristol, New York visited by explorers Robert de La Salle and René de Bréhant de Galinée in 1669

== Azerbaijan ==
- The Yanar Bulaq (burning springs) on Yanar Dag (Fire Mountain)
