= George and Addison Wheeler House =

Historic house in New York, United States

- U.S. National Register of Historic Places
- Location within New York Location within the United States
- Location: 6353 and 6342 Grimble Rd., East Bloomfield, New York
- Coordinates: 42°51′33″N 77°22′22″W
- Area: 110 acres (45 ha)
- Built: 1818
- Architectural style: Greek Revival
- NRHP reference No.: 05000168 (original); 100005957 (increase)

Significant dates
- Added to NRHP: March 15, 2005
- Boundary increase: December 28, 2020

George and Addison Wheeler House, also known as Old Place, is a historic home located at East Bloomfield in Ontario County, New York. The Greek Revival–style home was built in two sections in about 1818 and 1840. The 2-story main block from 1840 features a temple front with a massive, pedimented portico. Behind it stands a 1 1/2-story wing that was the original saltbox-style home constructed about 1818. Also on the property is a 19th-century barn / carriage house and a small family cemetery. Abandoned for a generation, it was restored in the late 1940s by William and Marie Houghton.

It was listed on the National Register of Historic Places in 2005.
