= Centerfield, New York =

Hamlet in New York, United States

Coordinates: 42°52′53″N 77°21′32″W

Centerfield is a hamlet in Ontario County, New York, United States, located in the Town of Canandaigua. It is between the City of Canandaigua and the Town of Bloomfield.

The community is located on conjoined US Route 20 and New York State Route 5 (known locally as Routes 5 and 20) west of the City of Canandaigua.
