= Holcomb, New York =

Former village in New York, United States of America

Coordinates: 42°54′08″N 77°25′11″W

Holcomb was a village located on New York State Route 20C (now New York State Route 444) in the town of East Bloomfield in Ontario County, New York. It was incorporated in 1917. In 1990, the village merged with the neighboring village of East Bloomfield to create a single village named Bloomfield. Many local businesses still reference the Holcomb name, such as the "East Bloomfield-Holcomb Volunteer Fire Department" and the "Holcomb Snooker House and Rodeo Bar."
