= Victor (village), New York =

Victor, New York
- Village
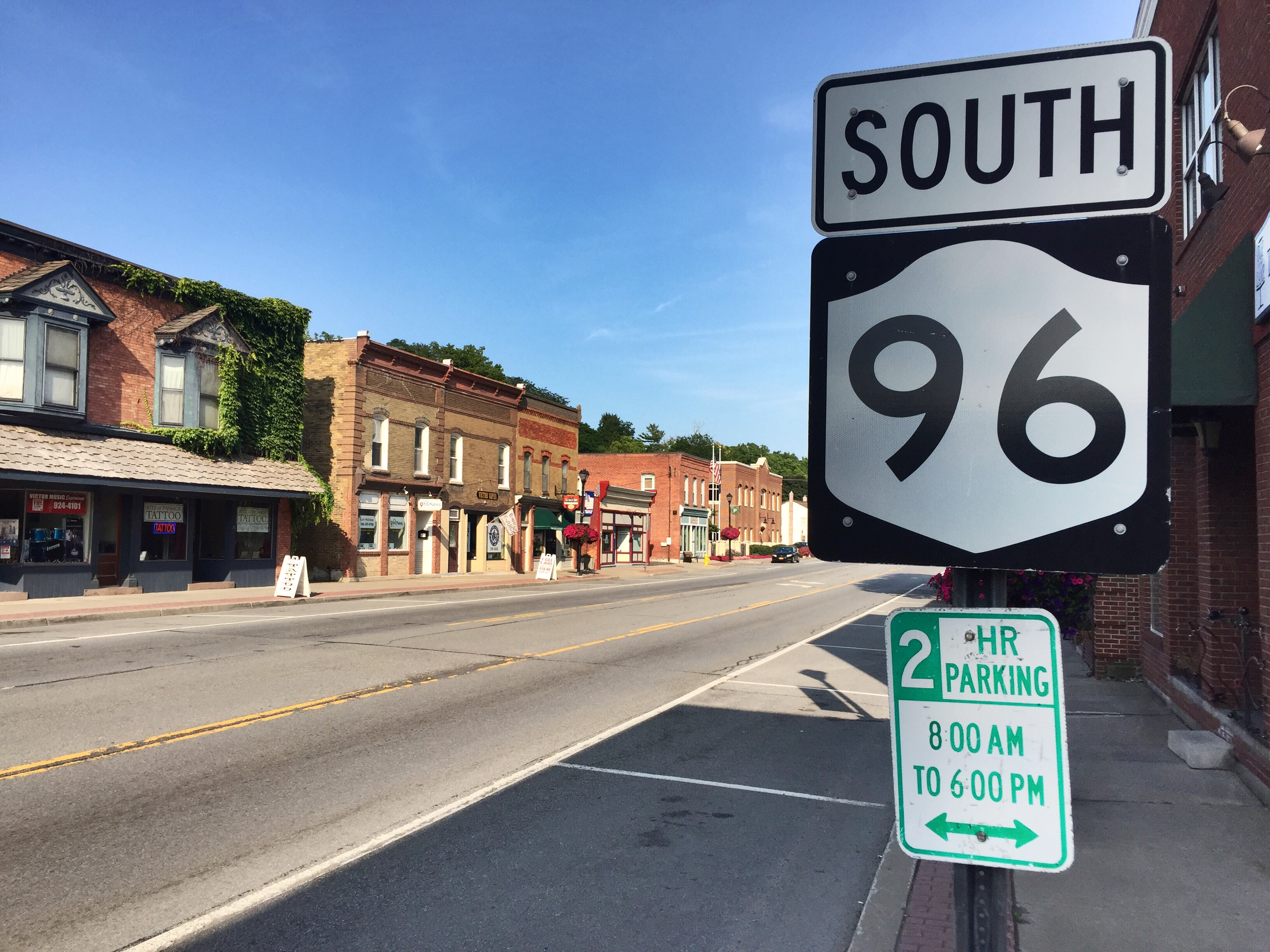
- Main Street

- Location within the state of New York
- Coordinates: 42°58′59″N 77°24′21″W
- Country: United States
- State: New York
- County: Ontario

Area
  - Total: 1.37 sq mi (3.54 km^{2})
  - Land: 1.37 sq mi (3.54 km^{2})
  - Water: 0 sq mi (0.00 km^{2})
- Elevation: 577 ft (176 m)

Population (2020)
  - Total: 2,744
  - Density: 2,008.1/sq mi (775.34/km^{2})
- Time zone: UTC-5 (Eastern (EST))
  - Summer (DST): UTC-4 (EDT)
- ZIP code: 14564
- Area code: 585
- FIPS code: 36-77376
- GNIS feature ID: 0970742
- Website: https://townofvictorny.gov/village

Victor is a village located within the Town of Victor in Ontario County, New York, United States. The population was 2,744 at the 2020 census.

Victor is in the southeast part of the town and is southeast of Rochester.

== History ==
The region was part of the heartland of the Seneca tribe, but they were driven out by the French in 1687. The village succeeded Boughton Hill as the major community in the town after long years of rivalry with East Victor (then called "Scudderville"). The village was incorporated in 1879.

== Geography ==
According to the United States Census Bureau, the village has a total area of 1.4 square miles (3.6 km^{2}), all land.

New York State Route 96 passes through the village, which is south of the New York State Thruway (Interstate 90). The northern terminus of New York State Route 444 is in Victor.

== Demographics ==
Historical population
Census	Pop.	Note	%±
1870	506		—
1880	704		39.1%
1890	778		10.5%
1900	649		−16.6%
1910	881		35.7%
1920	945		7.3%
1930	1,042		10.3%
1940	1,111		6.6%
1950	1,066		−4.1%
1960	1,180		10.7%
1970	2,187		85.3%
1980	2,370		8.4%
1990	2,308		−2.6%
2000	2,433		5.4%
2010	2,696		10.8%
2020	2,744		1.8%
U.S. Decennial Census

At the 2000 census, there were 2,433 people, 935 households, and 665 families in the village. The population density was 1,763.4 inhabitants per square mile (680.9/km^{2}). There were 972 housing units at an average density of 272.0 persons/km^{2} (704.5 persons/sq mi). The racial makeup of the village was 97.33% White, 0.45% African American, 0.21% Native American, 0.90% Asian, 0.45% from other races, and 0.66% from two or more races. 1.27% of the population were Hispanic or Latino of any race.

Of the 935 households 35.4% had children under the age of 18 living with them, 59.8% were married couples living together, 7.9% have a woman whose husband does not live with her, and 28.8% were non-families. 21.7% of households were one person and 5.8% were one person aged 65 or older. The average household size was 2.59 and the average family size was 3.08.

The age distribution was 26.9% under the age of 18, 6.4% from 18 to 24, 32.2% from 25 to 44, 24.4% from 45 to 64, and 10.0% 65 or older. The median age was 37 years. For every 100 females, there were 99.9 males. For every 100 females age 18 and over, there were 96.7 males.

The median household income was $54,821 and the median family income was $62,798. Males had a median income of $45,332 versus $30,045 for females. The per capita income for the village was $24,776. 2.4% of the population and 1.3% of families were below the poverty line. Out of the total people living in poverty, 1.4% are under the age of 18 and 4.4% are 65 or older.

== Notable people ==
- Brann Dailor, drummer for metal band Mastodon
- Bill Kelliher, guitarist for Mastodon
- Porter Sheldon, former US Congressman
- Seth Payne, NFL football player
