= CTEC =

Microsoft training program

The Microsoft Certified Technical Education Centre (Microsoft CTEC) channel provides training for computer professions in the use of Microsoft products. The term Microsoft Certified Technical Education Centre was introduced by Microsoft in early 1990s. Microsoft CTECs are authorised to deliver Microsoft Official Curriculum courses to computer professionals using Microsoft Certified Trainers (MCTs). Through Microsoft CTECs, Microsoft Certified Solution Providers learn about Microsoft BackOffice, Internet and developer tools technology.

Currently the program involves more than 900 training centers in North America with more than 1,900 Microsoft CTECs internationally. Microsoft Official Curriculum courses are taught by Microsoft Certified Trainers (MCTs), professionals certified by Microsoft for a particular product or technology.

Microsoft CTEC with the new program, Certified Partners for Learning Solutions.
