= Bristol, New York =

- Town
- Location within the state of New York
- Coordinates: 42°49′11″N 77°25′28″W
- Country: United States
- State: New York
- County: Ontario

Government
  - Type: Town Council
  - Town Supervisor: Fred Stresing (D)
  - Town Council: Members' List: • Patti Giordano (D); • Lauren Bolanda (D); • Chris Hart (R); • Fred Stresing (D); • Steve Pappano (R)

Area
  - Total: 36.71 sq mi (95.08 km^{2})
  - Land: 36.70 sq mi (95.04 km^{2})
  - Water: 0.015 sq mi (0.04 km^{2})
- Elevation: 1,234 ft (376 m)

Population (2020)
  - Total: 2,298 ▼
  - Estimate (2021): 2,286
  - Density: 62.2/sq mi (24.01/km^{2})
- Time zone: UTC-5 (Eastern (EST))
  - Summer (DST): UTC-4 (EDT)
- FIPS code: 36-08378
- GNIS feature ID: 0978754
- Website: www.townofbristol.org

Bristol is a town in Ontario County, New York, United States. The population was 2,298 at the 2020 census. Bristol was named after Bristol County, Massachusetts, by settlers from New England. The town of Bristol is in the western half of the county, southwest of the city of Canandaigua.

== History ==
The region was visited by the explorers Robert de La Salle and René de Bréhant de Galinée in 1669 in order to observe a burning spring known to the area's indigenous members of the Seneca tribe. Such "burning springs" occur in places where the water appears to support a flame caused by escaping natural gas.

The Sullivan Expedition destroyed native villages as it passed through Bristol in 1779. Some of the soldiers were impressed with the area and later returned to buy land.

The town area was first settled around 1788. The town of Bristol was formed in 1789, but the first town meeting was not held until 1797. In 1838 part of the town was used to form the town of South Bristol.

== Geography ==
According to the United States Census Bureau, the town has a total area of 36.8 square miles (95 km^{2}), of which 36.7 square miles (95 km^{2}) is land and 0.04 square miles (0.10 km^{2}) (0.05%) is water.

U.S. Route 20A (US 20A) passes across the town. New York State Route 64 (NY 64) is a north–south highway in the southeastern part of the town.

Mud Creek is an important stream in Bristol.

== Demographics ==
Historical population
Census	Pop.	Note	%±
1820	2,429		—
1830	2,952		21.5%
1840	1,953		−33.8%
1850	1,733		−11.3%
1860	1,657		−4.4%
1870	1,551		−6.4%
1880	1,650		6.4%
1890	1,510		−8.5%
1900	1,310		−13.2%
1910	1,247		−4.8%
1920	896		−28.1%
1930	743		−17.1%
1940	750		0.9%
1950	915		22.0%
1960	1,002		9.5%
1970	1,307		30.4%
1980	1,802		37.9%
1990	2,071		14.9%
2000	2,421		16.9%
2010	2,315		−4.4%
2020	2,298		−0.7%
2021 (est.)	2,286		−0.5%
U.S. Decennial Census

As of the census of 2000, there were 2,421 people, 895 households, and 690 families residing in the town. The population density was 65.9 inhabitants per square mile (25.4/km^{2}). There were 989 housing units at an average density of 26.9 per square mile (10.4/km^{2}). The racial makeup of the town was 98.14% White, 0.33% African American, 0.50% Native American, 0.37% Asian, 0.04% Pacific Islander, and 0.62% from two or more races. Hispanic or Latino of any race were 0.50% of the population.

There were 895 households, out of which 39.0% had children under the age of 18 living with them, 67.7% were married couples living together, 6.9% had a female householder with no husband present, and 22.8% were non-families. 17.1% of all households were made up of individuals, and 5.3% had someone living alone who was 65 years of age or older. The average household size was 2.71 and the average family size was 3.05.

In the town, the population was spread out, with 27.4% under the age of 18, 5.2% from 18 to 24, 30.8% from 25 to 44, 28.4% from 45 to 64, and 8.2% who were 65 years of age or older. The median age was 39 years. For every 100 females, there were 106.4 males. For every 100 females age 18 and over, there were 103.9 males.

The median income for a household in the town was $53,250, and the median income for a family was $60,172. Males had a median income of $38,182 versus $27,900 for females. The per capita income for the town was $24,060. About 4.6% of families and 5.5% of the population were below the poverty line, including 6.5% of those under age 18 and 5.2% of those age 65 or over.

== Communities and locations in Bristol ==
- Bristol – The hamlet of Bristol is near the north town line on County Route 2 (CR 2, named Baptist Hill Road). It was formerly called "Baptist Hill."
- Bristol Center – A hamlet in the eastern part of the town on NY 64 at its junction with CR 32. It was first settled around 1793.
- Egypt – Located within Egypt Valley in the area of CR 33's intersection with Egypt Road.
- Fletchers Corners – A location between Gladding Corner and Bristol Center on CR 32.
- Gladding Corner– A hamlet in the south part of the town on CR 32.
- Mayweed Corner– A hamlet on US 20A, south of Bristol village.
- Vincent – A hamlet northeast of Mayweed Corner on US 20A. It was originally called "Muttonville" due to the number of sheep herds.

== Notable people ==
- Emily Parmely Collins (1814–1909), suffragist, activist, writer
- Anna Maxwell (1851 - 1929), founder of the United States Army Nurse Corps
