= Canandaigua Lake =

Lake in New York, United States

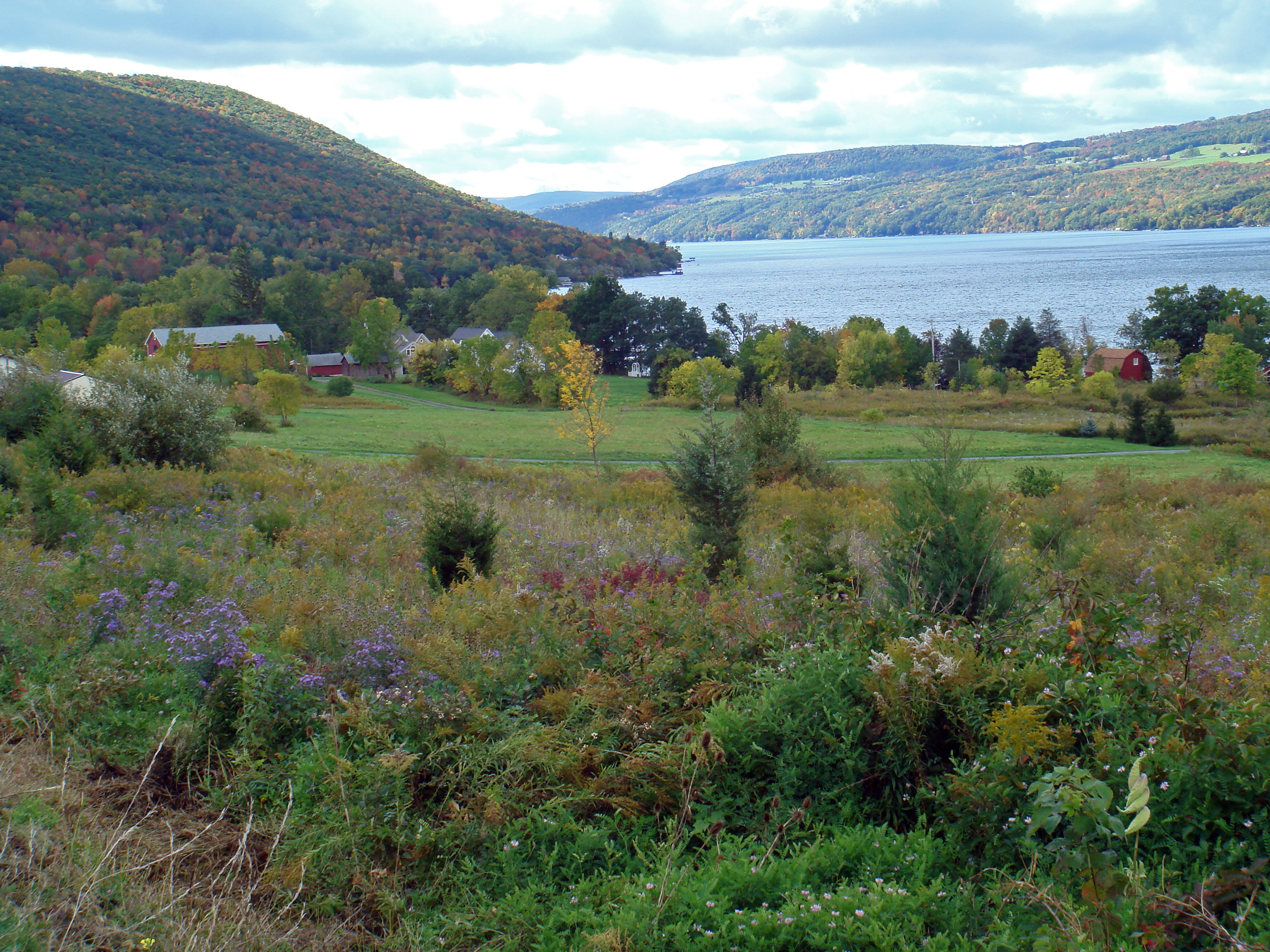

- Location within New York
- Location: Ontario / Yates counties, New York, United States
- Group: Finger Lakes
- Coordinates: 42°45′24″N 77°19′04″W
- Type: Ground Moraine
- Primary inflows: West River
- Primary outflows: Canandaigua Outlet
- Basin countries: United States
- Max. length: 16 mi (26 km)
- Max. width: 1.5 mi (2.4 km)
- Surface area: 10,750 acres (43.5 km^{2})
- Average depth: 127 ft (39 m)
- Max. depth: 276 ft (84 m)
- Water volume: .39 cu mi (1.6 km^{3})
- Shore length^{1}: 36 mi (58 km)
- Surface elevation: 688 ft (210 m)
- Islands: Skenoh Island
- Settlements: Canandaigua, Naples
- ^{1} Shore length is not a well-defined measure.

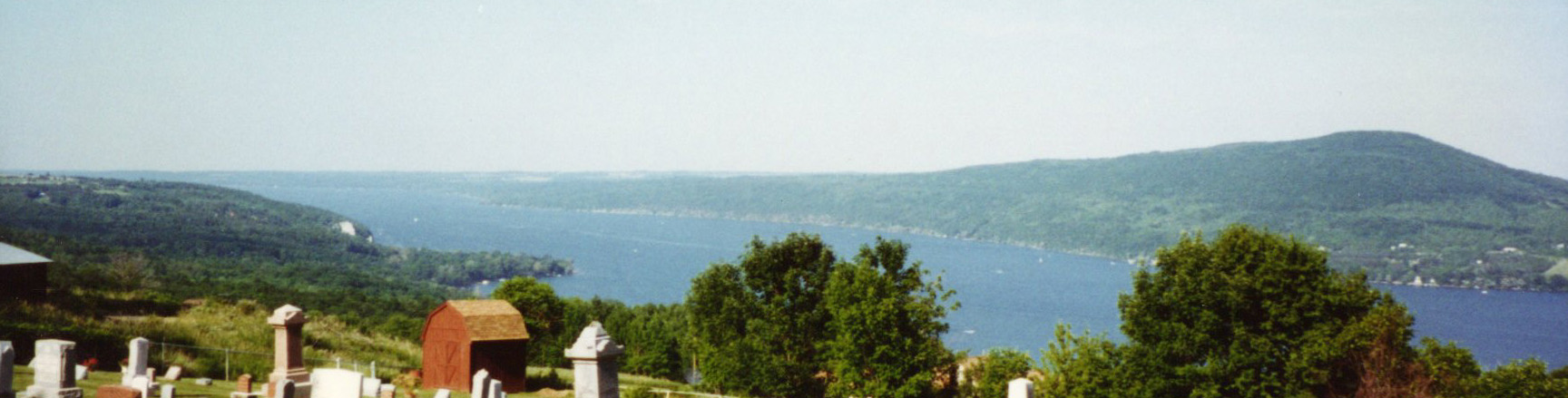
Canandaigua Lake from its western shore (1998)

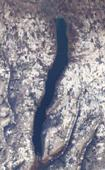
Satellite view of the lake

The eleven Finger Lakes of New York State.

Canandaigua Lake (/ˌkænənˈdeɪɡwə/) is a Finger Lake in Ontario County in western New York. It is the westernmost of the major Finger Lakes, largest of the four Finger Lakes in the county, and fourth largest by size of the Finger Lakes. The City of Canandaigua is located at the northern end of the lake and the village of Naples is several miles south of the southern end.

The name Canandaigua is derived from the Seneca name spelled variously Kanandarque, Ganondagan, Ga-nun-da-gwa, or in a modern transcription, Tganödä:gwëh, which means "the chosen spot", or "at the chosen town".

== Description ==
Canandaigua Lake is 15.5 miles (24.9 km) long, 1.5 miles (2.4 km) wide, and has a shoreline of 35.9 miles (57.8 km). Near the northern end is Skenoh Island. About fifty percent of the surrounding land is in forest, but most of the remainder is under cultivation. Of 35.9 miles (57.8 km) of shoreline, 34.7 miles (55.8 km) (97%) are private and 1.2 miles (1.9 km) (3%) are public.

Canandaigua Lake is known for its water quality. The lake is the sole source of drinking water for the town and city of Canandaigua, located on the northern end of the lake, in addition to serving the communities of Rushville, Newark, Canandaigua, Palmyra, and Gorham township as their main public supplier of water. In April 2013 and 2017, the drinking water was entered into a competition held by the New York section of American Water Works Association, in which it was voted the best drinking water in New York State. The lake's water is well-oxygenated, allowing fish to live in both shallow and deep areas. The water is also very clear, allowing visibility of the bottom up to 30 to 50 feet (9.1 to 15.2 m) below the surface.

=== Skenoh Island ===
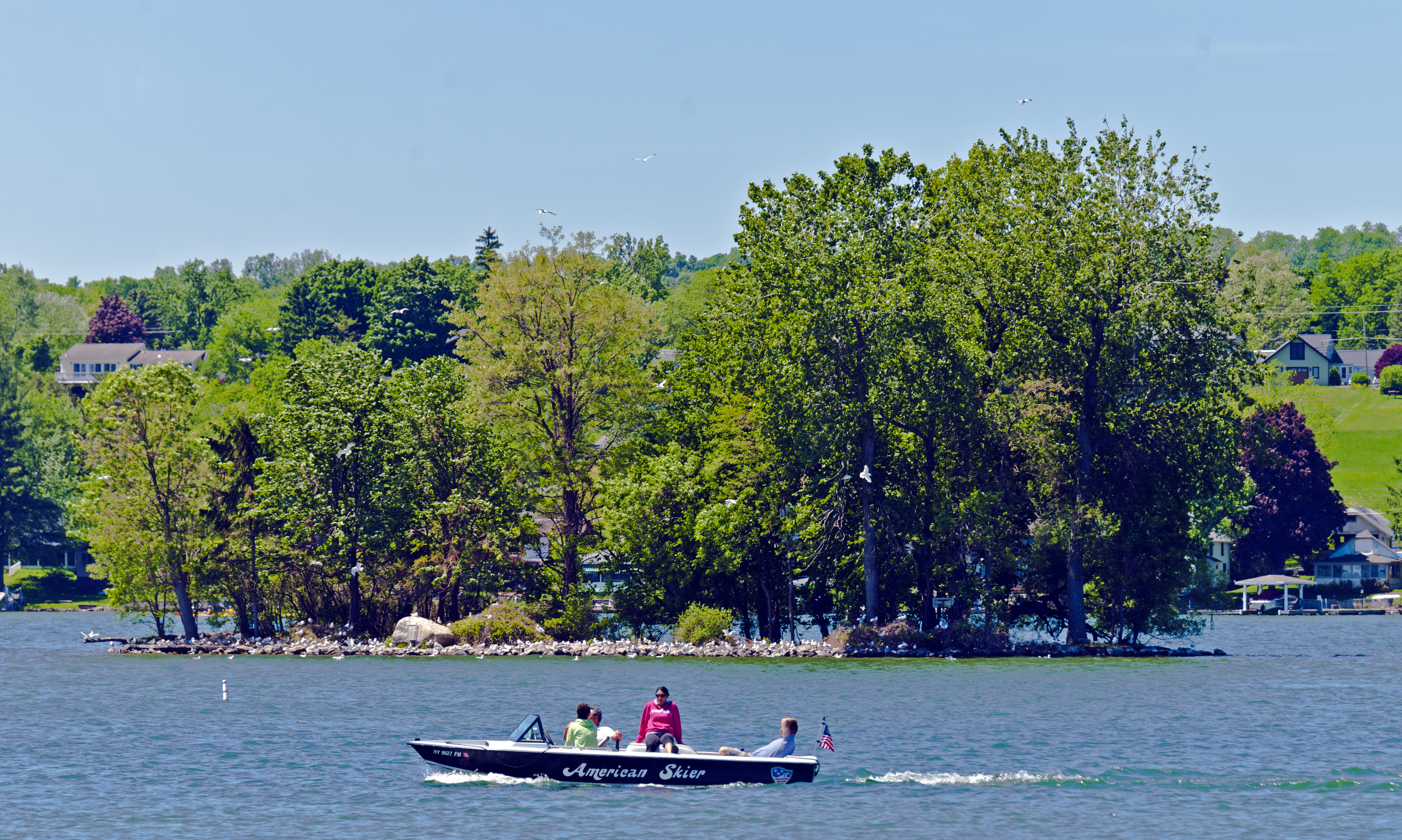
Skenoh Island from Canandaigua city pier

Skenoh Island, formerly known as Squaw Island, is located at the north end of the lake. It is the smallest Fish and Wildlife Management Area in New York State and one of only two islands in the Finger Lakes. The Seneca recall that the island was used to hide the Seneca women and children during the Sullivan Expedition against the Six Nations of the Iroquois in 1779. The island exhibits an extremely rare form of carbonate of lime forms deposits on pebbles (conglomerate). It is a feathery light rock which is calcified from algae filtered by sand and pond scum. The rock, locally called "water biscuits", is hard in the water but crumbles if allowed to dry out. In recent years the island has been eroding rapidly from the forces of ice, wind, water currents and development changing the wave patterns.

In 1977, New York State Department of Environmental Conservation installed a cedar log buffer around the island to help preserve it. Its size, approximately two acres (0.81 ha) in 1853, shrank by 75% in 162 years, to about 0.25 acres (0.10 ha) in 1971. Today only 55 feet (17 m) by 145 feet (44 m) of the island remains. A newly formed group called the Squaw Island Preservation Society has raised citizen support to protect the island and its unique place in science and local history, after state officials said they would no longer maintain it. Work on the preservation was completed in Summer 2001.

As with other places with "squaw" in the name, efforts began in the 21st century to have the name changed, since the use of the term is seen as insensitive. These efforts became successful with the announcement in October 2021 that the U.S. Board on Geographic Names had approved the name "Skenoh Island", effective immediately, based on recommendations from the New York State Geographic Names Committee, the New York State Museum and the Commissioner of the New York State Department of Environmental Conservation. The word "skenoh" translates to "health" or "peace" in the Seneca language.

== History ==
The first steamboat in the Finger Lakes region was the Enterprise, which was launched in 1825. Canandaigua Lake's steamboat era ran from 1827 with the launching of the Lady of the Lake and ended in 1935 when the Idler discontinued passenger service. There were fourteen major boats that provided commercial service on Canandaigua Lake. Today, the Canandaigua Lady, a 19th-century replica of a double-decked paddleboat, continues this tradition.

The Native Americans and white settlers signed the Treaty of Canandaigua just north of the lake. This parchment, which is in the Memorial Museum, has the names of a number of famous Indian chiefs including Red Jacket, Cornplanter, Handsome Lake, Farmer's Brother, and Fish Carrier.

The lake is a popular second home destination for families from nearby Rochester, New York, as well as other parts of the Northeast.

== Points of interest ==
- Canandaigua Lake State Marine Park is located in the City of Canandaigua on the lake's north end. It offers a boat launch for powerboats and fishing access from May to mid-October.
- Sonnenberg Gardens and Mansion State Historic Park is located near the north end of the lake.
- County Road 12 into Naples (town), New York at the south end of the lake, which is known for its views of the lake and is a favorite of fall travelers. Also along the road is the new South Bristol Overlook.
- The Canandaigua Wine Trail, which is a collection of wineries, breweries, bed & breakfasts, hotels, attractions, shops, and restaurants around Canandaigua Lake.
- The Canandaigua Lady, a double-decker paddle wheel boat and steamboat replica that offers public cruises on Canandaigua Lake from May through October.
- Fishing is widely popular. The lake is home to a few species of salmonids (lake trout, brown trout, rainbow trout), largemouth bass, smallmouth bass, chain pickerel, and panfish, including yellow perch, blue gills, pumpkinseed, rock bass, black crappie and bullheads. Carp can be found near public access points and close to stream beds filtering into the lake. Bowfishing and spearfishing is strictly prohibited on the lake. Fisherman can sometimes be seen hooking mudpuppies, a large member of the salamander family that live their lives entirely underwater and feed on crayfish, small fish, and snails. They can grow to up to 16 inches (41 cm) in length and have gills that protrude from outside of their bodies.
- Four public access points are located on Canandaigua Lake.
- Five full-service marinas are located on Canandaigua Lake and all offer service, sales, rentals, docking facilities, and storage. Sutter's Marina and Seager Marine are located at the north end, German Brothers Marina on the west side of the lake, Canandaigua Boatworks on the east side of the lake, and Smith Boys at the south end. Canandaigua Sailboard at the north end offers non-motorized watercraft options.

== Pop-culture references ==
- Kristen Wiig is an American actress, comedian, screenwriter, and producer was born in Canandaigua, NY
- Humphrey Bogart spent several summers at his parents' Canandaigua Lake cottage when he was a boy.
- On the television series Copper, Hattie Lemaster, former slave and mother of main cast character Sara Freeman, mentions that she'd like to visit Canandaigua Lake in an episode from the 2012–2013 season.
