= List of county routes in Ontario County, New York =

US 2Cont County routes in Ontario County, New York, provide main arterial connections that are not otherwise provided by state highways. County routes never enter villages or cities; instead, they usually terminate at the village or city line or at an intersection with another county or state highway. The posted road names of county routes in Ontario County are "County Road #"; other names for the roads are rarely posted and are thus infrequently used. The non-numerical name or names of the route are given in the "via" column below.

== Routes 1–25 ==
Route	Length (mi)	Length (km)	From	Via	To	Notes
CR 1	4.00	6.44	Rushville village line	Deep Run–Rushville Road in Gorham	NY 364	
CR 2	2.58	4.15	US 20A	Fishers Corners–Bristol Road in Bristol	US 20A / NY 64	
CR 3	4.63	7.45	Bloomfield village line in East Bloomfield	Victor–Holcomb Road	Victor village line in Victor	Transferred to the state of New York on September 1, 1996; now part of NY 444
CR 4	13.65	21.97	Canandaigua city line in Canandaigua	Castle Road	CR 6 at the Geneva city line in Geneva	
CR 5	4.89	7.87	NY 14A in Hall	Post Road in Seneca	US 20 / NY 5	
CR 6	17.45	28.08	Yates County line in Geneva (becomes CR 15)	Old Pre-Emption Road	Wayne County line in Phelps (becomes CR 338)	
CR 7	5.69	9.16	CR 13	Slack Road in Manchester	Wayne County Line	Labeled as "Atwater Street" in the hamlet of Port Gibson. Labeled as "Port Gibson Road" between Route 31 and the county line. Becomes Wayne County's "Port Gibson-East Palmyra Road".
CR 8	8.17	13.15	NY 332 in Canandaigua	Padelford Road	Wayne County line in Farmington (becomes CR 308)	
CR 9	3.24	5.21	Victor village line	Church Street and Victor–Egypt Road in Victor	Monroe County line (becomes CR 52)	
CR 10	1.87	3.01	US 20 / NY 5	Townline Road on Canandaigua–Hopewell town line	CR 4	
CR 11	3.53	5.68	Yates County line (becomes CR 39)	East Lake Road in Gorham	NY 364	
CR 12	5.54	8.92	NY 21 in Naples	Bristol Springs and Naples Roads	NY 64 in South Bristol	
CR 13 (1)	3.32	5.34	NY 21 village of Shortsville	Shortsville–Clifton Springs Road	NY 96 in Town of Phelps	Labeled as "Main Street" in the villages of Shortsville and Clifton Springs. Opposite side of Shortsville Road which connects to CR 41.
CR 13 (2)	0.46	0.74	Clifton Springs village line	Lester Road in Phelps	NY 96	
CR 14	3.87	6.23	NY 65	North Bloomfield–Ionia Road in West Bloomfield	NY 64	
CR 15	3.77	6.07	Livingston County line (becomes CR 41)	Richmond Mills Road in Richmond	CR 40	
CR 16	8.70	14.00	NY 21	West Lake Road in Canandaigua	Canandaigua city line	
CR 17	3.31	5.33	CR 18 in Gorham	Hopewell–Gorham Road	US 20 / NY 5 in Hopewell	
CR 18	7.41	11.93	NY 245 in Gorham	Lincoln Hill Road	NY 364 in Canandaigua	Southernmost 1.14 miles (1.83 km) was NY 941E prior to September 1, 1996
CR 19	1.89	3.04	NY 21 in Hopewell	Littleville Road	CR 13 in Manchester	
CR 20	4.14	6.66	US 20 / NY 5 in Seneca	Flint–Orleans Road	NY 488	
CR 21	2.13	3.43	NY 53	Italy Valley Road in Naples	Yates County line (becomes CR 18)	
CR 22	0.47	0.76	CR 4	Hanna Road in Canandaigua	NY 21	
CR 23	5.78	9.30	CR 20 near NY 488	Orleans–Fort Hill Road in Phelps	Seneca County Line	Overlaps McIvor Road from Orleans to Fort Hill, then overlaps Fort Hill Road temporarily, then becomes its own road "Orleans-Fort Hill Road" between Fort Hill and Oaks Corners. Labeled as "Cross Road" between CR 6 and the county line.
CR 24			Yates County line (becomes CR 27)	Dickerman Road in Gorham	CR 29 in Gorham	
CR 25	3.37	5.42	Clifton Springs village line in Manchester	Five Waters–Clifton Springs Road	NY 88 in Phelps	Easternmost 0.33 miles (0.53 km) was NY 941C prior to September 1, 1996

== Routes 26 and up ==
Route	Length (mi)	Length (km)	From	Via	To	Notes
CR 26	2.14	3.44	NY 88	Vienna Road in Phelps	Wayne County line (becomes CR 334)	
CR 27	4.83	7.77	CR 25	Plainsville Road in Manchester	Wayne County line (becomes CR 318)	
CR 28	9.09	14.63	NY 332 in Canandaigua	Macedon Road	Wayne County line in Farmington (becomes CR 312)	
CR 29			Yates County line in Seneca (becomes CR 2)	Hershey Road	NY 245	Part north of CR 24 was NY 941F prior to September 1, 1996
CR 30	5.46	8.79	Bloomfield village line in East Bloomfield	North Bloomfield Road	Canandaigua city line in Canandaigua	
CR 31			VA Hospital south entrance	Bushwood Lane in Canandaigua	NY 21	Former number
CR 32	11.37	18.30	US 20A in Bristol	Canandaigua–Bristol and Bristol Roads	NY 21 in Canandaigua	Part east of Hickox Road was NY 941D prior to September 1, 1996
CR 33	14.97	24.09	Naples village line in Naples	West Hollow Road	US 20A in Richmond	
CR 34	1.56	2.51	CR 33	Boswells Corners–South Bristol Road in South Bristol	NY 64	
CR 35	2.03	3.27	NY 65	West Bloomfield–Pittsford Road in West Bloomfield	Monroe County line (becomes CR 66)	
CR 36 (1)	5.46	8.79	Naples village line	Hunt Hollow Road in Naples	Livingston County line (becomes CR 36A)	
CR 36 (2)	8.60	13.84	Livingston County line in Canadice (becomes CR 36A)	West Lake Road	US 20A in Richmond	
CR 37	17.09	27.50	Livingston County line in Canadice (becomes CR 42)	Canadice Hill and South Roads	US 20 / NY 5 / NY 65 in West Bloomfield	
CR 39	3.56	5.73	Bloomfield village line	East Bloomfield–Ionia Road in East Bloomfield	NY 64	
CR 40	7.00	11.27	CR 15 in Richmond	East Bloomfield–Allens Hill Road	Bloomfield village line in East Bloomfield	
CR 41	8.46	13.62	Monroe County line in Victor (becomes CR 53)	Boughton Hill Road	CR 8 in Farmington	At CR 8: Becomes Shortsville Road which connects to CR 13.
CR 42	2.12	3.41	NY 251	Wangum Road and Main Street Fishers in Victor	NY 96	
CR 43	2.40	3.86	NY 488	Clifton Springs–Orleans Road in Phelps	CR 13	
CR 44			NY 96	Turk Hill Road in Victor	Monroe County line (becomes CR 50)	Former number
CR 46	4.08	6.57	Canandaigua city line in Canandaigua	Phelps Street	CR 47 in Hopewell	
CR 47	4.14	6.66	US 20 / NY 5	Ennerdale–Hopewell Road in Hopewell	NY 488	
CR 48	0.37	0.60	CR 46	Road to Ontario County offices in Hopewell	Dead end	
CR 49	0.42	0.68	Dead end at county landfill	Post Lane in Seneca	US 20 / NY 5	
CR 50	0.04	0.06	NY 364	Lakeshore Drive (Town of Hopewell)	US 20 / NY 5	Continuation of Lakeshore Drive between City of Canandaigua-maintained portion and US 20 / NY 5.
CR 181	0.40	0.64	CR 18	Old Lincoln Hill Road in Hopewell	Dead end	

== See also ==
- County routes in New York
