= New York State Route 88 =

Highway in New York

New York State Route 88
- Map of Finger Lakes region in central New York with NY 88 highlighted in red

Route information
- Maintained by NYSDOT and the village of Newark
- Length: 20.62 mi (33.18 km)
- Existed: 1930–present

Major junctions
- South end: NY 96 in Phelps
- NY 31 in Newark
- North end: NY 104 in Sodus

Location
- Country: United States
- State: New York
- Counties: Ontario, Wayne

Highway system
- New York Highways; Interstate; US; State; Reference; Parkways
← I-88	→ NY 89

New York State Route 88 (NY 88) is a north–south state highway in the Finger Lakes region of New York in the United States. It extends for 20.62 miles (33.18 km) from an intersection with NY 96 in the Ontario County village of Phelps to a junction with NY 104 in the Wayne County town of Sodus. In between, NY 88 passes through the Village of Newark, where it intersects NY 31 and crosses over the Erie Canal. NY 88 originally extended south to the city of Canandaigua when it was assigned as part of the 1930 renumbering of state highways in New York. It was truncated to its current length in August 1972. According to the New York State Department of Transportation (NYSDOT), the NY 382 designation is reserved for the NY 88 alignment. No timetable exists for the redesignation of NY 88 to NY 382.

== Route description ==
All but 1.86 miles (2.99 km) of NY 88 are maintained by NYSDOT. The lone locally maintained section exists within the village of Newark, where the highway is village-maintained from Rose Drive (12 blocks south of NY 31) to the northern village line.

NY 88 begins at a commercialized intersection with NY 96 in the otherwise residential western portion of the village of Phelps in northeastern Ontario County. It heads north on Newark Street, running along the west edge of several residential blocks before leaving the village and descending into a narrow cut to pass under the New York State Thruway (Interstate 90 or I-90). Past the Thruway, the route curves to the northwest, briefly following the outlet of Canandaigua Lake across rolling farmland. The outlet turns southwest ahead of a junction with County Road 25, at which point NY 88 turns to follow a more northerly routing into Wayne County and the sprawling village of Newark just north of the county line.

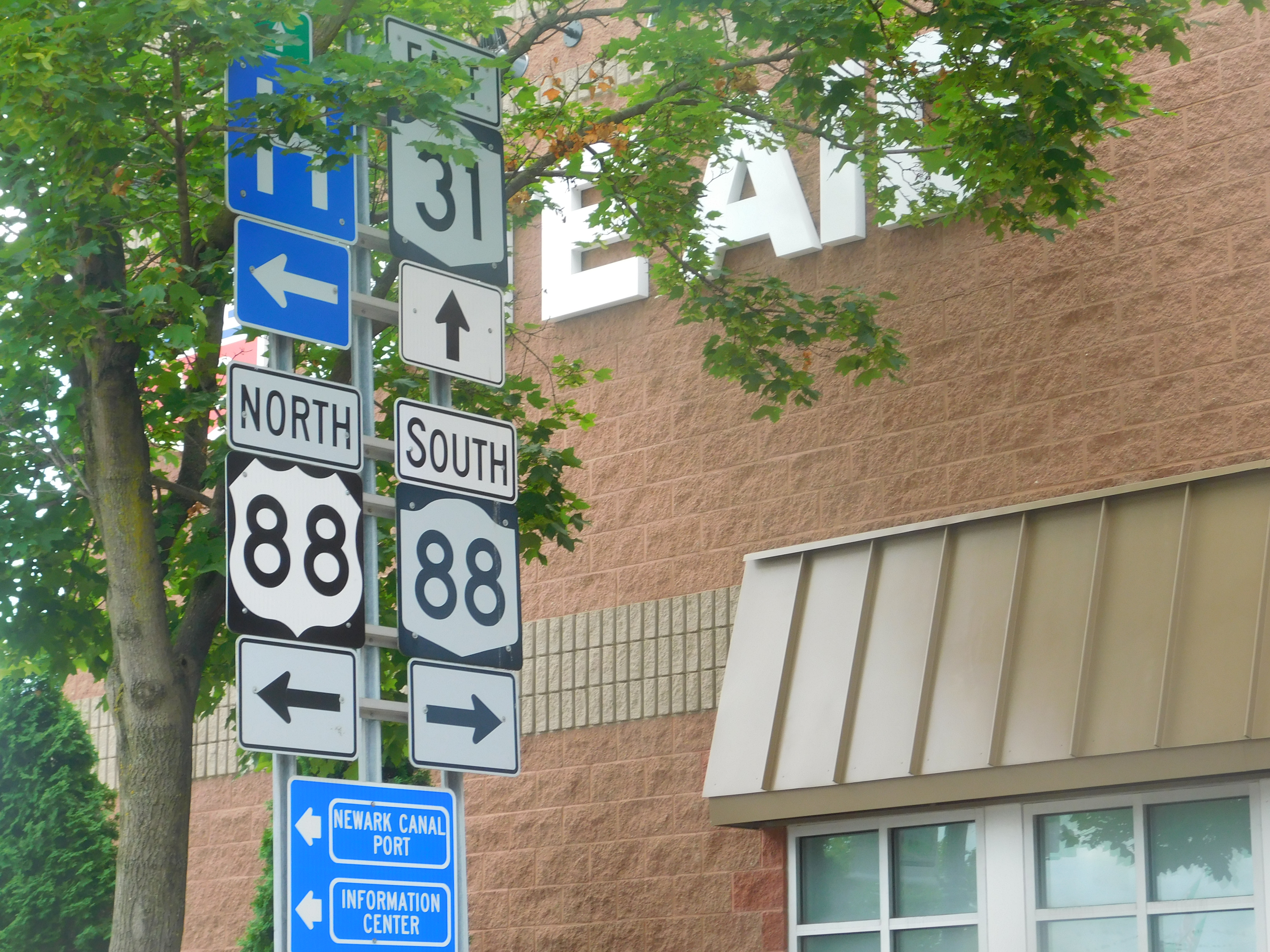
Shields at junction of NY 31 and NY 88 (with erroneous U.S Route shields)

In Newark, NY 88 follows Main Street past several blocks of homes to the village's commercial center, located adjacent to the Erie Canal. Here, NY 88 intersects NY 31, which serves as Newark's main east–west commercial strip. The route continues on, crossing the canal and serving two more commercial blocks prior to passing through another residential section of the village. As the route leaves Newark, it crosses over the CSX Transportation-owned Rochester Subdivision on an overpass. From here, NY 88 curves to the northeast, crossing and briefly paralleling Ganargua Creek through the rural town of Arcadia. The creek splits from NY 88 after 2.5 miles (4.0 km) to continue eastward toward Lyons, while NY 88 heads north toward the village of Sodus.

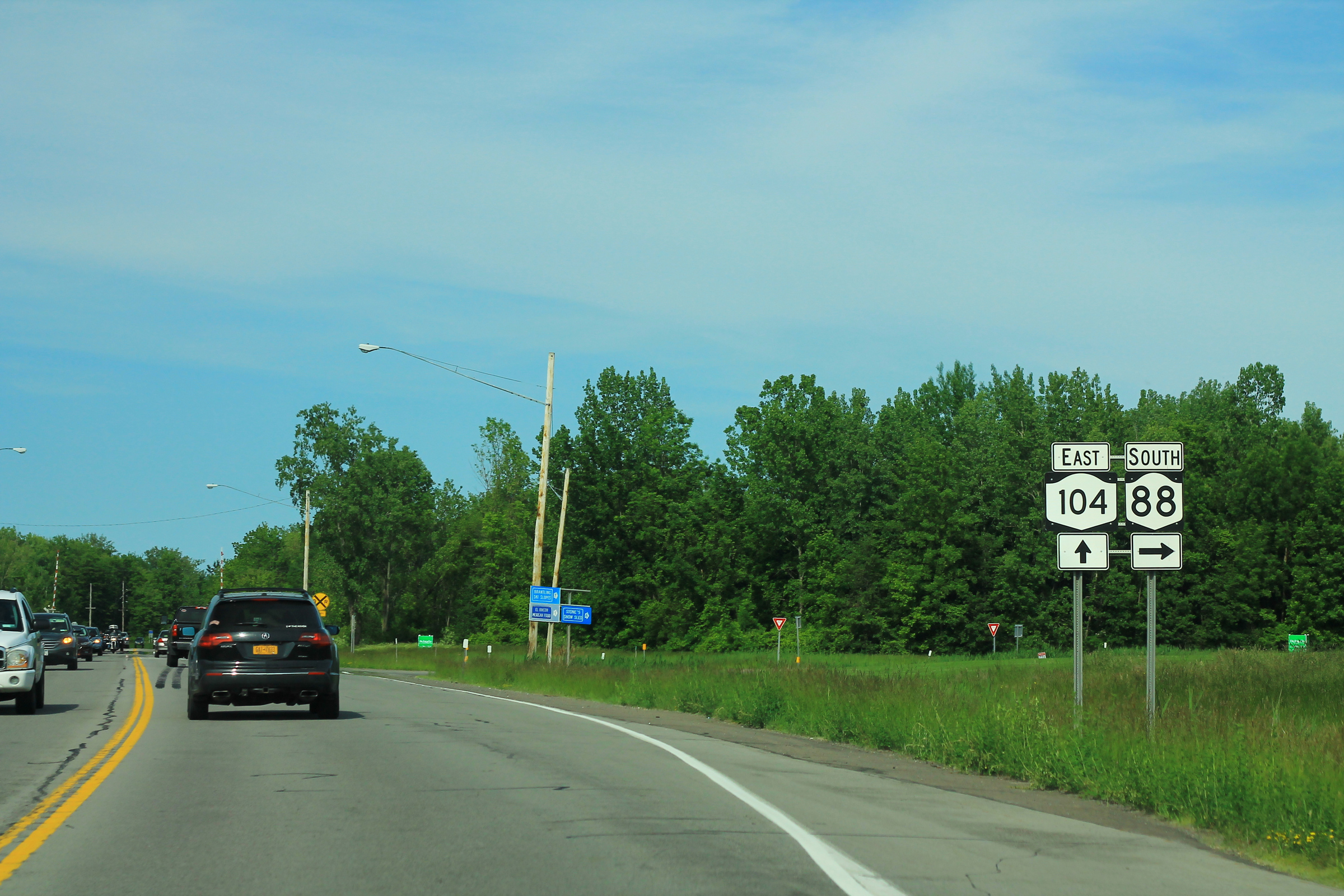
NY 88's northern terminus

Between Newark and Sodus, NY 88 swerves to the west and east as it navigates the hilly Wayne County terrain, passing through the hamlets of Mud Mills and Fairville and loosely paralleling the Ontario Midland Railroad in the process. The route traverses little more than farmland on its way to Sodus, where the route becomes Carlton Street. At a residential intersection with West Main Street (part of the old Ridge Road), NY 88 turns west and follows West Main Street out of Sodus. Ridge Road separates from NY 88 just past the village line in the town of Sodus, leaving NY 88 unnamed for a short, undeveloped distance between Ridge Road and its northern terminus at NY 104.

== History ==
NY 88 was assigned as part of the 1930 renumbering of state highways in New York to an alignment extending from the city of Canandaigua to the village of Sodus via the villages of Phelps and Newark. It began at the intersection of West Avenue and Main Street in downtown Canandaigua and overlapped with NY 21 to the hamlet of Chapin, where it split from NY 21 to follow modern NY 488 to Phelps. In Sodus, the route initially ended at the junction of Carlton and Main Streets as the latter carried NY 3 at the time. NY 3 was replaced by U.S. Route 104 (US 104) from Rochester to Maple View c. 1935. The super two highway north of Sodus was completed in the mid-1960s as a realignment of US 104, at which time NY 88 was extended westward along West Main Street to meet the new highway. NY 88 was truncated on its southern end to Phelps in August 1972 as part of a statewide elimination of overlaps, such as NY 88 and NY 96. The old alignment between NY 21 and NY 96 was re-designated as NY 488.

The route is one of two state-maintained highways in New York numbered "88"; the other is I-88 in the eastern half of the state. NYSDOT has explicitly reserved the NY 382 designation as a replacement for NY 88, presumably for the purpose of eliminating the numerical duplication with I-88. No timetable has been established for the redesignation.

== Major intersections ==
County	Location	mi	km	Destinations	Notes
Ontario	Village of Phelps	0.00	0.00	NY 96 (Main Street)	Southern terminus
Wayne	Newark	6.21	9.99	NY 31 – Lyons	
Wayne	Town of Sodus	20.62	33.18	NY 104	Northern terminus
1.000 mi = 1.609 km; 1.000 km = 0.621 mi
