= Red Wing FFA =

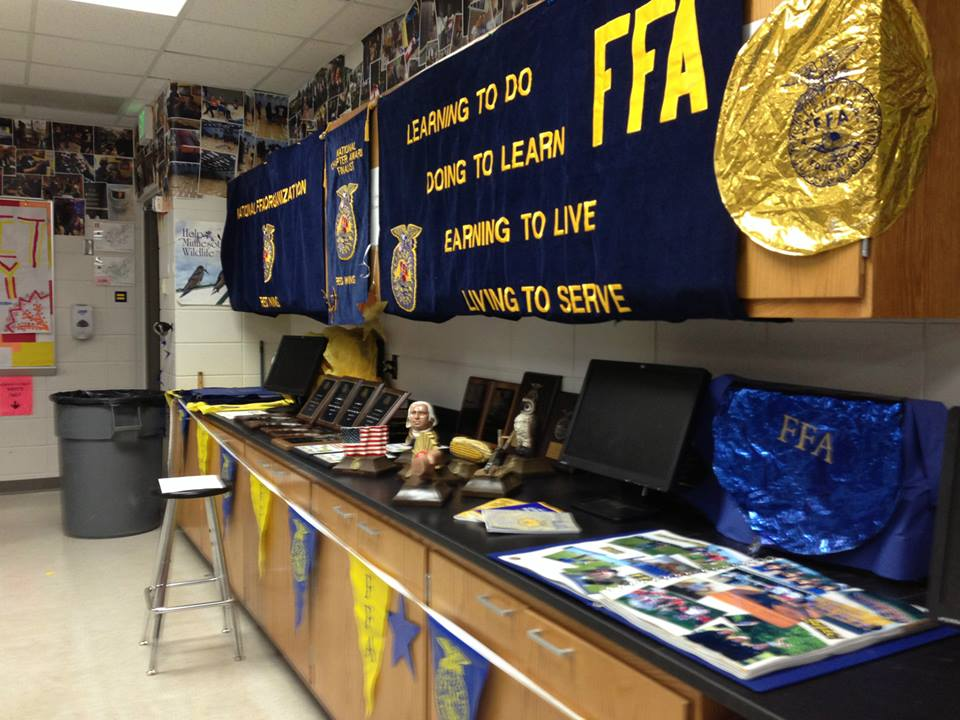
Red Wing FFA

The Red Wing FFA chapter, in Red Wing, Minnesota, United States, is a youth-led organization that is part of the National FFA Organization, which was founded more than 85 years ago. Developed by the Future Farmers of America, today it is simply called "FFA" as it prepares young leaders for a successful future through agricultural learning. The Red Wing FFA has been a program at Red Wing High School for many years. Starting in 2009, the chapter has been nationally recognized as of 2012.

== Mission ==
The mission for the National FFA Organization is:

"The National FFA Organization is a dynamic youth leadership organization that strives to make a positive difference in the lives of students by developing their potential for premier leadership, personal growth and career success through agricultural education."

== Events ==
The Red Wing FFA chapter is open to students in grades 8-12, and is the largest organization at Red Wing High School. The chapter elects officers every year. Through the years, the leaders of this organization have developed annual events that are popular throughout the city of Red Wing.

=== Earth Day and Day of Caring and Sharing ===
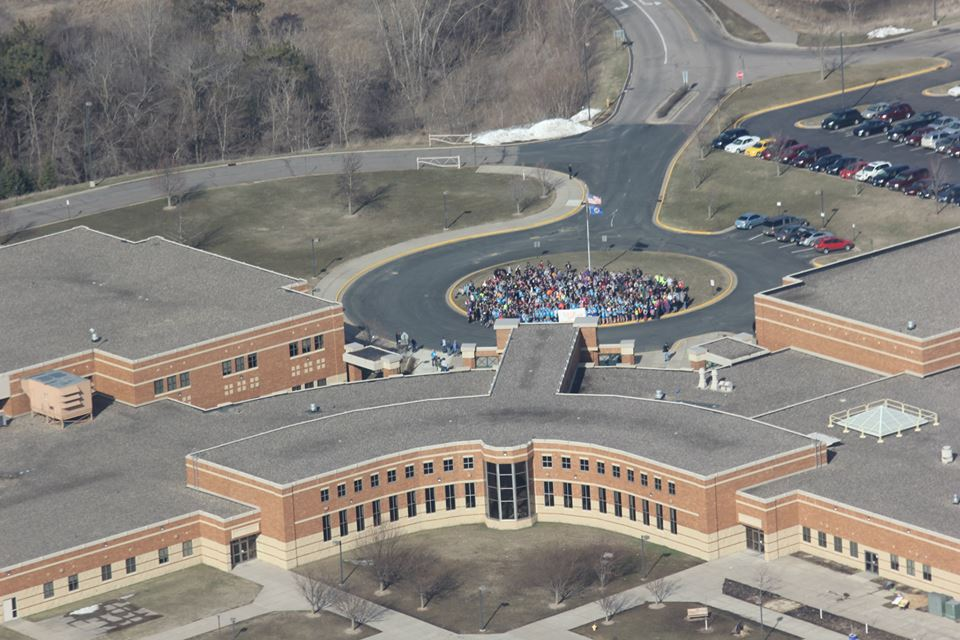
RW FFA Earth Day aerial shot, 2013

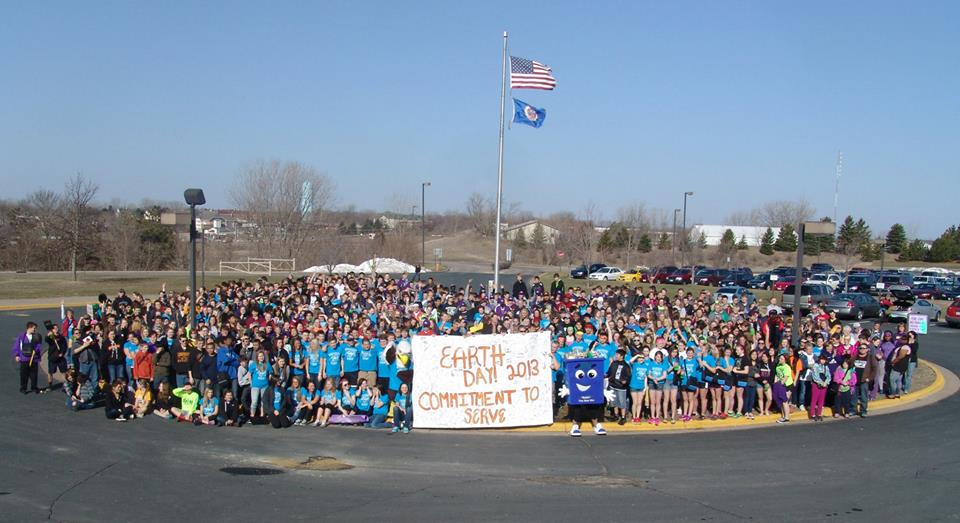
RW FFA Earth Day commitment to serve, 2013

Earth Day and Day of Caring and Sharing is a school-wide event. Every student signs up for one of two kinds of service project. One option is to do a service project in the community of Red Wing, to help clean, restore, and maintain its beauty. The second option has to with a long-standing tradition at Red Wing High School. The first-graders in the community all go to the high school on this day and learn about animals, the environment, and how they can help. The first-graders paint bird houses, go through a tour of displays and activities put together by teachers and students, and visit a petting zoo. This has been a successful and growing event since 2009.

=== Agricultural Open House ===
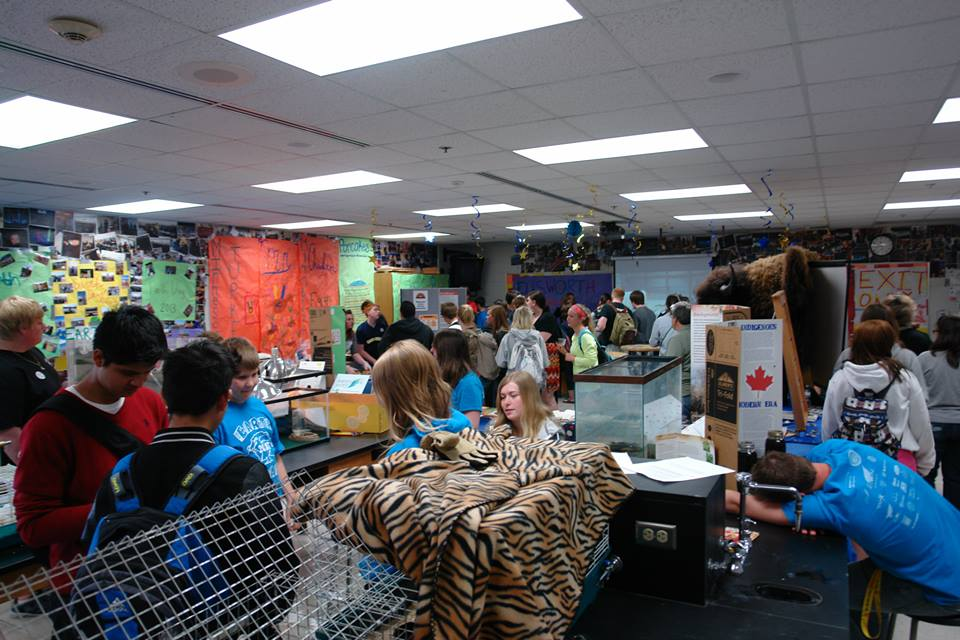
RW FFA Open House, 2013

The Agricultural Open House is a large event put on by the FFA chapter to display what the agriculture department does at Red Wing High School, and how agriculture is used throughout the community in Red Wing and surrounding areas. This event is open to all of the city of Red Wing. On the day of the event, students display their agricultural experience projects they have been working on through the year, and colleges promote themselves and educate people on their agricultural departments. The Goodhue County Dairy Princesses attend the event to talk about what they do and how they benefit the community. This event educates the city of Red Wing on the agricultural side of the community and continues to grow every year.

=== Plant sale ===
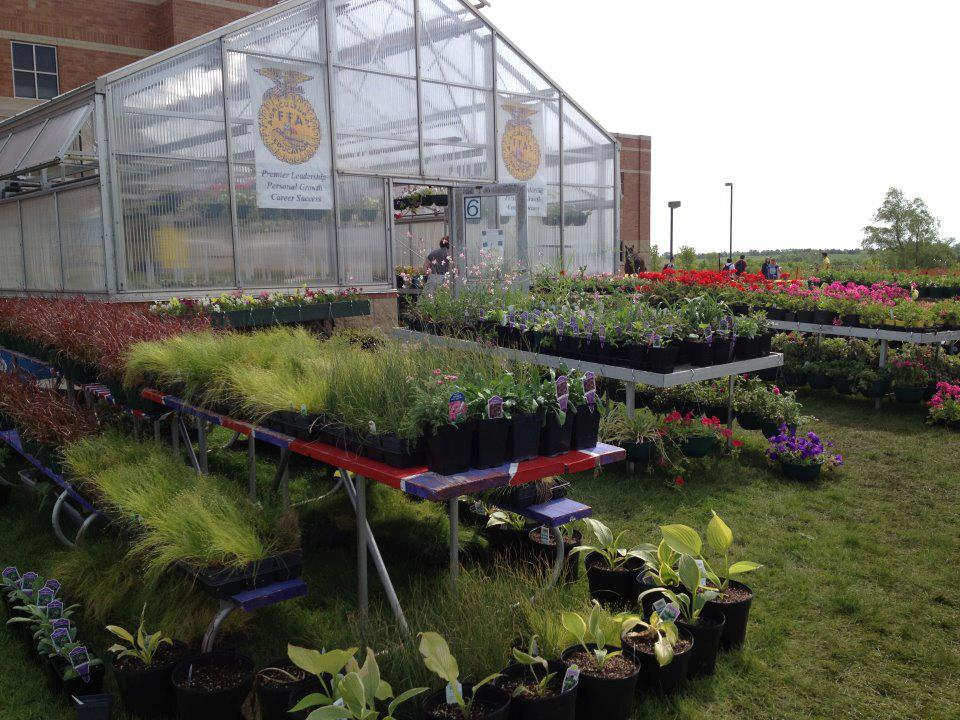
RW FFA plant sale, 2012

The agricultural department at Red Wing High School holds an annual plant sale. The students in the greenhouse classes, and the Red Wing FFA chapter, work during the year to grow plants for their end-of-the-year sale. This sale is usually held on Agricultural Open House day, and extends through the weekend.

=== Chapter meetings ===
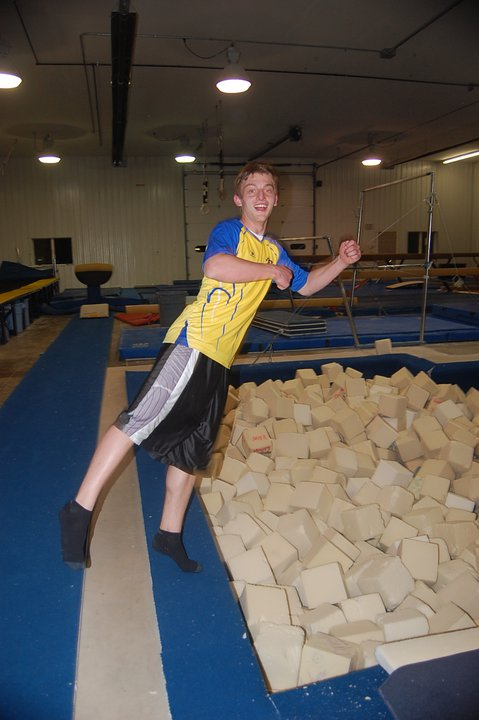
RW FFA chapter meeting, 2011

Red Wing FFA officers hold a monthly meeting for chapter members. This is to discuss upcoming events and get students involved in the program.

=== Fruit sales ===
The Red Wing FFA Chapter has a fruit sale fundraiser every year. The sale raised $20,000 in 2011.
