= New York State Route 488 =

State highway in Ontario County, New York

New York State Route 488
- Map of the western Finger Lakes region with NY 488 highlighted in red

Route information
- Maintained by NYSDOT
- Length: 9.53 mi (15.34 km)
- Existed: August 1972–present

Major junctions
- South end: NY 21 in Hopewell
- North end: NY 96 in Phelps

Location
- Country: United States
- State: New York
- Counties: Ontario

Highway system
- New York Highways; Interstate; US; State; Reference; Parkways
← I-487	→ I-490

New York State Route 488 (NY 488) is a state highway entirely in Ontario County, New York, in the United States. It extends for 9.53 miles (15.34 km) from an intersection with NY 21 in the town of Hopewell, near the city of Canandaigua, to a junction with NY 96 midway between the villages of Phelps and Clifton Springs. NY 488 also passes through the hamlet of Orleans, located within the town of Phelps. Although NY 488 is signed as a north–south highway, most of the route follows an east–west alignment. NY 488 was originally designated as part of NY 88 in the 1930 renumbering of state highways in New York. NY 88 was truncated to the village of Phelps in August 1972, at which time its former routing between NY 21 and NY 96 was renumbered to NY 488, eliminating an overlap with NY 96.

== Route description ==
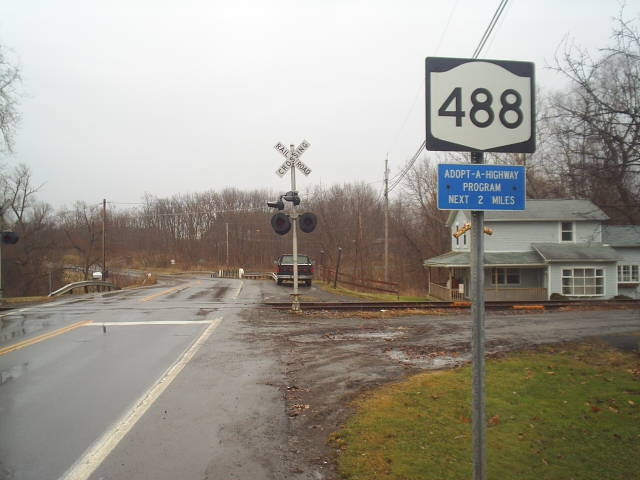
NY 488 heading eastbound from its western terminus in Chapin. The Finger Lakes Railway is visible in the distance.

NY 488 begins at an intersection with NY 21 in the hamlet of Chapin, a small community within the Ontario County town of Hopewell. The highway progresses eastward, crossing the Finger Lakes Railway at a grade crossing less than 100 yards (91 m) from NY 21. Just past the railroad, the route makes a slight turn to the northeast for 0.25 miles (0.40 km) before curving back to the east and continuing across open farmland. As NY 488 crosses the town of Hopewell, it serves a handful of isolated homes and intersects several north–south highways of local importance, including County Road 47 (CR 47). The route continues eastward into the town of Phelps, where it serves a pair of large farms on its way to the small hamlet of Orleans, located on both the western bank of Flint Creek and the right-of-way of the now-defunct Pennsylvania Railroad (PRR).

In the western portion of Orleans, NY 488 intersects with the north–south CR 20, which leads to most of the hamlet's residences. NY 488, meanwhile, bypasses most of the community to the northwest as it makes a gradual turn to the north to follow Flint Creek and the old PRR right-of-way toward the village of Phelps. Outside of Orleans, the route reenters mostly rural surroundings as it approaches a junction with CR 43. While CR 43 heads north toward Clifton Springs, NY 488 turns to the northeast, following the creek and the old rail bed past the large reservoir serving the village of Newark. At an intersection with Trimble and Griffith Roads, the highway turns back to the north, matching a similar curve in the creek's routing. NY 488 continues on, crossing the former right-of-way of the Lehigh Valley Railroad and passing Midlakes High School on an otherwise nondescript stretch before ending at an intersection with NY 96 west of the village of Phelps.

== History ==
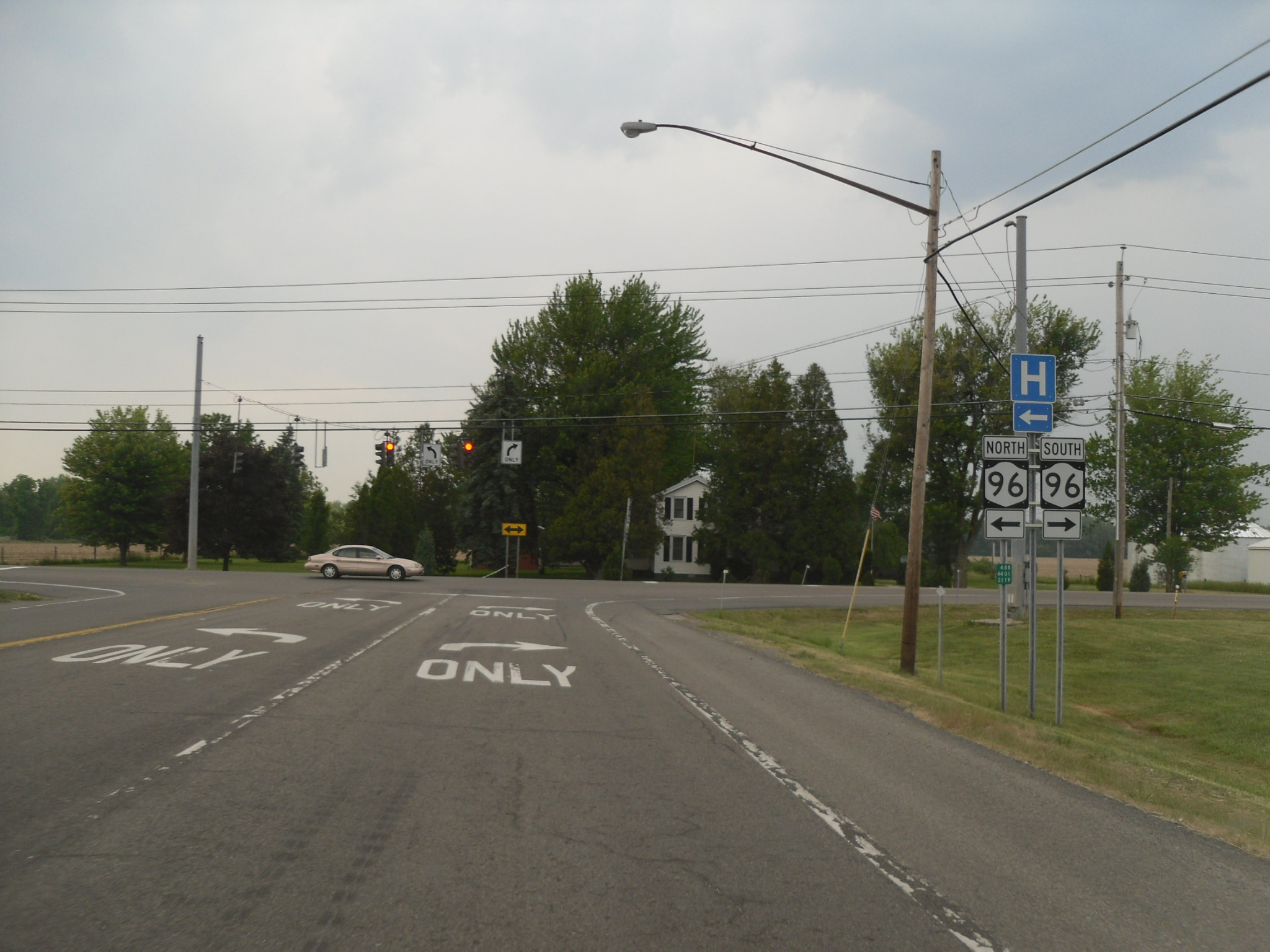
NY 488 approaching its eastern terminus, a signalized intersection with NY 96 in Phelps

On May 25, 1915, the state of New York let a contract to improve an 8.63-mile (13.89 km) highway connecting the city of Canandaigua to the hamlet of Orleans to state highway standards. The reconstruction of the highway was 70 percent complete by 1920 and finished by 1926, by which time the highway was added to the state highway system as State Highway 1278 (SH 1278). The north–south highway connecting Orleans to the village of Phelps was rebuilt to state highway standards c. 1930 as SH 1863. In the 1930 renumbering of state highways in New York, SH 1278 and SH 1863 became part of the new NY 88, which began in the village of Sodus and extended southward through Phelps to the intersection of West Avenue and Main Street in Canandaigua. NY 88 was truncated on its southern end to Phelps c. 1973. Its former routing from NY 21 in the hamlet of Chapin to NY 96 west of Phelps was renumbered to NY 488 as part of a project statewide to eliminate useless overlaps such as NY 88 and NY 96.

== Major intersections ==
The entire route is in Ontario County.

Location	mi	km	Destinations	Notes
Hopewell	0.00	0.00	NY 21	Southern terminus, Hamlet of Chapin
Town of Phelps	9.53	15.34	NY 96 – Clifton Springs, Phelps	Northern terminus
1.000 mi = 1.609 km; 1.000 km = 0.621 mi
