= Midlakes High School =

Location
- 1554 Route 488; Clifton Springs, New York 14432; United States
- Coordinates: 42°57′28″N 77°5′58″W

Information
- Type: Public
- School district: Phelps-Clifton Springs Central School District
- NCES School ID: 362289003214
- Principal: Dan McAlpin
- Teaching staff: 74.00 (on an FTE basis)
- Grades: 7-12
- Enrollment: 687 (2023-2024)
- Student to teacher ratio: 9.28
- Campus: Rural
- Colors: Black, Carolina Blue and White
- Athletics conference: Section V (NYSPHSAA)
- Mascot: Screaming Eagles
- Yearbook: Reflections
- Website: secondary.midlakes.org

Midlakes High School is a public high school in Phelps, Ontario County, New York, and the only high school operated by the Phelps Clifton Springs Central School District. The high school serves all of the town of Phelps and village of Clifton Springs, and portions of the towns of Manchester, Seneca, Geneva, and Hopewell. It is attached to the Midlakes Middle School.

The school has around 700 students at around 110 per graduating class. It offers six Advanced Placement courses: Calculus AB, Biology, US History, World History, Language, and Literature.

== Athletics ==
The school's sports teams are the Screaming Eagles, and their colors are black, Carolina blue and white. They are in Section V.

Athletically, the Boys Volleyball and Boys Track teams coached by Kyle Salisbury and Adien Cort (current coach) respectively have won recent sectional titles. The Volleyball team has recently won sectional titles in 2006 and 2007. The basketball team won a Section V title in the '08-'09 season. The Cheerleading Team has won sectional titles in 2010 in their winter and fall seasons, and a title in the 2011 winter season. John Lombardi is the Athletic Director.
