= Phelps Town Hall =

- U.S. National Register of Historic Places
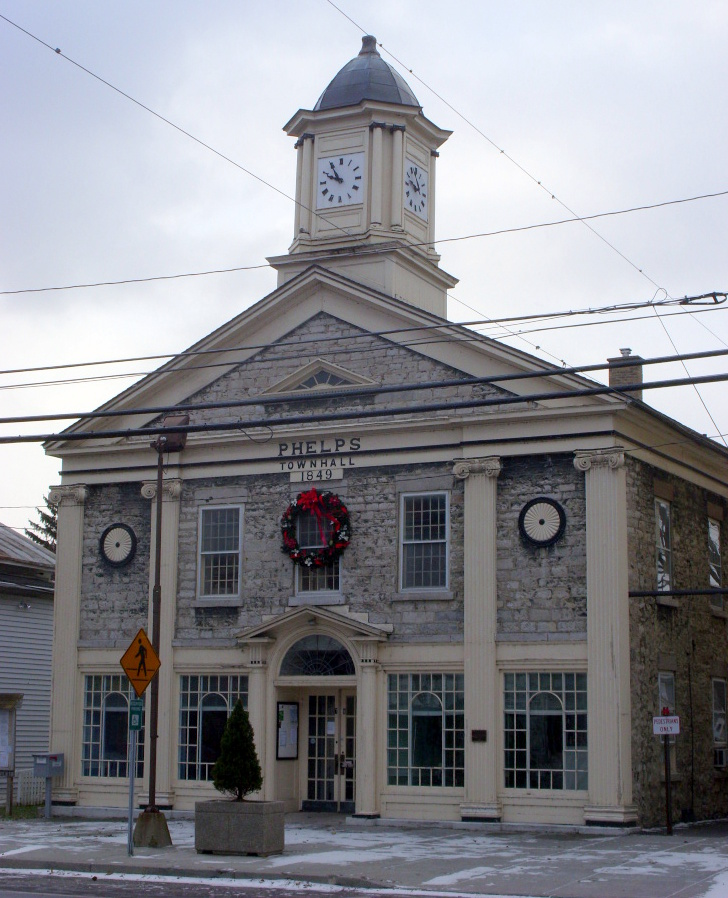
- Phelps Town Hall, December 2008

- Location within New York Location within the United States
- Location: 79 Main St., Phelps, New York
- Coordinates: 42°57′25″N 77°3′28″W
- Area: less than one acre
- Built: 1849
- Architect: Bloomer, John, & Son; Warner, J Foster, et al.
- Architectural style: Greek Revival, Classical Revival
- NRHP reference No.: 96000485
- Added to NRHP: April 25, 1996

Phelps Town Hall is a historic town hall located at Phelps in Ontario County, New York. It was built in 1849 and remodeled in 1912–1913. It is architecturally significant as a Greek Revival style town hall with distinguished Neoclassical style modifications. It features an elegant clock tower with paired, fluted Corinthian columns.

It was listed on the National Register of Historic Places in 1996.
