= Murder of Sam Nordquist =

2025 torture and killing in New York, US

- Location: Finger Lakes, New York, U.S.
- Date: February 2, 2025
- Attack type: Torture, homicide, rape
- Victim: Sam Nordquist
- Perpetrators: Precious Arzuaga, Emily Motyka, Jennifer "Brooklyn" Quijano
- Motive: Under investigation
- Accused: Patrick Goodwin, Kyle Sage, Kimberly Sochia, Thomas Eaves

Sam Nordquist, a 24-year-old transgender man from Red Wing, Minnesota, was killed in Hopewell, New York, in February 2025 after being tortured for over a month. Nordquist had been tortured between December 2024 and February 2025 before being killed, according to a police news release on February 14, 2025.

In Hopewell, the New York State Police, working with local law enforcement, arrested five people, ages 19 to 38, who were charged with second-degree murder with depraved indifference. On February 20, two more suspects, a 29-year-old woman and a 21-year-old man, were charged with the same offense. Four of the suspects pled guilty to murder charges. In September 2026, two of the perpetrators, Precious Arzuaga and Jennifer Quijano, were sentenced to life in prison without parole for the torture and killing of Nordquist.

== Sam Nordquist ==
Sam Nordquist was born in Red Wing, Minnesota, and attended Red Wing High School. He received his high school diploma from Face to Face Academy in Saint Paul, Minnesota, which has established a scholarship and memorial garden in his legacy. He worked at a group home for people with disabilities in Little Canada, Minnesota. Nordquist was biracial and was close with his mother and two siblings.

Nordquist left Minnesota on September 28, 2024, with plans to travel to Geneva, New York to meet his online girlfriend, 38-year-old Precious Arzuaga (born May 28, 1986), and return two weeks later. Nordquist instead decided to stay in New York with Arzuaga to work on their relationship. His family lost touch with him after January 1, 2025, and noted that, in his communications up to his disappearance, he seemed "not like himself." According to his mother, the family requested multiple wellness checks in the months leading up to their missing persons report, which were declined by the local police. Nordquist's mother also noted an email from Ontario County Social Services in December, showing that he failed to return to their offices after speaking to them about a need for an "escape plan."

== Death ==
Nordquist had been reported missing since December 2024. The New York State Police did a wellness check on February 9 after Nordquist's family filed a missing persons report with the Ontario County, New York sheriff that day. Deputies searched a room at Patty’s Lodge Motel in Hopewell, Ontario County, where Nordquist and at least one of the suspects were reportedly living together, and discovered evidence of the abuse.

Human remains thought to be those of Nordquist were found in a Yates County field on February 13, about 50 miles (80 kilometers) southeast of Rochester. According to police, Nordquist's body was moved in an attempt to conceal the crime. The date of death has been reported as February 2, 2025.

In a news conference on February 14, Captain Kelly Swift of the New York State Police reported that evidence and witness statements suggested that Nordquist endured prolonged physical and psychological abuse from multiple individuals prior to his death. Swift called the case "one of the most horrific crimes" that she had investigated in her law enforcement career. According to police reports, the suspects raped Nordquist with a table leg and broomstick; beat him with sticks, dog toys, ropes, and belts; denied him proper nutrition and hydration; forced him to consume urine, feces, and tobacco juice; and poured bleach over him before he succumbed to his injuries. The abuse reportedly went on from early December 2024 to February 2025.

== Investigation and legal charges ==
The Ontario County District Attorney stated there was no evidence the killing was a hate crime, stating that "his assailants were known to each other, identified as LGBTQ+, and at least one of the defendants lived with Sam in the time period leading up to the instant offense." In February 2025, the Monroe County Medical Examiner's Office announced that it planned to conduct an autopsy.

New York State Police arrested five suspects on February 9, 2025, and two additional suspects on February 20. The seven suspects charged were Precious Arzuaga, 38, Jennifer Quijano, 30, Kyle Sage, 33, Patrick Goodwin, 30, Emily Motyka, 19, Thomas G. Eaves, 21, and Kimberly Sochia, 29, all from New York State.

Prosecutors said the suspects all knew each other. "There are some romantic relationships. There are some family relationships. And there are some people that just knew each other from being around the area," said Assistant District Attorney Kelly Wolford. Arzuaga and Quijano had been in an on-again, off-again relationship for many years. Eaves is Arzuaga's son. Motyka lived with Eaves at his grandmother's apartment. Goodwin and Sochia lived together in the same motel as Arzuaga. Sage lived at a different nearby motel.

At least three of the suspects have criminal records. Goodwin (from Rochester, New York; born October 1994) was convicted of child sexual abuse in 2015 and released from prison in 2023. He was a registered sex offender and on parole when he was charged in this case. Sage (from Hopewell; born October 5, 1991) was on parole after being convicted of grand larceny and distributing pornography to a minor, finishing his prison sentence in May 2024. Arzuaga was previously convicted of misdemeanor trespass and larceny; in 2016, she was charged with animal cruelty to her dog, which was removed by authorities. For their alleged involvement in Nordquist's killing, the suspects were charged with second-degree murder with depraved indifference; on March 5, the murder charges were upgraded to first-degree murder. Arzuaga was also charged with coercing two children, aged 7 and 12, to take part in the torture.

Four defendants were charged with first-degree aggravated sexual abuse, and six were charged with concealment of a human corpse. All were charged with first-degree murder, first-degree kidnapping, second-degree conspiracy, and endangering the welfare of a child, as the prosecution stated a 7-year-old and a 12-year-old were forced to participate in the torture of Nordquist. Arzuaga was charged with coercing the children to do so. Assistant District Attorney Kelly Wolford said, "A hate crime would make this charge about Sam's gender or about Sam's race, and it's so much bigger. To limit us to a hate crime would be an injustice to Sam. Sam was beaten, assaulted, sexually abused, starved, held captive. And we cannot make sense of that. We cannot put that on his gender, and we cannot put that on his race."

Pre-trial hearings concluded on October 6, 2025.

On June 2, 2026, Emily Motyka pleaded guilty to second-degree murder and second-degree kidnapping. On June 26, 2026, Precious Arzuaga pleaded guilty to first-degree murder, kidnapping, aggravated sexual abuse, concealment of a human corpse, conspiracy, coercion, and endangering the welfare of a child. Arzuaga received no plea deal in exchange for her guilty plea and faced a sentence of life without parole. She was sentenced to life without parole in September 2026.

On July 15, 2026, Jennifer "Brooklyn" Quijano pleaded guilty to murder, two counts of kidnapping, conspiracy, aggravated sexual abuse, concealment of a human corpse, and two counts of endangering the welfare of a child. Quijano was sentenced to life without parole on September 8, 2026.

On August 14, 2026, Kyle Sage pleaded guilty to murder and kidnapping charges. He faces a possible sentence of 40 years to life in prison, with his sentencing scheduled for December 2, 2026.

== Aftermath ==
Vigils were held shortly after the discovery of Nordquist's death. One was hosted in his hometown of Red Wing, Minnesota, where he had attended high school. Another vigil was held that same day at Wood Library in Canandaigua, New York. The POCI Caucus and Queer Caucus of the Minnesota House of Representatives released a joint statement of solidarity and hosted a vigil at the Minnesota State Capitol. Organizers are looking into honoring Nordquist at an upcoming exhibit which showcases Minnesota's LGBTQ history.

The New York Times, in reporting Nordquist’s death, changed their headline twice, from originally referring to Nordquist as a transgender man and saying he was tortured for two months, then to simply referring to him as a man and saying he was tortured for "more than a month", and finally to simply referring to him as a person instead of a man or transgender man.

== Reactions ==
=== Individuals ===
On Bluesky, Minnesota governor Tim Walz called the events around Nordquist's killing "deeply disturbing", writing that "Minnesota stands with our LGBTQ neighbors against this unthinkable crime". New York Governor Kathy Hochul issued a statement on February 15, stating that her office would provide any support needed to secure justice for Nordquist and offering assistance to Nordquist's family. Three members of the Rochester City Council issued a joint statement that they "reaffirm our commitment to protecting Trans rights, ensuring safety for all and wish to make clear that you belong—fully, openly, and without fear."

In an interview with NewsNation affiliate WROC, Nordquist's mother, Linda Nordquist, said her son "would give you the shirt off his back" and that he was "very kind, loved his family, loved his nieces and nephew, very outgoing, worked hard". When asked about the five people initially arrested, she responded, "They can rot. They are scum, they are evil, I don’t know how somebody can be that evil." She later criticized law enforcement, claiming they failed to "do their jobs" when she called to request wellness checks.

=== Organizations ===
Transgender and LGBTQ advocates have questioned why prosecutors have not charged the suspects with hate crimes. LGBTQ groups such as GLAAD have called on the prosecutors to pursue hate crime charges.

Rochester LGBTQ+ Together, an advocacy group, reported that it was "angered and disgusted" to learn about Nordquist's killing. The New Pride Agenda, an LGBTQ rights organization based in New York, stated that they were "devastated and enraged by the horrific murder of Sam Nordquist" and that "this is not an isolated incident; it is a tragic consequence of the rising culture of hate in our society." The New York City Anti-Violence Project released a statement that regardless of whether law enforcement classified the case as a hate crime, anti-trans violence often intersects with racism, hate violence, and intimate partner violence.

GLAAD, the largest LGBTQ advocacy organization in the country, urged New York prosecutors to pursue hate crime charges. In a press release, they stated "While we are encouraged to see law enforcement act swiftly to investigate this horrific act, we caution investigators from ruling out hate crime charges," advising that "anti-LGBTQ hate can be perpetuated by anyone, regardless of their relationship to the victim or their own gender identity or sexual orientation."

== See also ==
- List of solved missing person cases (post-2000)

=== Similar crimes ===
- Murder of Gwen Araujo
- Murder of Gordon Church
- Murder of Billy Jack Gaither
- Murder of Brianna Ghey
- Murder of Anthony Milano
- Murder of Matthew Shepard
- Murder of Brandon Teena

=== Social context ===
- 2020s anti-LGBTQ movement in the United States
- Transgender genocide § United States
