= First Baptist Church of Phelps =

Historic church in New York, United States

- Phelps Baptist Church
- U.S. National Register of Historic Places
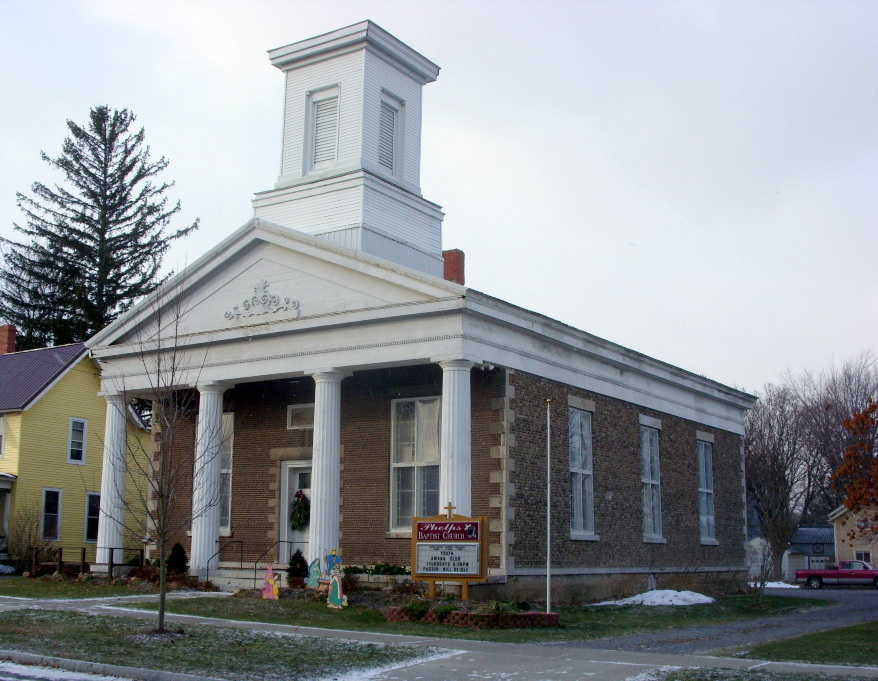
- Phelps Baptist Church, December 2008

- Location within New York Location within the United States
- Location: 40 Church St., Phelps, New York
- Coordinates: 42°57′18″N 77°3′31″W
- Area: less than one acre
- Built: 1845
- Architect: Skinner, John; Trumbull, Stephen
- Architectural style: Greek Revival
- MPS: Cobblestone Architecture of New York State MPS
- NRHP reference No.: 92000554
- Added to NRHP: May 22, 1992

Phelps Baptist Church is a historic Baptist church located at Phelps in Ontario County, New York, USA. The church was constructed in 1845 and is an example of Greek Revival style, cobblestone ecclesiastical architecture. It is a rectangular, gable roofed building built primarily of lake washed cobbles. It is among the approximately 101 cobblestone buildings in Ontario County and 26 in the village and town of Phelps.

It was listed on the National Register of Historic Places in 1992.
