= Pageant of Steam =

Annual steam fair in New York, United States

Coordinates: 42°52′09″N 77°11′38″W

Pageant of Steam is an annual steam fair held on Gehan Road near Canandaigua, New York (Town of Hopewell) between Rochester and Syracuse. It started in 1960 and is hosted by the New York Steam Engine Association.

The pageant is held the second full weekend of August, starting on Wednesday and continuing through Saturday. Besides steam engines, it features an antique tractor pull and a large flea market. Due to the nearby Empire Farm Days event that was in various Upstate New York locations including nearby Seneca Falls and Pompey, held from Tuesday until Thursday, some of the flea market vendors and many visitors attend the Steam Pageant on Friday and Saturday. As of 2023 Empire Farm Days is a week before the Steam Pageant.

Until 1971, when 28 acres (110,000 m^{2}) were purchased on Gehan Road off State Route 5 and US 20 3 miles (4.8 km) East of the City of Canandaigua, the event was held at various places, including the old site of Roseland Waterpark on Canandaigua Lake.
