= Red Wing High School =

Coordinates: 44.5351°N 92.5153°W

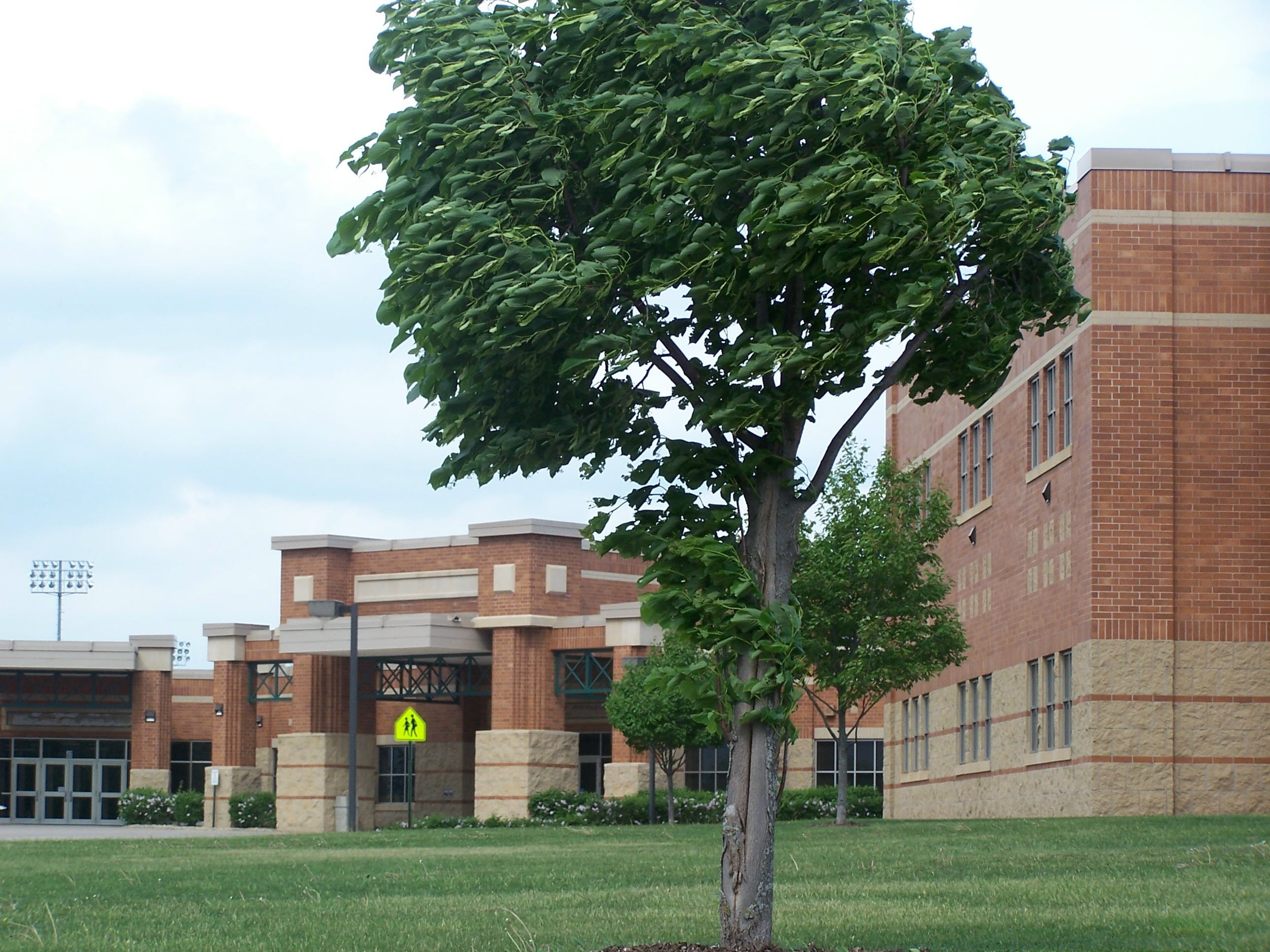

Location
- 2451 Eagle Ridge Drive; Red Wing, Minnesota 55066; United States

Information
- School type: Public
- Founded: 1886
- Superintendent: Martina Wagner
- Principal: Joshua Fuchs
- Grades: 8–12
- Enrollment: 820 (2023-2024)
- Area: Goodhue County
- Colors: Purple and white
- Song: "Illinois Loyalty"
- Mascot: Winger Bird
- Team name: Red Wing Wingers
- Newspaper: Aerie
- Yearbook: Scarlett Feather
- Website: www.redwing.k12.mn.us/our-schools/red-wing-high-school/

Red Wing High School is a liberal arts, public high school located in the Mississippi River Valley, 50 miles southeast of the Minneapolis/St. Paul metropolitan area, in the United States. The school is part of the Red Wing Independent School District (ISD 256) and serves as the high school for Red Wing, Minnesota, and its surrounding communities.

== History ==
The school has a history dating back to 1886, the year that Red Wing built its first public high school.

=== Central High School (1919–1995) ===
Constructed in 1919, the historic Central High, located on East Avenue, functioned as a school. In 1995 the city of Red Wing built the new Red Wing High School on the southeast side of town.

=== Red Wing High School (1995–present) ===
The building opened on September 5, 1995, and was located on 222 acres (0.90 km^{2}) of rolling hills on the southeast edge of town. From 1995 to 2010, Red Wing High School served grades 9–12, with 8th grade housed at Twin Bluff Middle School. Due to increased enrollment in younger grades and space needs within the district, in the fall of 2010, the 8th grade was moved to the high school. The building now serves students in grades 8–12.

Features include flexible team learning areas, a multi-station "food court," and common staff planning areas. A full size greenhouse and one-of-a-kind Minnesota Department of Natural Resources-licensed Aquaculture Facility host plant science and agricultural courses. The Hovda Auditorium seats 732 people and supports concerts and community events. The Little Theatre allows seating for 250 and hosts smaller productions.

The top load gymnasium offers three teaching stations. The weight room is available for physical education instruction and sports training. The sports complex includes a football stadium, eight tennis courts, three baseball fields, four softball fields, soccer fields, a nine-lane all-weather running track, and field event areas. The district also owns an indoor ice skating facility, Prairie Island Arena.

=== Academic assessment ===
The Basic Skills Tests (BST) have been replaced by the Minnesota Comprehensive Assessments (MCA-IIs) in a continued effort to develop a more rigorous K-12 education system. The MCA-IIs were created to help schools and districts measure student progress in mastering the state's new reading, writing and mathematics standards.

==== Assessment results ====
2010 Minnesota Comprehensive Assessment Series II scores:

- 63% of students met or exceeded state standards for Science – 12% higher than the state average.
- 81% of students met or exceeded state standards for Reading – 6% higher than the state average.
- 39% of students met or exceeded state standards for Math.

== College preparation ==
RWHS offers a variety of Advanced Placement (AP), College in the Schools (CIS), liberal arts, and Career and Technical Education programs.

=== College in the Schools ===
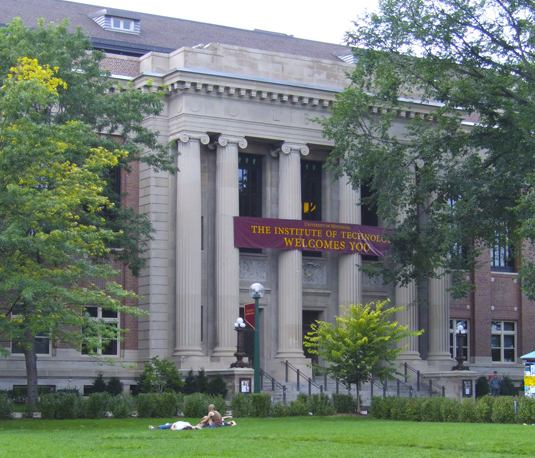
University of Minnesota – Twin Cities

College in the Schools is a program run by the University of Minnesota that allows high school students to earn college credit while staying in their high school. Columbia University found that students who took dual enrollment courses in high school were more likely to graduate from high school and enroll in college, as well as three years after high school graduation, students who had participated in dual enrollment courses in high school had earned higher college GPAs and more postsecondary credits than their peers.

Research shows that colleges and universities nationwide accept dual enrollment credits at almost the same rate as they accept AP scores, though it greatly depends on the institution from which the credit originated from. College in the Schools dual enrollment through the University of Minnesota is accepted almost universally coast-to-coast.

Once limited to high-achieving students, such programs, specifically College in the Schools, are increasingly seen as a means to support the postsecondary preparation of average-achieving students. CIS simulates a truer college experience, as unlike AP courses, students are already enrolled in a college institution and need only to earn a quality grade throughout the course, rather than the potential for college credit being based solely on the score of a cumulative final exam. The United States Department of Education recommends expanding accelerated learning options that offer true post-secondary course work so that students enter higher education with a minimum of six college credits already earned, as students who fail to earn 20 college credits by the end of their first year were less likely to graduate from college.

There is no charge to high school students attending U of M courses offered by CIS at their high school. The University of Minnesota-TC charges schools or districts tuition based on a per student, per course basis (not per credit). For the 2010–2011 school year, tuition is $145 per student, per course, and partial reimbursement for these costs is available to public high schools from the state. College in the Schools is significantly less expensive than the full tuition rate the school district or parent pays when a student enrolls full-time PSEO or after graduation.

The University of Minnesota offers over thirty courses through their CIS program, including University Writing, Calculus, American History, Economics, Physiology and several courses in the content areas of World Language and Agricultural Science. College in the School courses offered at RWHS are CIS German and CIS Spanish.

=== Advanced Placement ===
Advanced Placement courses are college-level courses taught at RWHS. The Advanced Placement curriculum is offered through a grant earned by Red Wing High School. AP offerings at RWHS include AP Biology, AP Chemistry, AP Language & Composition, AP Literature & Composition, AP Calculus, AP Microeconomics, AP Human Geography, AP Art History and AP Studio Art Drawing.

=== Post-secondary enrollment pptions ===
Eligible juniors and seniors at Red Wing High School may enroll at Minnesota post-secondary institutions on a full or part-time basis. A student who takes college or technical courses for high school credit will have the cost of tuition, books and materials paid for by the State of Minnesota. Enrollment options include, but are not limited to: Minnesota State College – Southeast Technical, University Center Rochester (featuring programs from Rochester Community & Technical College (RCTC), University of Minnesota – Rochester and WSU Rochester Center) and the University of Minnesota – Twin Cities.

=== Articulated Agreements (Tech Prep) ===
Articulated Agreements are contractual agreements between Red Wing High School and selected post-secondary schools in Minnesota that will provide curricula allowing advanced standing for students in post-secondary technical programs. At Red Wing High School, a junior or senior student earning an "A" or "B" in an Articulated course will receive a certificate indicating the number of credits that will be honored by the technical or community college named on the certificate. Articulated Agreement credits may be earned at Red Wing High School in Agricultural Science, Business and Marketing, Family and Consumer Science and Industrial Technology.

== Athletics, co-curricular activities and performing arts ==
Red Wing High School hockey team

Red Wing competes in the Missota Conference and Region IAA of the Minnesota State High School League. The sports teams are known as the Red Wing Wingers. The school colors are purple and white. Uniforms and school logos typically include red as an accent. Many students recognize purple, red and white as the school colors, but red is only included due to the name of the city.

The school's hockey program was started in 1974 by Jim Pohl. Led by John Pohl, the Wingers won the boys' state championship in 1997. John Pohl is second place for the all-time scoring record for Minnesota high school hockey.

=== Sports and activities ===
Athletics at Red Wing High School
Fall		Winter		Spring	
Sport	State championships	Sport	State championships	Sport	State championships
Cheerleading		Boys' basketball	1915, 1920, 1922, 1933	Boys' baseball	
Boys' cross country		Girls' basketball		Boys' golf	1962
Girls' cross country		Cheerleading		Girls' golf	2001, 2002, 2003, 2011
Football		Girls' gymnastics		Girls' softball	
Boys' soccer		Boys' hockey	1997	Boys' tennis	
Girls' soccer		Girls' hockey		Boys' track and field	
Girls' swimming and diving	2000, 2001, 2002	Boys' swimming and diving	1998	Girls' track and field	
Girls' tennis					
Volleyball					
Total state championships: 12

=== Activities and co-curricular organizations ===
==== Student body and support groups ====
Red Wing High School celebrates Homecoming 2009 with sleeping bag races, hosted by Student Council.

- Student council

==== Co-curricular and intra-curricular organizations ====
Student leaders welcome elementary students to the FFA chapter's Earth Day event, where first-grade students learn about the environment, conservation and agriculture.

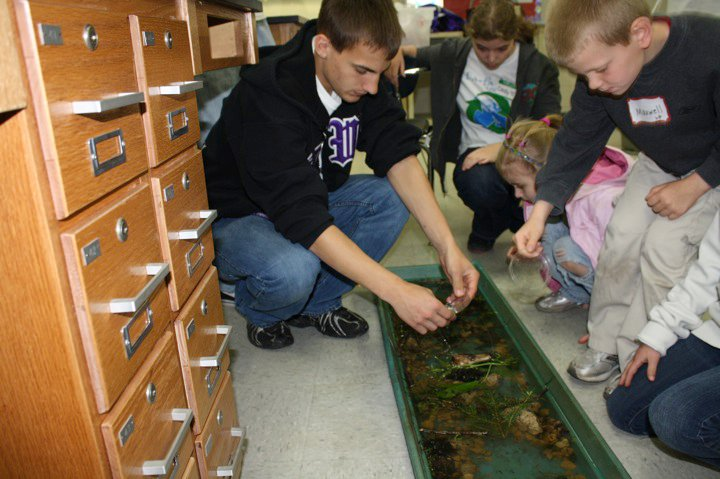
Students teach environmental science and agriculture during Earth Day.

- DECA
- FFA organizes many events at Red Wing High School, including Earth Day, Open House, Poverty Night, and the school wide Day of Caring and Sharing.
- Health Occupations Students of America (HOSA)
- SkillsUSA

==== Academic and recognition activities ====
- The Aerie is the Red Wing High School newspaper, which prints roughly 14 issues per school year in the Republican Eagle.
- Knowledge Bowl is an interdisciplinary academic competition involving teams of four to six students trying to answer questions in a written round and several oral rounds.
- Speech Competition
- The Scarlet Feather is responsible for recording, highlighting and commemorating the past year of school in the annual yearbook.
- National Honor Society
- S.O.A.R. (Success, Opportunity, Achievement and Recognition) aims for every Red Wing student to have the opportunity for a successful high school career, and for every student to be recognized for their achievements.

==== Service organizations ====
- Interact is a combination service and social club for young people ages 14 to 18. Each of the over 7,200 Interact clubs around the world is sponsored by a Rotary Club that provides guidance and inspiration. The youth clubs are self-governing and self-supporting, giving Interactors a chance to develop a range of leadership skills while learning the value of good teamwork. Interact stands for "international action"; Interact clubs exist in 88 countries and 17 geographical areas.
- Key Club is a year-round service organization, which is sponsored by the local Kiwanis Clubs composed of the leading business and professional people to the community. Key Club's objective is the development of initiative, leadership ability and good citizenship practices.

==== Performing arts ====
Red Wing High School Marching Band

- Marching Band and Jazz Band
- Ovation is a co-curricular ensemble of 16 students selected from Concert Choir.
- Every year Red Wing High School and the Sheldon Theater produce a professional, big-budget musical. The performances occur in the Sheldon Theater, and the stage and costumes are professionally designed.
- Drama/Theatre at Red Wing typically stages three productions each year:
  - Fall play: usually a children's play
  - Winter play: usually a three-act comedy or classic presented in February or March
  - One-Act: Minnesota State High School League one-act play competition

== Notable alumni ==
- Ryan Boldt, second round pick in the 2016 MLB draft by the Tampa Bay Rays
- Reid Cashman, AHL player, Toronto Marlies, Wilkes-Barre/Scranton Penguins
- Patrick John Flueger, actor, The Princess Diaries, The 4400, Scoundrels the 2011 remake of the film Footloose, and the NBC series Chicago P.D.
- Taylor Heise, US Women's Hockey Olympic Gold Medalist
- Tim Kelly, politician, Minnesota House of Representatives
- Vic Kulbitski, American football player
- Lyle Mehrkens, Minnesota state legislator and farmer
- Sam Nordquist, group home worker
- Lauris Norstad, Air Force general, commander of NATO forces
- Mitchell Peters, percussionist, composer and long-time tympanist with the Los Angeles Philharmonic Orchestra
- John Pohl, NHL player, Toronto Maple Leafs, Chicago Wolves
- James Touchi-Peters, composer, symphonic conductor, and jazz vocalist
