= New York State Route 21 =

New York state highway

New York State Route 21
- Map of western New York with NY 21 highlighted in red

Route information
- Maintained by NYSDOT and the village of Palmyra
- Length: 99.99 mi (160.92 km)
- Existed: 1930–present

Major junctions
- South end: NY 417 in Andover
- I-86 / NY 17 in Almond; I-390 / NY 15 in Wayland; US 20 / NY 5 in Canandaigua; I-90 Toll / New York Thruway / NY 96 in Manchester
- North end: NY 104 in Williamson

Location
- Country: United States
- State: New York
- Counties: Allegany, Steuben, Ontario, Yates, Wayne

Highway system
- New York Highways; Interstate; US; State; Reference; Parkways
← NY 20SY	→ NY 21A

New York State Route 21 (NY 21) is a state highway extending for about one hundred miles (160.9 km) through the western part of New York in the United States. The southern terminus of the route is at an intersection with NY 417 in the village of Andover, and its northern terminus is at a junction with NY 104 in the town of Williamson. In between, NY 21 serves the cities of Hornell and Canandaigua and intersects several major east–west routes, including the Southern Tier Expressway (I-86/NY 17) near Hornell, the conjoined routes of U.S. Route 20 (US 20) and NY 5 in Canandaigua, the New York State Thruway (I-90) in Manchester, and NY 31 in Palmyra.

NY 21 originally extended from the Pennsylvania state line in the south to Lake Ontario in the north when it was assigned as part of the 1930 renumbering of state highways in New York. South of Hornell, the route followed modern NY 36. NY 21 was rerouted to follow its current alignment south of Hornell in the 1950s and truncated on its northern end to Williamson in 1980. Other changes of local importance, mostly realignments to bypass communities along the route, have also occurred at various points in the route's history. NY 21 originally had an alternate route around Canandaigua Lake; however, that highway—designated NY 21A—was eliminated in the 1940s.

== Route description ==
=== Andover to Naples ===
NY 21 begins at an intersection with NY 417 in the village of Andover. The route heads northward, paralleling the Western New York and Pennsylvania Railroad (WNYP) through a rural stretch of eastern Allegany County. At Alfred Station, located just east of the village of Alfred, the highway meets the eastern terminus of NY 244. NY 21 and the WNYP head northeast through the village of Almond to the Steuben County line, where the road and rail line begin to turn to the southeast toward Hornell. The portion of NY 21 near Almond briefly parallels the Southern Tier Expressway, designated Interstate 86 (I-86) and NY 17. East of the county line, NY 21 leaves the vicinity of the expressway and passes through another undeveloped stretch to reach the city of Hornell, where it becomes West Main Street.

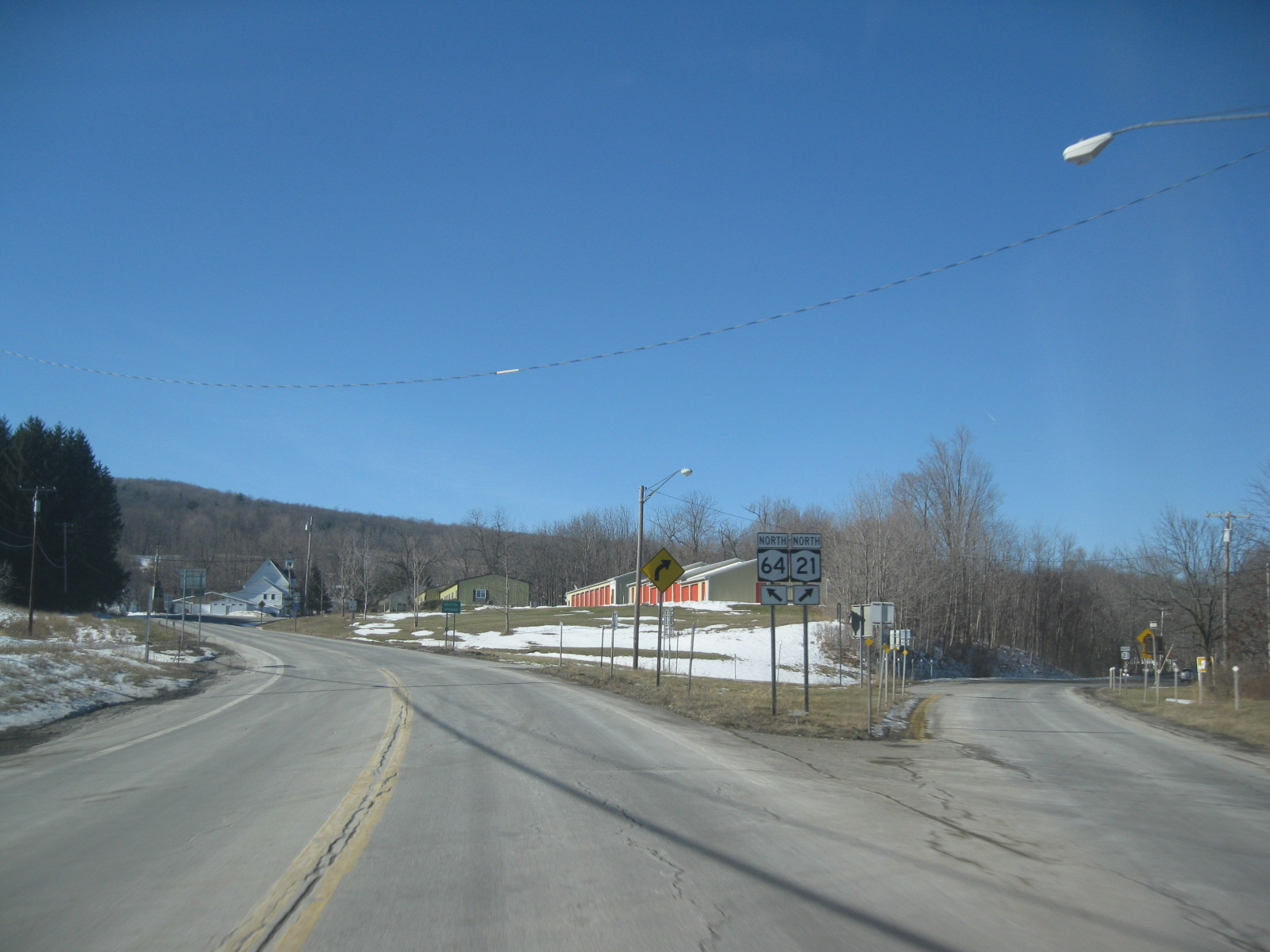
Northbound at the fork between NY 21 and NY 64 in South Bristol

The highway follows West Main Street for several blocks into the city's downtown district, where it crosses the Norfolk Southern Railway's Southern Tier Line and intersects NY 36. NY 21 turns north onto NY 36, separating from the WNYP and forming a concurrency with NY 36 north along a four-lane divided highway known as the Maple City Bypass. The overlap ends north of the city limits in the town of Hornellsville, where NY 21 splits from NY 36 and resumes its northeasterly track. Not far to the north of this point is exit 34 of the Southern Tier Expressway, accessed by way of NY 36. From Hornell, NY 21 heads northeast through progressively less developed areas as it winds its way across the hilly terrain of the Southern Tier. For the next 15 miles (24 km), NY 21 serves only small, roadside hamlets, such as Fremont, Haskinville, and Loon Lake.

North of Haskinville, NY 21 takes on a more northerly course through the county that eventually brings it to the village of Wayland, where it intersects I-390 at exit 3 south of the village. The interchange also serves as the southern terminus of NY 15 and is adjacent to the north end of NY 415, which terminates north of the exit at NY 21. NY 15 joins NY 21 north into the center of Wayland, where the two routes separate upon intersecting NY 63. While NY 15 continues north from the village into Livingston County, NY 21 leaves Wayland on an east–west alignment, roughly paralleling the northern county line and a B&H Rail Corporation line as it runs through a valley surrounding the Cohocton River. After 6 miles (9.7 km), the road enters the hamlet of North Cohocton, centered around NY 21's junction with the northern terminus of NY 371.

While the river, its valley, and the rail line proceed south from North Cohocton, NY 21 turns to the northeast, ascending out of the valley and finally crossing the county line, at this point bordering Ontario County. The route meanders across another area of hilly, undeveloped terrain to the village of Naples, home to the north end of NY 53 and the south end of NY 245. NY 21 meets the two routes at opposite ends of the community, with NY 53 terminating south of the village center and NY 245 beginning to its north. Naples also serves as NY 21's entrance to the Finger Lakes region; the village itself is located in the southernmost part of the Canandaigua Lake valley.

=== Naples to Williamson ===
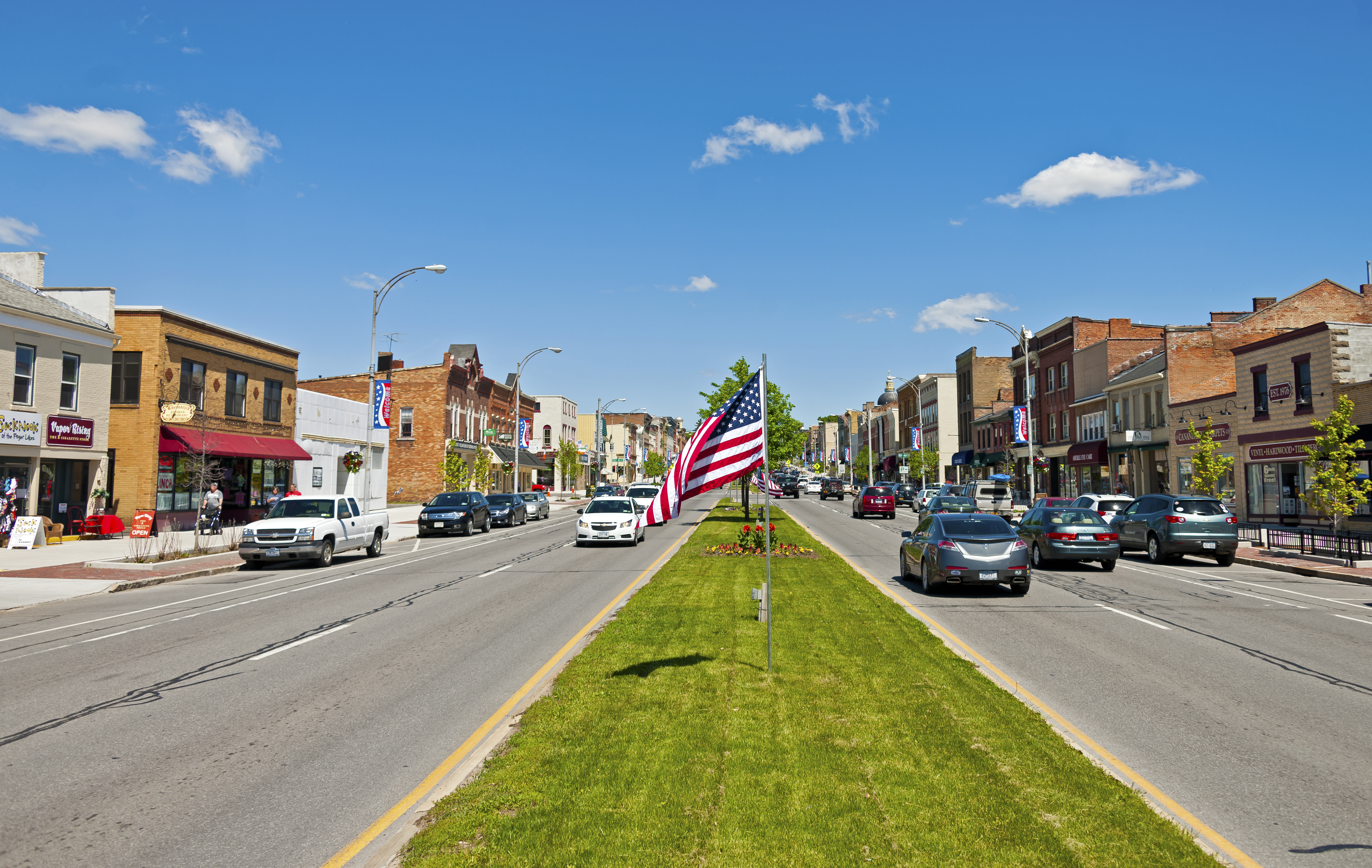
Main Street in Canandaigua

NY 21 continues north from Naples, running alongside the western edge of the lake valley, and eventually the lake itself. Near Woodville, a hamlet 3 miles (4.8 km) north of Naples, the route briefly enters Yates County for just over a half-mile (0.8 km) before reentering Ontario County. It serves lakeside homes and cottages in the town of South Bristol for another 2 miles (3.2 km), after which the road begins to climb the side of the valley and meander toward the hamlet of Bristol Springs. Here, the road forks, with NY 64 beginning to the left (west) and NY 21 continuing to the right (north). While NY 64 heads northwest to Rochester, NY 21 progresses to the northeast, overlooking Canandaigua Lake on its way through mostly isolated areas of the town of Canandaigua. The route eventually reaches the outskirts of the city of Canandaigua, where it intersects US 20 and NY 5.

At this point, NY 21 turns east, joining US 20 and NY 5 as all three routes head around the southwestern portion of the city. The primary portion of the bypass ends about 1.5 miles (2.4 km) later at an intersection with South Main Street; the junction also marks the east end of the overlap between the three routes and the south end of NY 332. NY 21 turns north onto South Main Street, following NY 332 through the city's historic downtown district. The two routes pass by 426 South Main Street, Benham House, and the city's former United States Post Office, all properties listed on the National Register of Historic Places, before splitting at the junction of Gibson and North Main streets. NY 332 continues north from this point on North Main Street toward Victor while NY 21 follows Gibson Street northeastward through a residential section of the city. It passes Sonnenberg Gardens and Mansion State Historic Park and the city's VA Hospital before leaving the Canandaigua city limits.

Outside the Canandaigua city limits, the area surrounding NY 21 becomes rural once again; however, the surrounding terrain is more level than it was south of the city. The route heads northeast through farmland to Chapin, a small hamlet in the town of Hopewell, where it intersects the south end of NY 488 and turns to take on a more northerly course. Not far to the north are the adjacent villages of Shortsville and Manchester, roughly separated by the Ontario Central Railroad. Here, NY 21 passes under the railroad and intersects both NY 96 and the New York State Thruway (I-90) at exit 43 just north of the Manchester village center. Past the Thruway, NY 21 becomes rural in nature once more as it runs across rolling terrain to the Wayne County line.

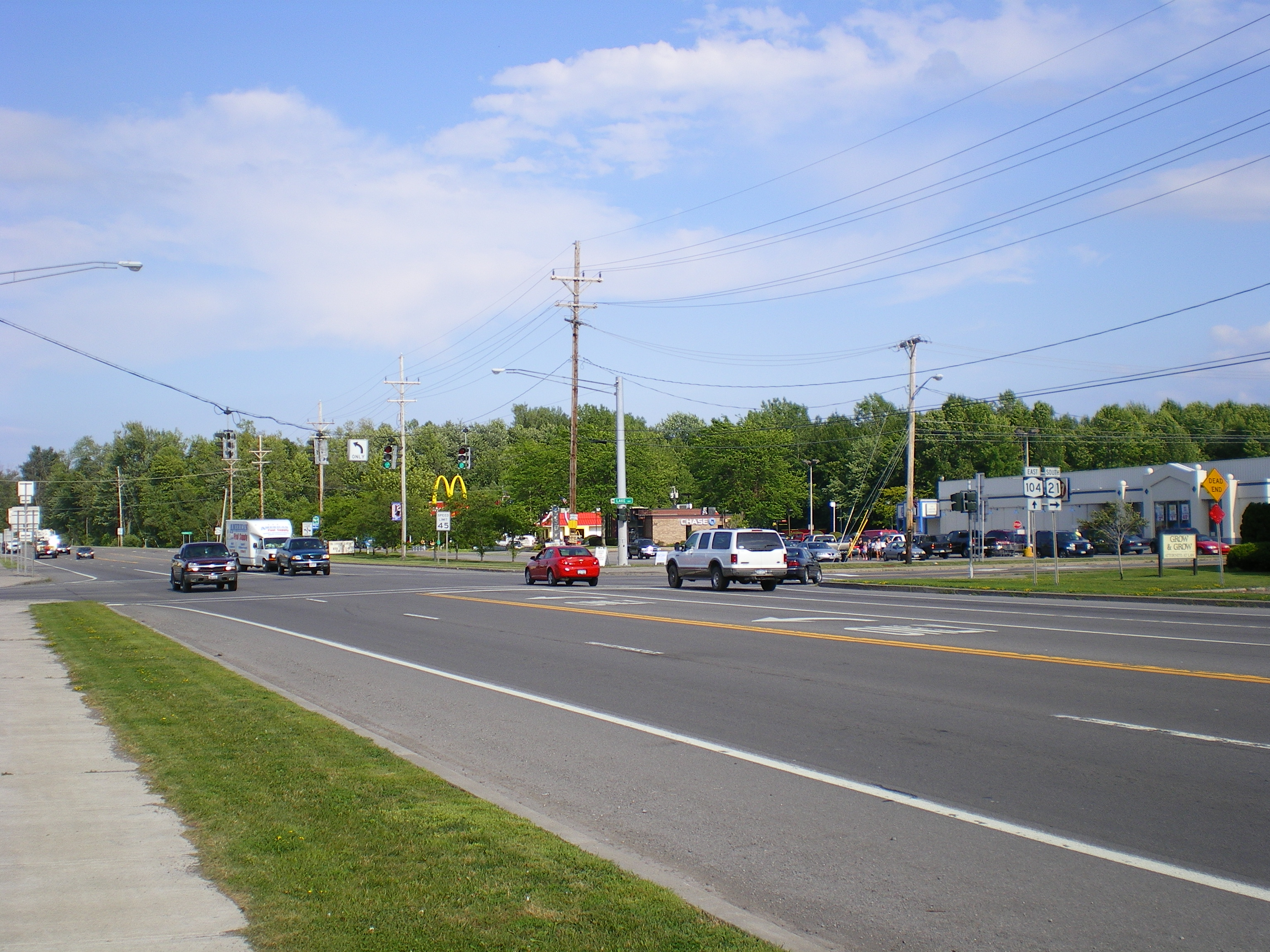
Northern terminus of NY 21 at NY 104 in Williamson

Within Wayne County, the area around NY 21 becomes more developed as it enters the village of Palmyra, where the road is village-maintained from the southern village line to its junction with NY 31 in the village's historic center. The route briefly overlaps NY 31 along East Main Street before crossing both the Erie Canal and the CSX Transportation-owned Rochester Subdivision on its way out of the village. From Palmyra to Williamson, the land surrounding NY 21 is predominantly rural in nature. However, midway between the two locations, NY 21 comes close to the town of Marion, which it bypasses to the west. Due to this bypass Marion receives much less traffic, and businesses are left to rot, similarly to Radiator Springs in the movie Cars. In Williamson, NY 21 passes through the town center at a junction with Ridge Road before ending at an intersection with NY 104 in a more commercial section of the town.

== History ==
=== Origins ===
Prior to the American Revolution, the path of modern NY 21 north of Canandaigua was part of an old Native American trail connecting Seneca Lake to Lake Ontario by way of Canandaigua Lake. The trail began in the vicinity of Geneva and went west to Canandaigua on a path now occupied by US 20 and NY 5. It continued north from Canandaigua, passing through the village of Palmyra and the hamlet of Marion before reaching the Lake Ontario shoreline at Pultneyville. Construction to convert the Canandaigua–Marion section of the trail into a road was completed in 1794. The remainder of the trail north to Pultneyville was converted into a road approximately three years later.

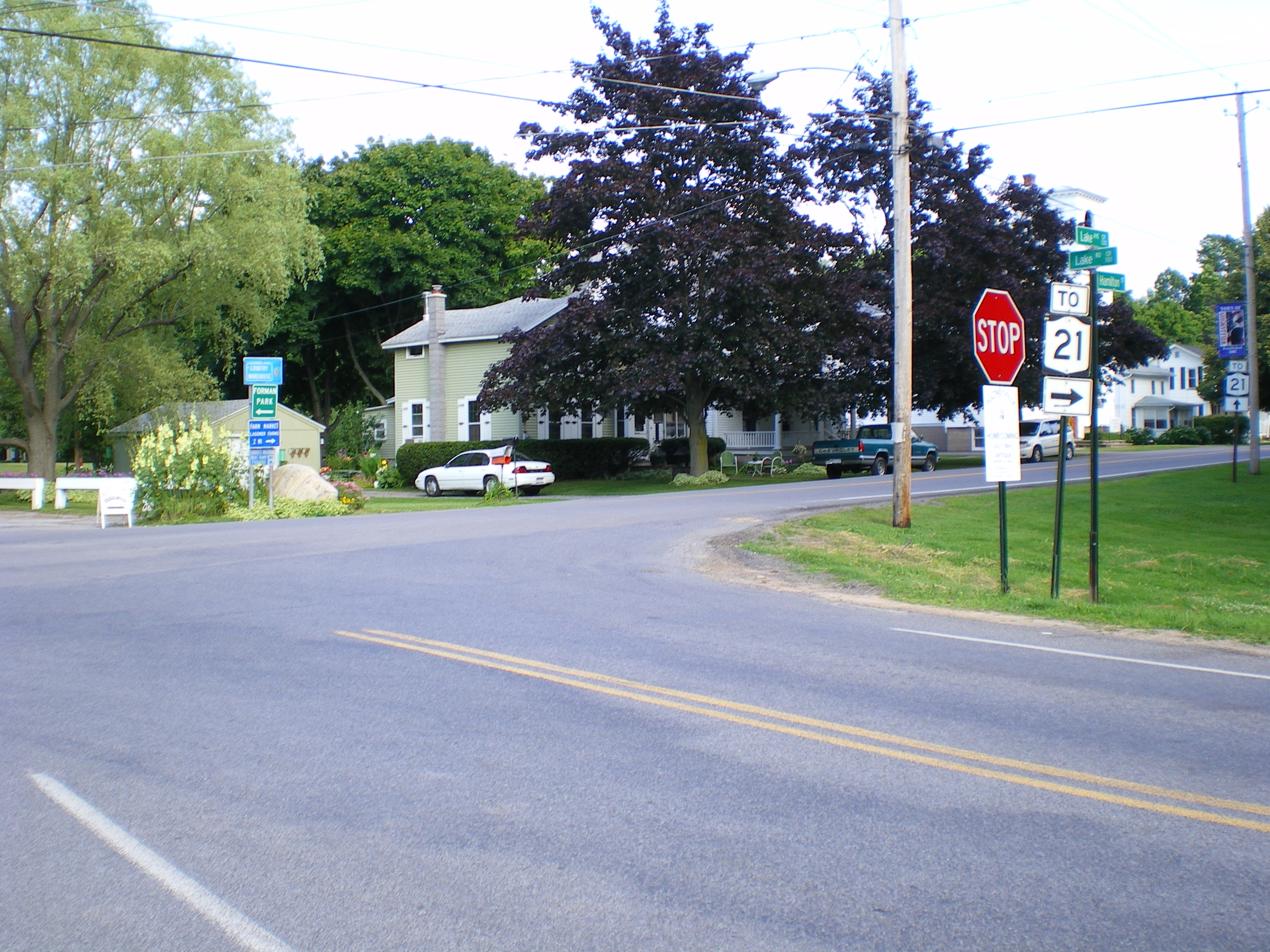
The junction of Lake Road and Hamilton Street in Pultneyville, which was NY 21's northern terminus from 1930 to 1980

The Canandaigua–Pultneyville highway served as a post road in the years that followed. At some point, the section of the highway between Palmyra and Marion, initially a corduroy road, was rebuilt as a plank road and tolled. The highway fell into disrepair over the years, leading travelers to conceive ways to avoid paying toll. The toll booths were eventually removed, and the road was later covered with dirt and converted into a stage road. By the 1920s, the state of New York had assumed ownership of the Canandaigua–Pultneyville highway. In the mid-1920s, it became part of NY 72, a north–south highway extending from NY 52 in Naples to the Lake Ontario shoreline in Pultneyville by way of the western side of Canandaigua Lake.

=== Establishment ===
In the 1930 renumbering of state highways in New York, NY 72 became part of NY 21, a new route extending from the Pennsylvania state line at Troupsburg to Pultneyville. It followed what is now NY 36 from the state line to Hornell and modern County Route 121 (CR 121), NY 415, and NY 371 between Loon Lake and North Cohocton (via Cohocton). The remainder of NY 21 roughly followed its current alignment. At the same time, what is now NY 21 from Andover to Hornell was designated as the western half of NY 17F while the section between Loon Lake and modern NY 415 was assigned NY 371. The remaining piece around Wayland was part of NY 2 south of Wayland and part of the new NY 39 from Wayland to Cohocton. NY 39 overlapped NY 21 from Cohocton to Naples, where it forked from NY 21 and continued east on modern NY 245.

Several portions of current NY 21 south of Naples had carried designations prior to 1930. In 1924, the Andover–Hornell segment was designated as part of NY 17; at the same time, the short piece between modern NY 415 and the center of Wayland became part of NY 4. By 1926, the portion connecting Wayland to Naples was included in the new NY 52. NY 4 was renumbered to NY 2 in 1927 to eliminate numerical duplication with the new US 4.

=== Realignments and truncations ===
The alignments of NY 21 and NY 371 between Loon Lake and Cohocton were flipped c. 1937, routing NY 21 through the village of Wayland instead. The realignment extended NY 21's overlap with NY 39 west to Wayland and created an overlap with NY 2 south of the village. NY 2 was absorbed into an extended US 15 (now NY 15) by the following year. In the early 1940s, the NY 17F designation was eliminated and replaced with an extended NY 36 from Andover to Hornell. The alignments of NY 36 and NY 21 south of Hornell were flipped in the early 1950s, placing both routes on their current alignments south of the city.

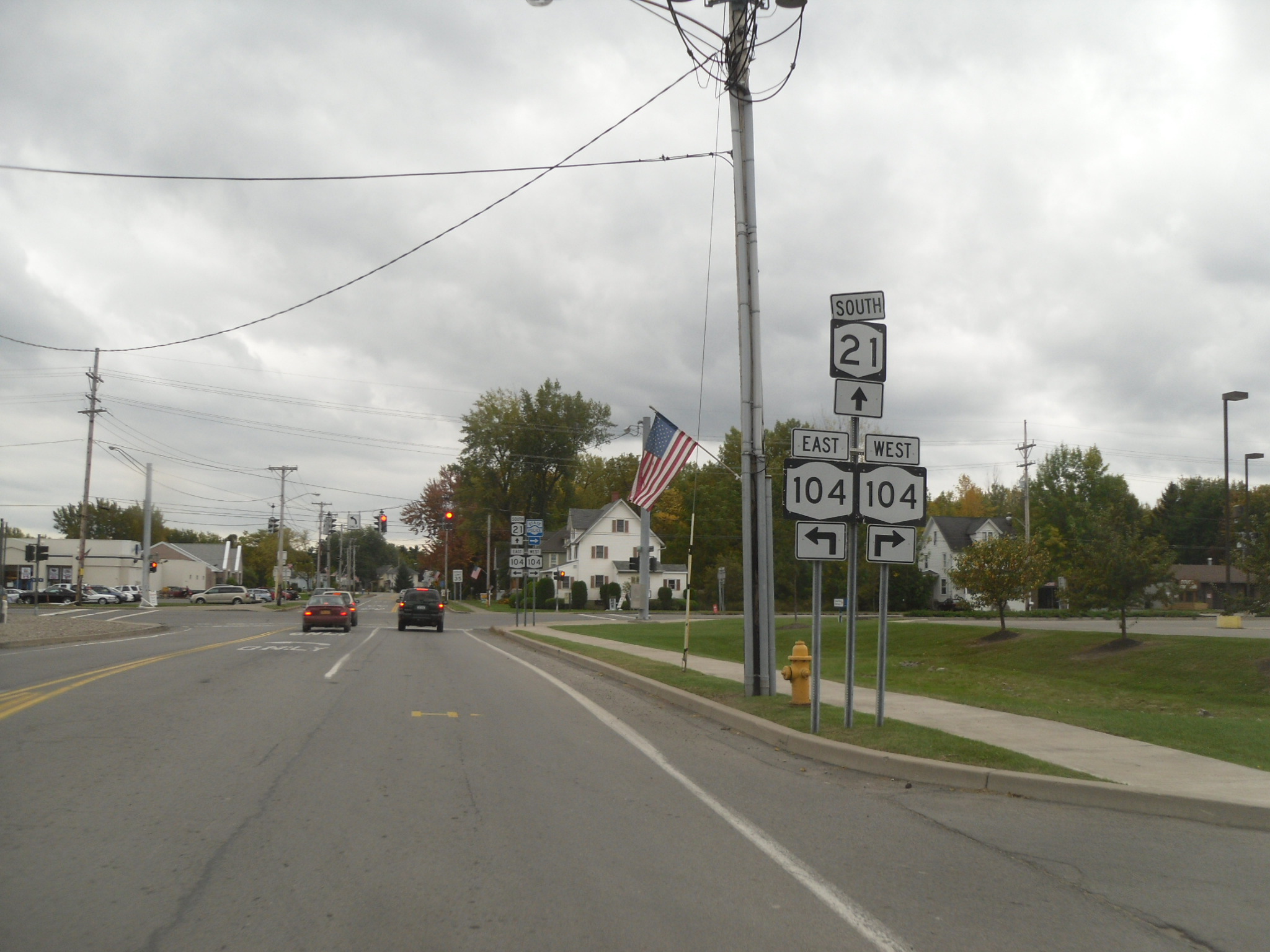
Lake Avenue (former NY 21) southbound at NY 21's current northern terminus in Williamson

On April 1, 1980, NY 21 was truncated to its present northern terminus at NY 104 in Williamson as part of a highway maintenance swap between New York State and Wayne County. In the swap, ownership and maintenance of NY 21 north of Williamson was transferred from the state of New York to the county in exchange for maintenance of NY 441 between the Monroe–Wayne county line and NY 350. The former routing of NY 21 north to Lake Road (CR 101) in Pultneyville is now designated as CR 120.

Until the 1980s, NY 21 entered Canandaigua on Bristol Street and followed it to South Main Street (then-US 20 and NY 5), where it joined its current alignment. When the Western Bypass around the southwestern fringe of the city was constructed in the late 1970s and early 1980s, US 20 and NY 5 were realigned to follow the highway around the city. NY 21 was also realigned at this time to follow its modern routing on the bypass and South Main Street. The segment of Bristol Street vacated by NY 21 between the Western Bypass and the Canandaigua city line was maintained by the New York State Department of Transportation (NYSDOT) as unsigned NY 943A until September 1, 1996, when maintenance of the road was turned over to the town of Canandaigua. However, the designation remained in NYSDOT documents until 2007.

== NY 21A ==
New York State Route 21A
- Location: Naples–Canandaigua
- Existed: 1930–early 1940s

NY 21A was an alternate route of NY 21 along the eastern side of Canandaigua Lake. When it was assigned as part of the 1930 renumbering of state highways in New York, it began at NY 21 north of the village of Naples and ran along the east shore of the lake to eastern Canandaigua, where it ended at US 20 and NY 5. In between, NY 21A passed through the lakeside hamlet of Vine Valley. The route was truncated c. 1939 to begin in Vine Valley, separating it from its parent route. It was eliminated entirely in the early 1940s when most of NY 21A was absorbed by NY 364.

== Major intersections ==
County	Location	mi	km	Destinations	Notes
Allegany	Village of Andover	0.00	0.00	NY 417 – Greenwood, Wellsville	Southern terminus
Allegany	Town of Alfred	8.50	13.68	Hamilton Hill Road (NY 961G west) – Alfred Station, Alfred, Belmont	
Allegany	Town of Alfred	8.80	14.16	NY 244 west – Alfred Station, Alfred	Hamlet of Alfred Station; eastern terminus of NY 244
Allegany	Village of Almond	12.78	20.57	To I-86 / NY 17 – Jamestown, Binghamton	Access via NY 962A
Steuben	Hornell	17.45	28.08	NY 36 south (Maple City Drive) – Canisteo	Southern terminus of NY 21 / NY 36 overlap
Steuben	Hornellsville	19.97	32.14	NY 36 north to I-86 / NY 17 – Arkport, Kanakadea Park	Northern terminus of NY 21 / NY 36 overlap
Steuben	Town of Wayland	36.89	59.37	I-390 / NY 15 north – Rochester, Dansville, Corning	Exit 3 on I-390; southern terminus of NY 15; southern terminus of NY 15 / NY 21 overlap
Steuben	Town of Wayland	37.05	59.63	NY 415 south	Northern terminus of NY 415
Steuben	Village of Wayland	38.75	62.36	NY 15 north – Rochester NY 63 north – Dansville	Northern terminus of NY 15 / NY 21 overlap; southern terminus of NY 63
Steuben	Town of Cohocton	45.52	73.26	NY 371 south – Cohocton	Hamlet of North Cohocton; northern terminus of NY 371
Ontario	Village of Naples	50.04	80.53	NY 53 south	Northern terminus of NY 53
Ontario	Village of Naples	51.50	82.88	NY 245 north	Southern terminus of NY 245
Ontario	South Bristol	57.68	92.83	NY 64 north	Hamlet of Bristol Springs; southern terminus of NY 64
Ontario	Town of Canandaigua	70.81	113.96	US 20 west / NY 5 west	Western terminus of US 20 / NY 5 / NY 21 overlap
Ontario	City of Canandaigua	72.44	116.58	US 20 east / NY 5 east / NY 332 north – Geneva	Eastern terminus of US 20 / NY 5 / NY 21 overlap; southern terminus of NY 21 / NY 332 overlap; southern terminus of NY 332
Ontario	City of Canandaigua	72.44	116.58	South Main Street ( NY 942T south)	Former routing of US 20/NY 5
Ontario	City of Canandaigua	73.39	118.11	NY 332 north to I-90	Northern terminus of NY 21 / NY 332 overlap
Ontario	Hopewell	76.61	123.29	NY 488 north	Hamlet of Chapin; southern terminus of NY 488
Ontario	Village of Manchester	80.59	129.70	NY 96 – Clifton Springs, Phelps	
Ontario	Village of Manchester	80.87	130.15	I-90 Toll / New York Thruway – Buffalo, Albany	Exit 43 on I-90 / Thruway
Wayne	Village of Palmyra	86.87	139.80	NY 31 west – Rochester	Western terminus of NY 21 / NY 31 overlap
Wayne	Village of Palmyra	87.49	140.80	NY 31 east – Newark	Eastern terminus of NY 21 / NY 31 overlap
Wayne	Williamson	99.99	160.92	NY 104 – Rochester, Sodus	Northern terminus; hamlet of Williamson
1.000 mi = 1.609 km; 1.000 km = 0.621 mi: Concurrency terminus; Electronic toll collection

== See also ==
- List of county routes in Wayne County, New York
