= Hopewell, New York =

- Town
- Location within the state of New York
- Coordinates: 42°53′37″N 77°11′46″W
- Country: United States
- State: New York
- County: Ontario

Government
  - Type: Town Council
  - Town Supervisor: Bill Namestnik (R)
  - Town Council: Mark Curran Andrew Faust Jeff Trickey Adam Sanford

Area
  - Total: 35.70 sq mi (92.45 km^{2})
  - Land: 35.68 sq mi (92.40 km^{2})
  - Water: 0.019 sq mi (0.05 km^{2})
- Elevation: 833 ft (254 m)

Population (2020)
  - Total: 3,931
  - Estimate (2022): 3,921
  - Density: 110.2/sq mi (42.54/km^{2})
- Time zone: UTC-5 (Eastern (EST))
  - Summer (DST): UTC-4 (EDT)
- FIPS code: 36-35551
- GNIS feature ID: 0979074
- Website: https://townofhopewellny.gov/

Hopewell is a town in Ontario County, New York, United States. The population was 3,931 at the 2020 census.

The Town of Hopewell is in the north central part of the county, east of the City of Canandaigua.

== History ==
Significant portions of this section is sourced from Conover, Chapter XXV.

The Seneca Indian village of Onnaghee (or Onaghee, aka Snyder-McClure village) was located in Hopewell. It was abandoned sometime before 1750, and the former residents likely founded the newer village at Canandaigua.

Settled beginning in 1789, the town of Hopewell, New York, was originally part of a tract of land first called "District of Easton" and then "Lincoln" and was part of the Phelps and Gorham Purchase of 1788.

The original settlers in the area were former New Englanders. According to The History of Ontario County New York, some of the earliest pioneers included "Daniel Gates, Daniel Warner, Ezra Platt, Samuel Day, George Chapin, Israel Chapin, Jr., Frederick Follett, Thomas Sawyer, Benjamin Wells and Mr. Sweet, all of whom were from Massachusetts, while William Wyckoff who was another pioneer, was from Pennsylvania."

In 1807, the name of the town was changed again, this time to "Gorham," in honor of Nathaniel Gorham. The Town of Hopewell was formed out of the northern section of the Town of Gorham on March 29, 1822.

On April 17, 1823, the first town meeting was held and the first town officers were elected. They were:

- Supervisor – Nathan Lewis
- Town Clerk – John Prince
- Assessors – Elisha Higby, George Brundage, and James Birdseye
- Highway Commissioners – Joel S. Hart, Erastus Lamed, and William Canfield
- Overseers of the Poor – Rufus Warner and Lemuel Babcock
- Commissioner of Schools – William Buchan, Jason Angel, and Joshua Case
- Inspector of Schools – Joseph Merrill, William Bodman, and Joel Amsden
- Constables – Timothy Dunham, Hiram Dillon, William Lamed, and Joseph Parker
- Collector – Walter Wells
- Justice of the Peace – Nathaniel Lewis, John Price, Amos Jones and Elisha Higby

Between 1830 and 1890, the population of Hopewell ranged from 2,202 (1830) to 1,655 (1890).

In 1825 the County Board of Supervisors purchased farmland in the southeastern part of the town and established a home for the county poor. That land today is still owned by Ontario County and is used to house the County Health Facility, County Historian and Archives Center and other county facilities.

In 1844 members of the Fourier Society of the City of Rochester established the Ontario Union, a utopian community based on the works of French socialist Charles Fourier, in Hopewell. According to a Fourierist newspaper, the Ontario Union was located at Bates' Mills, about five miles from the main city of Canandaigua, and was home to "chairmakers, carpenters, wheelrights, millwrights, edge tool makers, blacksmiths, machinists, carriage trimmers, &c."

== Notable people ==
- George R. Babcock, former New York State Senator
- Henry Morrison Flagler, United States businessman and "Father of Miami," born in Hopewell (1830).
- Frederick Follett, journalist, newspaper editor and politician
- Daniel Myron LeFever, American gunmaker, inventor of the hammerless shotgun, born in Hopewell (1835).
- Edyth Walker, American opera singer of the Metropolitan Opera and Vienna State Opera, born in Hopewell (1867).

== Geography ==
According to the United States Census Bureau, the town has a total area of 35.7 square miles (92 km^{2}), of which 35.6 square miles (92 km^{2}) is land and 0.04 square miles (0.10 km^{2}) (0.06%) is water.

New York State Route 21 intersects New York State Route 488 in Chapin. The NY 5/US 20 concurrency runs through the southern part of the town.

Hopewell is near the northeastern end of Canandaigua Lake, one of the Finger Lakes.

== Demographics ==
Historical population
Census	Pop.	Note	%±
1830	2,202		—
1840	1,976		−10.3%
1850	1,923		−2.7%
1860	1,970		2.4%
1870	1,863		−5.4%
1880	1,894		1.7%
1890	1,655		−12.6%
1900	1,550		−6.3%
1910	1,493		−3.7%
1920	1,339		−10.3%
1930	1,365		1.9%
1940	1,456		6.7%
1950	1,506		3.4%
1960	1,822		21.0%
1970	2,347		28.8%
1980	2,509		6.9%
1990	3,016		20.2%
2000	3,346		10.9%
2010	3,747		12.0%
2020	3,931		4.9%
2022 (est.)	3,921		−0.3%
U.S. Decennial Census

As of the census of 2000, there were 3,346 people, 1,244 households, and 888 families residing in the town. The population density was 93.9 inhabitants per square mile (36.3/km^{2}). There were 1,342 housing units at an average density of 37.7 per square mile (14.6/km^{2}). The racial makeup of the town was 97.97% White, 0.78% African American, 0.30% Native American, 0.12% Asian, 0.03% Pacific Islander, 0.24% from other races, and 0.57% from two or more races. Hispanic or Latino of any race were 1.82% of the population.

There were 1,244 households, out of which 32.7% had children under the age of 18 living with them, 56.3% were married couples living together, 9.6% had a female householder with no husband present, and 28.6% were non-families. 21.1% of all households were made up of individuals, and 8.0% had someone living alone who was 65 years of age or older. The average household size was 2.60 and the average family size was 2.98.

In the town, the population was spread out, with 24.3% under the age of 18, 7.7% from 18 to 24, 28.7% from 25 to 44, 24.5% from 45 to 64, and 14.8% who were 65 years of age or older. The median age was 39 years. For every 100 females, there were 94.0 males. For every 100 females age 18 and over, there were 93.4 males.

The median income for a household in the town was $41,604, and the median income for a family was $46,452. Males had a median income of $30,575 versus $23,354 for females. The per capita income for the town was $16,899. About 4.0% of families and 7.6% of the population were below the poverty line, including 7.3% of those under age 18 and 4.5% of those age 65 or over.

== Communities and locations in Hopewell ==
- Aloquin – A hamlet in the southeast corner of the town on NY-5 and US-20.
- Canandaigua Lake Outlet – A stream crossing the northwest corner of the town.
- Chapin (formerly "Chapinville") – A hamlet in the northwest corner of the town at the junction of Routes 21 and 488. Although a railroad was built through the hamlet, the increase in business and commerce lasted only a short while.
- Ennerdale – A hamlet south of Hopewell Center, located on the former Ennerdale Road, now known as County Road 47.
- Hopewell Center (or "Hopewell") – A hamlet near the center of the town at the junction of County Roads 4 and 47.
- Lewis – An historic location in the southeast part of the town.
- Littleville – A hamlet on the northern town line, Littleville is the site of a grist mill built by Oliver Phelps in 1791. The hamlet is named after Norman C. Little who ran the Phelps mill along with a store (Conover).

== Climate ==
Climate data for Hopewell Center, NY
Month	Jan	Feb	Mar	Apr	May	Jun	Jul	Aug	Sep	Oct	Nov	Dec	Year
Mean daily maximum °F (°C)	34 (1)	36 (2)	43 (6)	55 (13)	68 (20)	77 (25)	81 (27)	79 (26)	72 (22)	61 (16)	48 (9)	37 (3)	58 (14)
Daily mean °F (°C)	27 (−3)	27 (−3)	36 (2)	46 (8)	57 (14)	66 (19)	72 (22)	70 (21)	63 (17)	52 (11)	43 (6)	30 (−1)	49 (9)
Mean daily minimum °F (°C)	18 (−8)	19 (−7)	27 (−3)	36 (2)	46 (8)	57 (14)	63 (17)	61 (16)	54 (12)	43 (6)	34 (1)	25 (−4)	40 (5)
Average precipitation inches (mm)	1.81 (46.0)	1.65 (41.9)	2.52 (64.0)	3.12 (79.2)	2.96 (75.2)	3.50 (88.9)	3.80 (96.5)	3.22 (81.8)	3.36 (85.3)	2.99 (75.9)	2.82 (71.6)	2.22 (56.4)	33.96 (862.7)

== Schools/College ==
Hopewell has no school district of its own, and a number of school districts cover the town. These include:

- Canandaigua City School District
- Gorham-Middlesex (Marcus Whitman) School District
- Manchester-Shortsville (Red Jacket) School District
- Phelps-Clifton Springs (Midlakes) School District.
- Finger Lakes Community College

== See also ==
- Killing of Sam Nordquist, which occurred in Hopewell

== Miscellaneous ==
- Hopewell is home to the Pageant of Steam Official site
- Hopewell is home to the Constellation Brands - Marvin Sands Performing Arts Center Official Site
- Hopewell is home to the Finger Lakes Community College Official site
