= Phelps (village), New York =

Phelps, New York
- Village
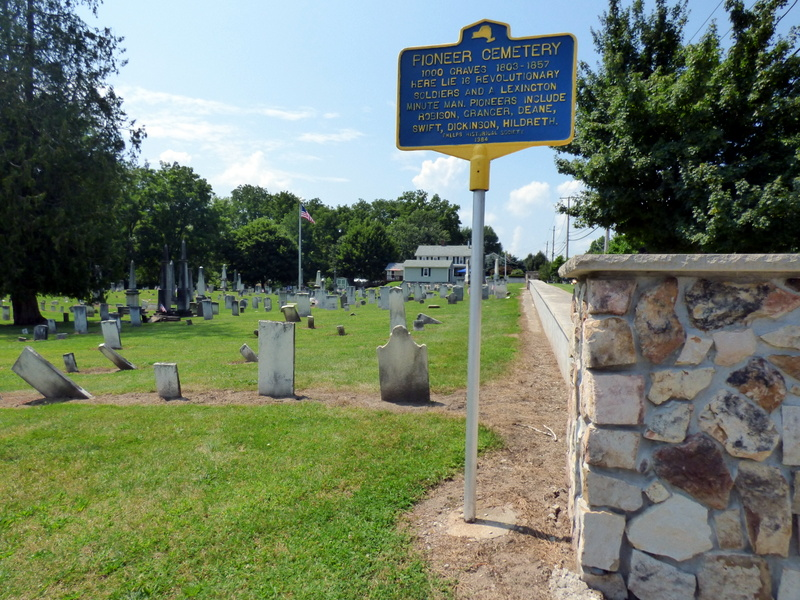
- Pioneer Cemetery

- Location within the state of New York
- Coordinates: 42°57′30″N 77°3′44″W
- Country: United States
- State: New York
- County: Ontario

Area
  - Total: 1.16 sq mi (3.00 km^{2})
  - Land: 1.16 sq mi (3.00 km^{2})
  - Water: 0 sq mi (0.00 km^{2})
- Elevation: 522 ft (159 m)

Population (2020)
  - Total: 1,851
  - Density: 1,600.0/sq mi (617.78/km^{2})
- Time zone: UTC-5 (Eastern (EST))
  - Summer (DST): UTC-4 (EDT)
- ZIP code: 14532
- Area code: 315
- FIPS code: 36-57518
- GNIS feature ID: 0960275

Phelps is a village in Ontario County, New York, United States. The population was 1,851 at the 2020 census. The village is named after an original proprietor, Oliver Phelps.

The Village of Phelps is near the center of the Town of Phelps and is north of Geneva.

A Sauerkraut Festival is held every August.

== History ==
The community was first settled around 1793, one of the first locations in the town. The village was incorporated in 1855 as "Phelps," having been earlier known as "Vienna." The village had also been mockingly called "Woodpecker City," possibly in reference to the inhabitants, who always seemed busy.

The First Baptist Church of Phelps, St. John's Episcopal Church, Phelps Town Hall, and Dr. John Quincy Howe House are listed on the National Register of Historic Places.

While Phelps, New York was still known as Vienna, it was the basis for the naming of Vienna, Virginia.

== Geography ==
Phelps is located at 42°57′30″N 77°3′44″W (42.958396, -77.062297).

According to the United States Census Bureau, the village has a total area of 1.2 square miles (3.0 km^{2}), all land.

Phelps is south of the New York State Thruway (Interstate 90). New York State Route 96 is an east–west highway passing through the village. The New York State Thruway passes north of the village.

Flint Creek flows through the village to the Canandaigua Outlet.

Phelps is in the Finger Lakes District and is north of Seneca Lake.

== Demographics ==
Historical population
Census	Pop.	Note	%±
1870	1,355		—
1880	1,369		1.0%
1890	1,336		−2.4%
1900	1,306		−2.2%
1910	1,354		3.7%
1920	1,200		−11.4%
1930	1,397		16.4%
1940	1,499		7.3%
1950	1,650		10.1%
1960	1,887		14.4%
1970	1,989		5.4%
1980	2,004		0.8%
1990	1,978		−1.3%
2000	1,969		−0.5%
2010	1,980		0.6%
2020	1,851		−6.5%
U.S. Decennial Census

As of the census of 2000, there were 1,969 people, 791 households, and 521 families residing in the village. The population density was 1,684.0 inhabitants per square mile (650.2/km^{2}). There were 877 housing units at an average density of 750.0 per square mile (289.6/km^{2}). The racial makeup of the village was 98.48% White, 0.15% Black or African American, 0.05% Native American, 0.05% Asian, 0.61% from other races, and 0.66% from two or more races. Hispanic or Latino of any race were 1.22% of the population.

There were 791 households, out of which 31.9% had children under the age of 18 living with them, 52.8% were married couples living together, 9.2% had a female householder with no husband present, and 34.1% were non-families. 27.9% of all households were made up of individuals, and 12.0% had someone living alone who was 65 years of age or older. The average household size was 2.47 and the average family size was 3.01.

In the village, the population was spread out, with 25.6% under the age of 18, 7.0% from 18 to 24, 29.1% from 25 to 44, 23.8% from 45 to 64, and 14.5% who were 65 years of age or older. The median age was 38 years. For every 100 females, there were 90.2 males. For every 100 females age 18 and over, there were 89.9 males.

The median income for a household in the village was $40,758, and the median income for a family was $48,207. Males had a median income of $32,984 versus $24,076 for females. The per capita income for the village was $20,257. About 3.9% of families and 6.1% of the population were below the poverty line, including 9.6% of those under age 18 and 3.4% of those age 65 or over.
