= Sandy Pond Beach Unique Area =

Conservation area in New York, United States

- IUCN category Ib (wilderness area)
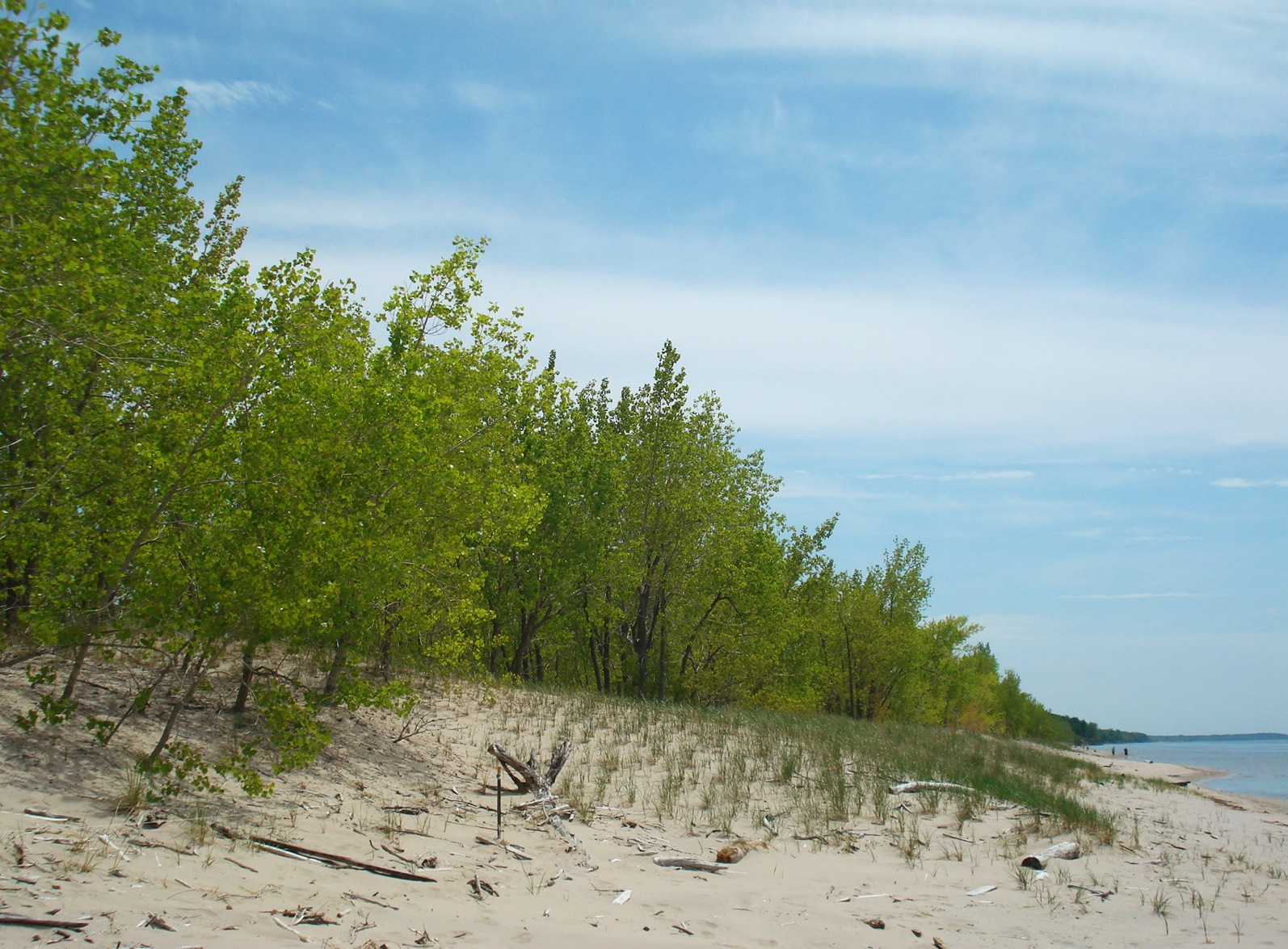
- South-facing view of the dunes along the Lake Ontario shore at Sandy Pond Beach in spring 2009.

- Location within New York
- Location: Oswego County, New York, USA
- Nearest city: Oswego, New York
- Coordinates: 43°39′36″N 76°11′46″W
- Area: 76 acres (31 ha)
- Established: 1994
- Visitors: 18,874 (in 2009)
- Governing body: NYS Department of Environmental Conservation (before 2011); NYS Office of Parks, Recreation and Historic Preservation (after 2011)

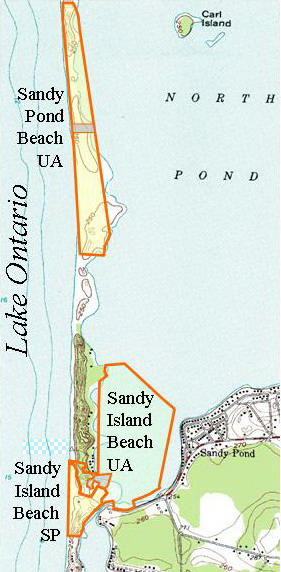
Topographic map illustrating the boundaries of Sandy Pond Beach Unique Area (UA), as well as Sandy Island Beach State Park (SP) and Sandy Island Beach Unique Area. The gray regions within the Unique Area boundaries are privately owned land.

Sandy Pond Beach Unique Area is a 76-acre (31 ha) New York State conservation area located within the eastern Lake Ontario dunes. It lies at the north end of a spit of land dividing North Sandy Pond from Lake Ontario, and is about two miles (3.2 km) north of the developed portion of Sandy Island Beach State Park. There is no road access to the area, which can be most easily reached by boat. For this reason, local residents have long referred to the beach as "Boaters' Beach". It has been managed as part of Sandy Island Beach State Park since 2011.

== History ==
The area was purchased by The Nature Conservancy in 1994 from two private owners who were concerned about preservation of the land; the purchase price was about $300,000. The new conservation area was named the Sandy Pond Beach Natural Area. The purchase was followed by a restoration effort involving beachgrass plantings and construction of boardwalks to prevent damage to the beachgrass by foot traffic. The Nature Conservancy properties were purchased by New York State to create the Unique Area, which was managed by the New York State Department of Environmental Conservation as part of the New York State Forest system.

In 2011, administration and ownership of Sandy Pond Beach Unique Area was transferred to the New York State Office of Parks, Recreation and Historic Preservation to be incorporated into nearby Sandy Island Beach State Park.

== Habitat and ecological value ==
There is a bird sanctuary on the northernmost tip of this area that hosts large numbers of shorebirds during migration; the Unique Area is part of the Eastern Lake Ontario Marshes Bird Conservation Area that also includes Deer Creek Marsh, Lakeview, and Black Pond Wildlife Management Areas. Visitors and pets are not allowed in the bird sanctuary.

The Unique Area was designated as part of the "Eastern Lake Ontario Barrier Beach and Wetland Complex" New York Natural Heritage Area in 2007.
