= Shelby, New York =

- Town
- Location in Orleans County and the state of New York.

- Location of New York in the United States
- Coordinates: 43°11′32″N 78°23′32″W
- Country: United States
- State: New York
- County: Orleans

Area
  - Total: 46.73 sq mi (121.03 km^{2})
  - Land: 46.39 sq mi (120.15 km^{2})
  - Water: 0.34 sq mi (0.88 km^{2})
- Elevation: 597 ft (182 m)

Population (2010)
  - Total: 5,319
  - Estimate (2016): 5,124
  - Density: 110.5/sq mi (42.65/km^{2})
- Time zone: UTC-5 (Eastern (EST))
  - Summer (DST): UTC-4 (EDT)
- FIPS code: 36-66751
- GNIS feature ID: 0979487

Shelby is a town in Orleans County, New York, United States. The population was 5,319 at the 2010 census.

The Town of Shelby is located in the southwest corner of Orleans County.

== History ==
The Town of Shelby was established in 1818 by a partition of the Town of Ridgeway.

Since 2002, Shelby and Ridgeway have been exploring merging functions for cost-saving and currently have one town court to serve both towns.

The John Shelp Cobblestone House was listed on the National Register of Historic Places in 2008.

== Geography ==
According to the United States Census Bureau, the town has a total area of 46.7 square miles (121 km^{2}), of which 46.3 square miles (120 km^{2}) is land and 0.4 square miles (1.0 km^{2}) (0.79%) is water.

The west town line is shared with the Town of Royalton in Niagara County, and the south town line is shared by the Town of Alabama in Genesee County.

== Demographics ==
Historical population
Census	Pop.	Note	%±
1820	1,158		—
1830	2,043		76.4%
1840	2,643		29.4%
1850	3,082		16.6%
1860	3,326		7.9%
1870	3,366		1.2%
1880	3,824		13.6%
1890	3,702		−3.2%
1900	3,679		−0.6%
1910	3,945		7.2%
1920	3,937		−0.2%
1930	3,946		0.2%
1940	3,961		0.4%
1950	4,482		13.2%
1960	5,051		12.7%
1970	5,366		6.2%
1980	5,361		−0.1%
1990	5,509		2.8%
2000	5,420		−1.6%
2010	5,319		−1.9%
2016 (est.)	5,124		−3.7%
U.S. Decennial Census

As of the census of 2000, there were 5,420 people, 2,005 households, and 1,337 families residing in the town. The population density was 117.0 inhabitants per square mile (45.2/km^{2}). There were 2,133 housing units at an average density of 46.0 per square mile (17.8/km^{2}). The racial makeup of the town was 89.70% White, 7.01% African American, 0.44% Native American, 0.35% Asian, 0.04% Pacific Islander, 1.16% from other races, and 1.29% from two or more races. Hispanic or Latino of any race were 3.28% of the population.

There were 2,005 households, out of which 31.4% had children under the age of 18 living with them, 51.0% were married couples living together, 11.3% had a female householder with no husband present, and 33.3% were non-families. 28.6% of all households were made up of individuals, and 15.8% had someone living alone who was 65 years of age or older. The average household size was 2.52 and the average family size was 3.09.

In the town, the population was spread out, with 26.5% under the age of 18, 8.7% from 18 to 24, 26.2% from 25 to 44, 20.5% from 45 to 64, and 18.1% who were 65 years of age or older. The median age was 38 years. For every 100 females, there were 92.1 males. For every 100 females age 18 and over, there were 87.6 males.

The median income for a household in the town was $34,091, and the median income for a family was $40,972. Males had a median income of $32,087 versus $21,299 for females. The per capita income for the town was $17,154. About 8.6% of families and 13.7% of the population were below the poverty line, including 16.4% of those under age 18 and 3.3% of those age 65 or over.

== Notable person ==
- Charles E. Winegar, Union artillery battery commander during the American Civil War

== Communities and locations in Shelby ==
- Iroquois National Wildlife Refuge – Part of the refuge is in Shelby.
- Medina – The south part of the Village of Medina is in the town.
- Millville – several water-powered mills gave the community its name. It is located in the northeast corner of the town on NY-31A.
- East Shelby – Located on the border with the Town of Barre.
- Oak Orchard River – This stream is usually called the Oak Orchard Creek in this area.
- Oak Orchard Wildlife Management Area – A small part is in the south part of the town.
- West Shelby – In the southwest corner of the town by the Iroquois Refuge.
- Shelby Center – Joseph Ellicott, an agent of the Holland Land Company, purchased land near here in order to use a waterfall on Oak Orchard River. This hamlet is south of Medina on NY-63.
- Shelby Basin – A former wide part of the Erie Canal, where barges could turn is west of Medina.
- Tonawanda Wildlife Management Area – A state conservation area partly in the southwest corner of the town.
