= Deer Creek Marsh Wildlife Management Area =

Protected area in New York, United States

- IUCN category IV (habitat/species management area)
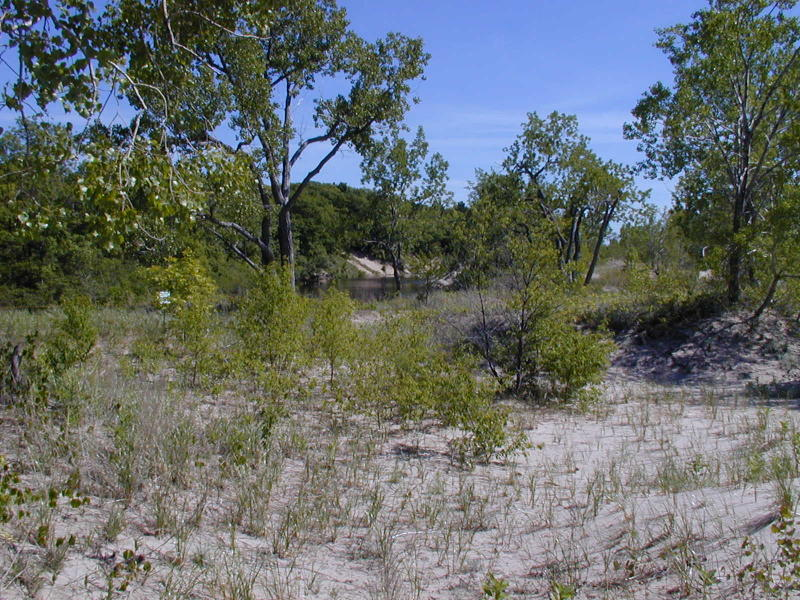
- Sandy dune and wetland in June, Deer Creek Marsh Wildlife Management Area. The plants growing on the sand include American beachgrass and Eastern cottonwood trees.

- Location within New York
- Location: Oswego County, New York
- Nearest city: Oswego, New York
- Coordinates: 43.601°N 76.198°W
- Area: 1,195 acres (484 ha)
- Established: 1979
- Visitors: 6600 (in 2009)
- Governing body: N.Y. DEC

Deer Creek Marsh Wildlife Management Area is an 1,195-acre (484 ha) New York State Wildlife Management Area (WMA) with a 4,500-foot (1,400 m) sandy beach on the eastern shore of Lake Ontario; it is in the Town of Richland in Oswego County, New York. Deer Creek Marsh lies at the southern limit of a 17-mile-long (27 km) region of sandy barrier beaches that protect coastal lagoons and marshes; the region is unusual geologically and is important as habitat for many species. Deer Creek Marsh WMA is part of the Eastern Lake Ontario Marshes Bird Conservation Area, along with Black Pond and Lakeview WMAs and the Sandy Pond Beach Unique Area. Some of the hiking and boating opportunities in the WMA are described in a brochure and a website created through the New York Sea Grant.

Until 1979, Deer Creek Marsh was divided into a number of privately held properties. The sand that underlies the region was being mined for construction and industrial purposes, and led to concern about the long-term conservation of the area. Efforts by New York State to make conventional purchases of these properties for a WMA were unsuccessful, and in the end the land was obtained through a controversial use of eminent domain.

Within the year, a project to restore the dunes commenced. Debris and unused buildings were removed. The project was partly a response to massive erosion in the region following April 1979 storms. A commission studying this erosion concluded that it was exacerbated by the degraded state of the native beachgrass and other plants along the dunes; beachgrass in particular builds and stabilizes coastal sand dunes. Damaged stands of beachgrass were replanted following some experiments with differing varieties and cultivation methods. These experiments were apparently the foundation for the extensive beachgrass restoration that was subsequently undertaken along the entire length of the eastern Lake Ontario coastal dunes.

In 2007, Deer Creek Marsh WMA was designated as part of a New York Natural Heritage Area, the "Eastern Lake Ontario Barrier Beach and Wetland Complex".

== See also ==
- List of New York state wildlife management areas
