= Reinstein Woods Nature Preserve =

Protected area in New York, United States

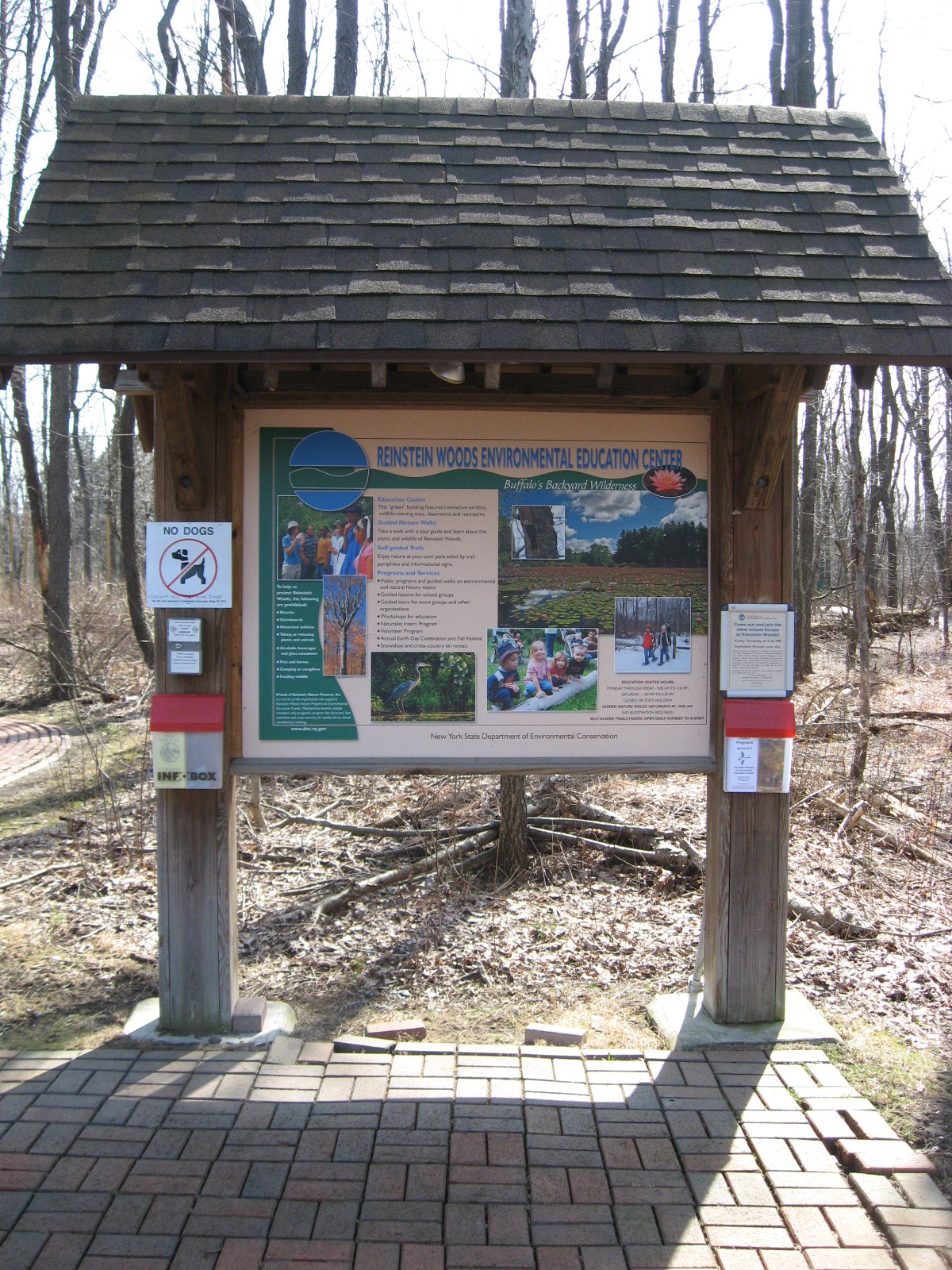
- Reinstein Woods Nature Preserve

- Location within New York
- Location: Town of Cheektowaga, Erie County, New York
- Nearest city: Buffalo
- Coordinates: 42°53′23″N 78°43′07″W
- Area: 292 acres (118 ha)

Reinstein Woods Nature Preserve is located near the city of Buffalo in the Town of Cheektowaga in Erie County, New York, USA. Reinstein Woods Nature Preserve is a 292-acre (118 ha) forested complex that also includes wetlands and ponds, located within a developed suburban area. The nature preserve also features an environmental education center.

Reinstein Woods Nature Preserve and Environmental Education Center is owned and operated by the New York State Department of Environmental Conservation.

== Programs and services ==
Reinstein Woods Nature Preserve is open to individuals, teachers, students, youth groups, and families for passive outdoor recreation and nature study. The staff at Reinstein Woods offer a variety of special programs to the public each month, including snowshoe and ski trips, walks on seasonal topics, and guided tours of the preserve. For schools, scouts, and other organizations Reinstein Woods offers guided lessons, walks, and tours on environmental and natural history topics. Snowshoe and cross-country ski rentals are available. Every year Reinstein Woods Nature Preserve has an Earth Day Celebration, Winter Wonderland, a Fall Festival, and holds an event for New York State's Get Outdoors and Get Together Day. The associated non-profit, Friends of Reinstein Woods also holds an Artisan Market in July.

== Facilities ==
The Leadership in Energy and Environmental Design (LEED) Certified Environmental Education Center was opened to the public in 2007 and features a wildlife viewing area, interpretive exhibits, classrooms, and restrooms. This "green" building showcases many energy-saving features such as natural lighting, water-conserving restrooms and recycled building materials. The education center is open Monday through Friday from 9 a.m. to 4:30 p.m. and Saturdays from 1 p.m. to 4:30 p.m. On Sundays and state holidays, the education center is closed.

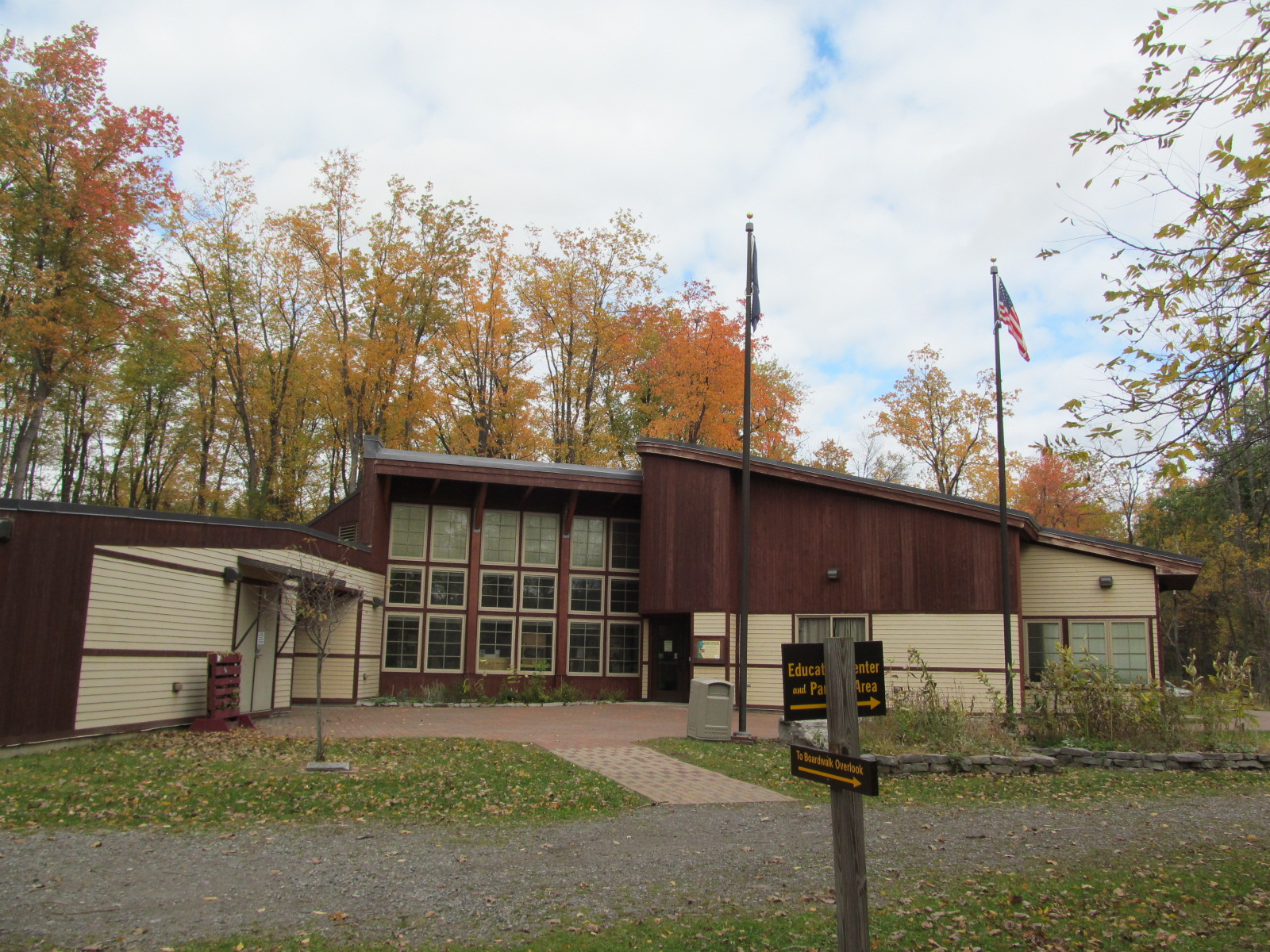
Environmental Education Center at Reinstein Woods Nature Preserve

The Nature Preserve features self-guided interpretive nature trails which are open daily from sunrise to sunset. Pamphlets and signs help visitors to enjoy nature at their own pace. Several of the trails are accessible by guided tour only.

== Wildlife ==
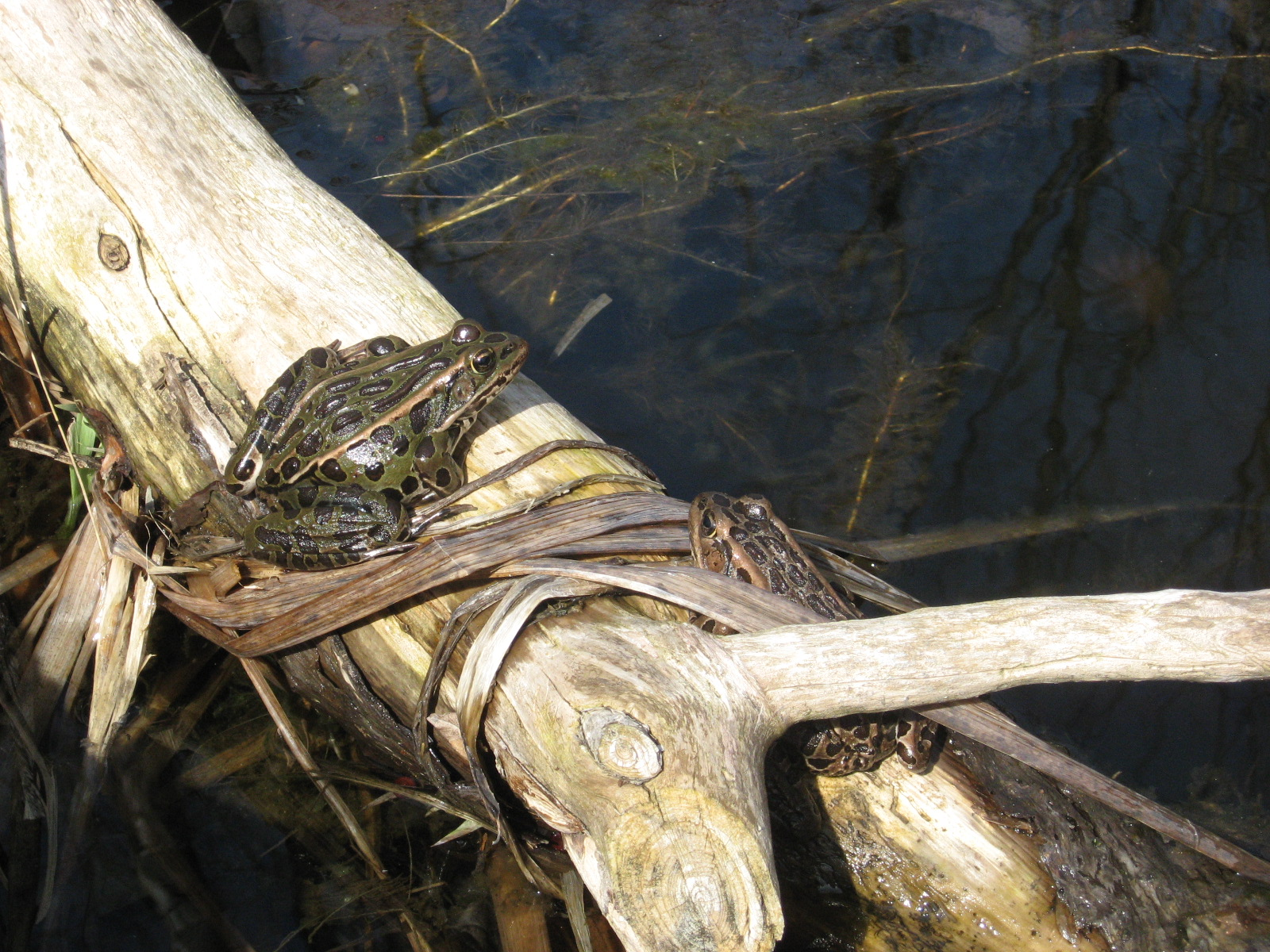
Leopard Frogs at Reinstein Woods

Many species of wildlife native to western New York can be found at Reinstein Woods Nature Preserve including white-tailed deer, mink, beavers, waterfowl, red-tailed hawks, pileated woodpeckers and great blue herons. Native wildflowers, ferns, fungi, a large variety of hardwoods, and the Reinstein pink water lilies may be observed. Reinstein Woods provides a protected place for wildlife within a suburban area.

== History ==
In 1932 the land was purchased by Dr. Victor Reinstein for a private nature sanctuary. He and his son Robert Reinstein, along with helpers John Ream and his son Fred J. Ream Sr., planted 30,000 trees, and constructed 19 ponds, marshes, and swamps during the early 1960s.

His dedication to nature conservation went as far as cleaning the ponds out every year by draining them. Every time a pond was drained he would keep the fish inside his home. When the harsh winters reached their peak Victor and his two sons would gather up geese and ducks to keep them dry and healthy.

After Reinstein's 1984 death, his widow, Julia Boyer Reinstein donated the reserve as per her husband's wishes from the Reinstein Estate to The State of New York, which assumed control of the property in 1986. The Dr. Victor Reinstein Woods Nature Preserve was officially dedicated on August 23, 1989.

In 2007 the Environmental Education Center was completed and opened to the public.

== Friends of Reinstein Nature Preserve, Inc. ==
Friends of Reinstein Nature Preserve, Inc., is a nonprofit organization that supports the environmental education programs offered by the New York State Department of Environmental Conservation at Reinstein Woods. They provide vital financial and volunteer support for programs aimed at school children, teachers, youth from underserved neighborhoods, and the general public.

The Mission of Friends of Reinstein Woods is to promote knowledge of nature through awareness, appreciation, and stewardship of the unique and diverse environment of Reinstein Woods and its programs.

== Location ==
The preserve is located on Honorine Drive, running south of Como Park Boulevard, which connects NY Route 277 (Union Road) to NY Route 78 (Transit Road).

== Other state conservation lands in Erie County ==
- Great Baehre Swamp, Town of Amherst
- Hampton Brook Woods, Town of Hamburg
- Tillman Road Wildlife Management Area, Town of Clarence
