= Great Swamp =

Great Swamp may refer to several places:

== United States ==
- Great Baehre Swamp, New York
- Great Black Swamp, Ohio
- Great Cypress Swamp, Delaware and Maryland
- Great Dismal Swamp, Virginia and North Carolina
- Great Swamp (New York), New York
- Great Swamp Fight, southern Rhode Island
- Great Swamp Brook, New Jersey
- Great Swamp National Wildlife Refuge, New Jersey
- Great Swamp, a former wetland in Massachusetts, part of which is now the Alewife Brook Reservation

== New Zealand ==
- Great Moss Swamp
