= Boots of Leather, Slippers of Gold =

1993 history of lesbians in Buffalo, New York

Boots of Leather, Slippers of Gold: The History of a Lesbian Community
- 20th anniversary edition book cover
- Author: Madeline Davis; Elizabeth L. Kennedy
- Language: English
- Genre: Oral history
- Publisher: Routledge
- Publication date: 1993
- Publication place: United States
- ISBN: 0415902932
- OCLC: 1088074986
- Dewey Decimal: 305.48/9664

Boots of Leather, Slippers of Gold: The History of a Lesbian Community is a 1993 book by Madeline Davis and Elizabeth L. Kennedy on the history of lesbian women in Buffalo and western New York state from the 1930s to the 1960s. Based on oral histories of 45 women, the book won awards from the American Sociological Association, the American Anthropological Association and the Lambda Literary Foundation. Published by Routledge, Boots of Leather, Slippers of Gold was reprinted for its 20th anniversary.

== Background ==
Davis and Kennedy developed the book over the course of 14 years of research in the lesbian community in Buffalo, New York. In the process, they often gave presentations at which their subjects were present, correcting their errors and helping shape the book rather than strictly being objects of study. Boots of Leather includes description of this process while not taking all of their subjects' comments at face value; in a review for The New York Times Jeannine Delombard wrote, “The subjects' most telling anecdotes are tempered by the authors' references to their inconsistencies."

== Synopsis ==
Davis and Kennedy argue that for the working-class women of Buffalo in mid-century America, the frequent adoption of a butch-femme framework for relationships was not a conservative replication of heterosexuality, but instead was born of resistance to a homophobic environment in which women who went out alone or only in the company of other women were at significant physical risk. Butch lesbians Davis and Kennedy studied physically fought back, developing an identity in the course of their defense of their community and their right to occupy public space.

== Awards ==
- Lambda Literary Award – Lesbian Studies, 1994
- Jessie Bernard Award, American Sociological Association, 1995
- Ruth Benedict Prize, American Anthropological Association, 1993
