= Black Pond Wildlife Management Area =

New York state wildlife management area

Black Pond Wildlife Management Area El Dorado Beach Preserve
- IUCN category IV (habitat/species management area)
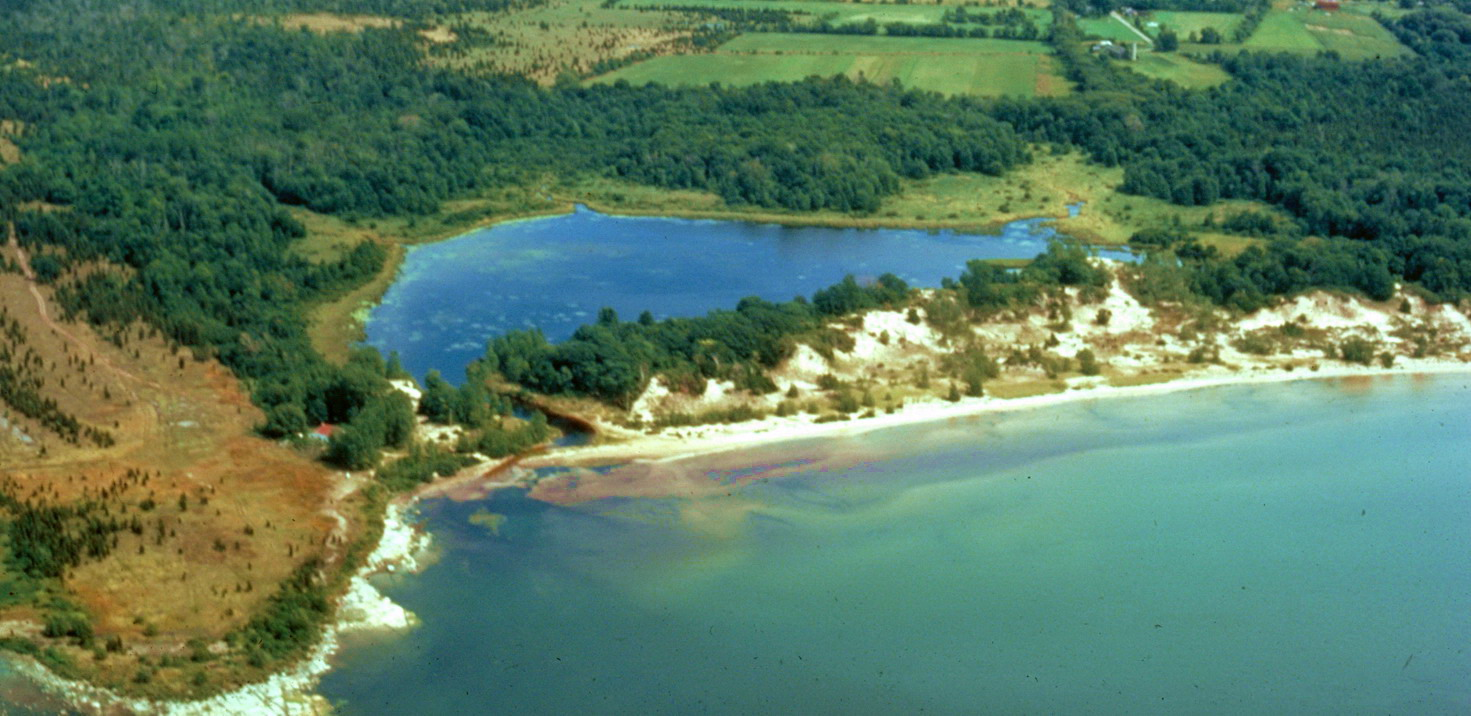
- Aerial photograph looking southeast across the Lake Ontario shoreline to Black Pond. Excepting Cape Cod, the forested dunes of the barrier beach are the highest in the northeast United States.

- Location within New York
- Location: Jefferson County, New York
- Nearest city: Watertown, New York
- Coordinates: 43.8022°N 76.2242°W
- Area: 526 acres (213 ha)
- Visitors: 8165 (in 2009)
- Governing body: N.Y. DEC

Black Pond Wildlife Management Area is a 526-acre (213 ha) New York State Wildlife Management Area (WMA) that lies on the eastern shore of Lake Ontario, and at the northern limit of an unusual region of sandy barrier beaches and lagoons. Much of the barrier beach in Black Pond WMA has forested sand dunes that are about 60 feet (18 m) high; these are the highest sand dunes in the northeast United States excepting Cape Cod. Immediately north of the WMA is the 360-acre (150 ha) El Dorado Beach Preserve, which is a bird refuge owned by The Nature Conservancy. North of the outlet from Black Pond to Lake Ontario, the shoreline is a weathered, flat bedrock shelf that is "calcareous" instead of sandy.

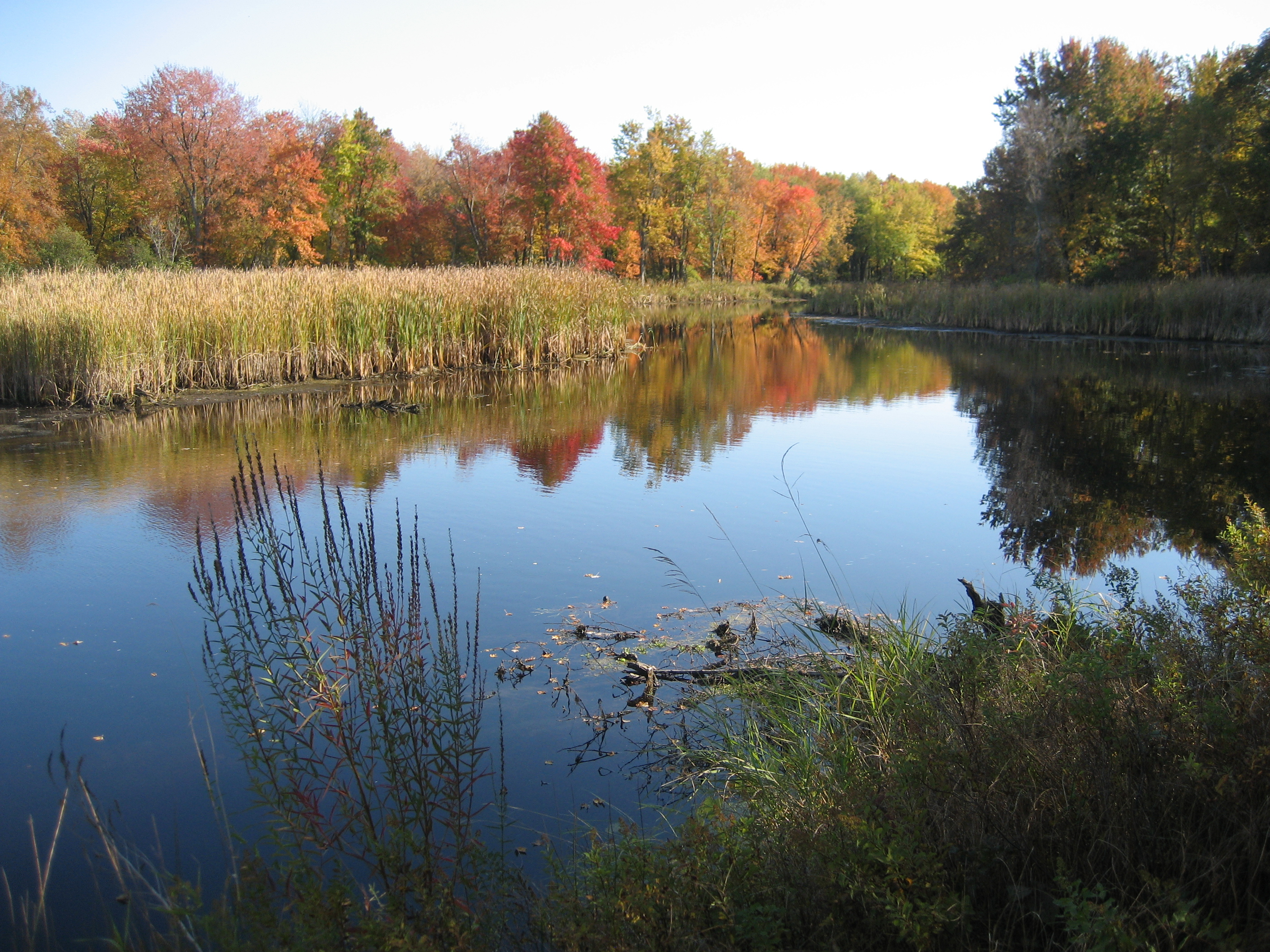
Southern leg of Black Pond in October

From the parking lot at road's end, the WMA has an accessible 0.4-mile (0.6 km) trail and boardwalk that reaches through the interior wetlands to the sandy beach on Lake Ontario. From the terminus of the boardwalk, it is possible to walk south along the beach for about 8 miles (13 km) without getting wet feet. This beach route passes out of the WMA, past the beachfront residences of Jefferson Park, through Southwick Beach State Park, and into the sizable Lakeview Wildlife Management Area. Walking north along the beach leads onto the El Dorado Beach Preserve; a hiking trail and bird-watching blinds at the Beach Preserve are normally reached by Grandjean Road, which is north of Black Pond.

Black Pond WMA, with Lakeview WMA, Deer Creek Marsh WMA, and the Sandy Pond Beach Unique Area, comprise the Eastern Lake Ontario Marshes Bird Conservation Area. The Nature Conservancy's adjacent El Dorado Beach Preserve extends this bird conservation area. Black Pond WMA, Southwick Beach State Park, Lakeview WMA, Sandy Pond Beach Natural Area, and Deer Creek Marsh WMA have been included in a New York Natural Heritage Area, the "Eastern Lake Ontario Barrier Beach and Wetland Complex".

The WMA and the Beach Preserve are in the Town of Ellisburg in Jefferson County.

== See also ==
- List of New York state wildlife management areas
- Southwick Beach State Park

== External links (including access information) ==
- "Map of Black Pond Wildlife Management Area" (PDF). New York State Department of Environmental Conservation. January 2005. Archived from the original (PDF) on March 3, 2016.
