= Margaret Small =

- Education: Duke University, University at Buffalo
- Organization: The Furies
- Notable work: Lesbians and the Class Position of Women

Margaret Small is an American lesbian activist and was noted for teaching Lesbianism 101 with Madeline Davis at the State University of New York Buffalo. This is the first lesbianism course in the United States. Small was also a civil rights activist.

== Biography ==
Small completed a political science degree at Duke University. At school, she was active in the civil rights movements and was one of the student leaders chosen to negotiate with Douglas Knight, the university president, during the Silent Vigil, the protest march at Duke after Martin Luther King Jr.'s assassination. The students occupied Knights' house during the protest. Small obtained her master's degree at SUNY Buffalo in 1973.

During the 1970s, Small became part of The Furies, a radical lesbian collective founded by Charlotte Bunch. She was also a contributor to the lesbian-feminist anthology, Lesbianism and the Women's Movement. In 1972, Small and Madeline Davis taught Lesbianism 101 at the University at Buffalo's Women Studies College. It was the first class in an American university that taught lesbian issues. Small, who was a graduate student during the course's development, was credited as the catalyst for building the lesbian program. Three years later, she published “Lesbians and the Class Position of Women”, an essay that offered a Marxist interpretation of "lesbian consciousness". In this text, she identified the concept as part of the struggle to free women from oppression.

One of the notable theories Small introduced was the idea that lesbianism is not only a sexual category but also a political strategy. She argued that lesbians have a capability to create new ways of understanding the material conditions that determine class positions of women. Small have also attacked the so-called "ideology of heterosexuality", which she claimed justified the male-beneficent organization of women's labor, specifically, the procreation and socialization of children, physical, and emotional care as well as the satisfaction of their husband's sexual needs. She maintained that, since lesbians are objectively outside of the framework of this ideology, they have the potential for developing an alternative ideology, one that is not limited by heterosexuality.
