= Hartland Swamp Wildlife Management Area =

Protected area in New York, United States

Coordinates: 43°17′06″N 78°34′55″W

The Hartland Swamp Wildlife Management Area is a 401-acre (1.62 km^{2}) wildlife management area (WMA) located in western New York, US. Hartland Swamp WMA is located northeast of Lockport in the Town of Hartland in northeastern Niagara County. It is managed by the New York State Department of Environmental Conservation.

This conservation area is one of the few places for public hunting and trapping in the county.

== Geography ==
Hartland Swamp WMA is located five miles (8.0 km) south of Lake Ontario. It is several miles north of the larger Tonawanda Wildlife Management Area. The 401-acre (1.62 km^{2}) WMA is partly wetland.

Hartland Swamp WMA is north of Ridge Road, NY-104. It can be accessed from Hartland Road at its main parking lot. Or also be accessed by road parking on Ditch or Hosmer roads.

== Public use ==
Hunting, fishing, trapping, and bird watching is permitted at Hartland Swamp WMA. Prohibited activities include camping, swimming, and the use of motorized boats and vehicles, including off-road vehicles and snowmobiles.

== See also ==
- List of New York state wildlife management areas
