= Elizabeth Lapovsky Kennedy =

American feminist (1939–2026)

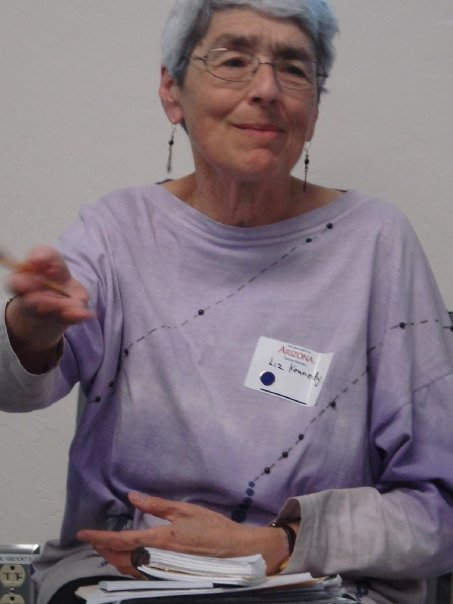
- Kennedy facilitating an anti-racism workshop at the University of Arizona in Fall 2008
- Born: December 3, 1939; Brooklyn, New York, U.S.
- Died: May 26, 2026 (aged 86); Buffalo, New York, U.S.
- Occupations: Historian, academic

Academic background
- Education: Cambridge University

Academic work
- Discipline: Women's studies
- Institutions: University at Buffalo

Elizabeth Lapovsky Kennedy (December 3, 1939 – May 26, 2026) was an American historian and academic who co-wrote the book Boots of Leather, Slippers of Gold: A History of the Lesbian Community with Madeline Davis. She was one of the founding feminists of the field of the women's studies department at the University at Buffalo.

== Early life and education ==
Elizabeth Lapovsky was born in Brooklyn, New York, on December 3, 1939. She was the second of three children to neurologist Arthur Joseph Lapovsky and Martha Schulman Lapovsky. She attended public schools, including Erasmus Hall High School.

From 1956 to 1960, she attended Smith College, earning a BA in philosophy in 1960. Lapovsky enrolled in an anthropology MA program at the University of New Mexico. After working on archaeological sites in Seattle, Albuquerque, and Jerusalem under the mentorship of Harry Basehart, she changed her focus to social anthropology. Basehart encouraged Lapovsky to study at the University of Cambridge upon completing her MA. Before leaving for Cambridge, Lapovsky married Perry Kennedy, a beatnik writer. With her husband, she became involved with the anti-Vietnam war movement in England.

She received a PhD in social anthropology in 1972 from Cambridge University after research and fieldwork on the Wounaan people in Colombia. While at Cambridge, Kennedy produced three documentary films on the Indigenous peoples of South America, allowing her to later consult with both the Canadian Broadcasting Corporation (CBC) and ITV in Great Britain.

== Work ==
Kennedy began her teaching career as a Deganaweda Fellow in American studies at SUNY/Buffalo in 1969, where she remained on faculty until 1998. In 1971, she became a faculty member.

=== Women's studies ===
In 1971, Kennedy helped found the Women's Studies College (WSC) at SUNY/Buffalo, one of the first women's studies institutions in the United States. WSC defined itself as "a place to break down prejudice built by our socialization about what women are and what they are capable of doing." Kennedy developed many of the courses offered by WSC, including Women in Contemporary Society, New Research on Women, Cross-Cultural Study of Women, and the Family as an Institution.

In 1972, literary scholar Lillian Robinson and historian Ellen Carol DuBois joined the American studies faculty, from which they worked to build WSC. The collaboration between Kennedy, Robinson and DuBois, aided by other faculty members philosopher Carolyn Korsmeyer and educational sociologist Gail Paradise Kelly, resulted in the 1985 publication of Feminist Scholarship: Kindling in the Groves of Academe. This study explored the "challenges to the traditional disciplines" of the growing field of women's studies. During the early years, Kennedy defended WSC against charges that it was discriminatory against men and that it was intellectually biased in favor of gender equality.

When the university closed down the alternative educational division in which WSC was housed, it was reformed as a division of the American studies department. In the 1980s, under Kennedy's leadership, Women's Studies/American Studies at SUNY/Buffalo acquired new faculty, concentrating on recruiting and supporting women of color.

In January 1998, Kennedy moved to Tucson, Arizona, to become head of the Department of Women's Studies at the University of Arizona. During her tenure there, Kennedy initiated the Women's Plaza of Honor with the Women's Studies Advisory Council, a project to commemorate women's contributions to history, particularly in the Southwest, as well as to support the Department of Women's Studies. Fundraising efforts from the Plaza made it possible for the department to create a PhD program in the fall of 2008. Kennedy retired from the University of Arizona, but remained a professor emeritus in the Department of Gender and Women's Studies.

After a conference to reflect on the evolution of the field of women's studies after 25 years, Kennedy co-edited and published Women's Studies for the Future: Foundations, Interrogations, Politics with Agatha Beins in 2005.

=== Lesbian history ===
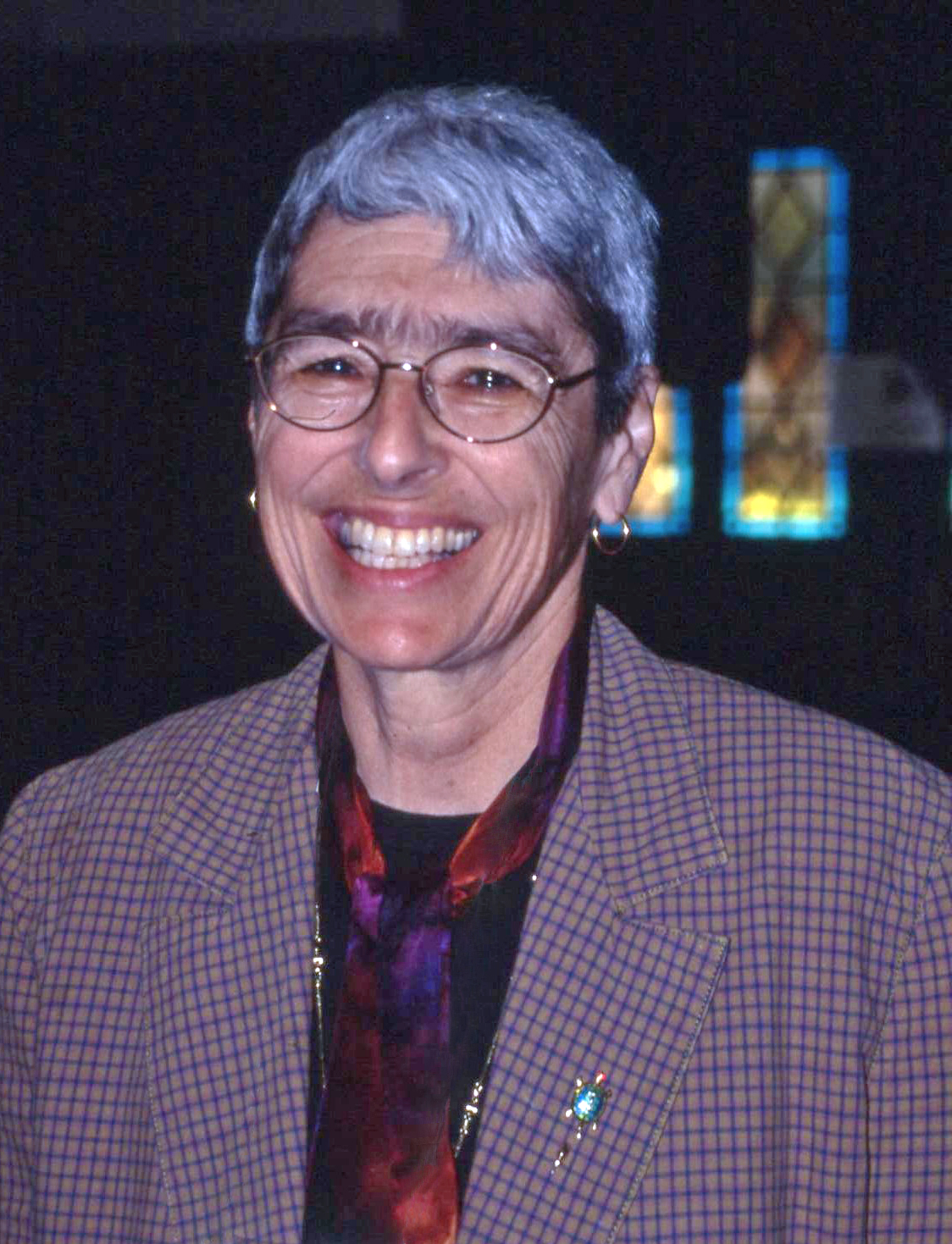
Kennedy at "The Future of the Queer Past" conference in 2000

Elizabeth Kennedy left her marriage, fell in love with a woman, and came out as a lesbian. Her partner, Barbara "Bobbi" Prebis, was one of her major informants for a thirteen-year community history project initiated in 1978 in Buffalo, New York, with Madeline Davis. The project compiled the oral histories of working-class lesbian culture from the 1930s to the 1960s and culminated in 1993 with the publication of Boots of Leather, Slippers of Gold: A History of a Lesbian Community. The book was awarded the 1995 Jessie Bernard Award the 1993 Ruth Benedict Prize, and the 1993 Lambda Literary Award for Lesbian Studies.

In her subsequent research, Kennedy undertook a case study that looked at upper-class lesbian life through the experiences of Julia Boyer Reinstein. Kennedy argued that class privilege and family acceptance allowed upper-class lesbians of the interwar period to explore their sexuality with privacy and confidence. From this perspective, the practice of hiding lesbian relationships, later known as being closeted, no longer looked simply like the result of oppression.

== Death ==
Kennedy died on May 26, 2026, at the age of 86.

== Publications ==
- Feminist Scholarship: Kindling in the Groves of Academe. University of Illinois Press. 1985. ISBN 9780252009570.
- Boots of Leather, Slippers of Gold: A History of a Lesbian Community. Routledge. 1993. ISBN 9780415902939.
- with M. Davis (1996). "Constructing an Ethnohistory of the Buffalo Lesbian Community: Reflexivity, Dialogue, and Politics". In Lewin, Ellen; Leap, William (eds.). Out in the Field: Reflections of Lesbian and Gay Anthropologists. University of Illinois Press. ISBN 9780252022197.
- Lewin, Ellen, ed. (1996). "'But We Could Never Talk about It': The Structures of Lesbian Discretion in South Dakota". Inventing Lesbian Cultures in America. Beacon Press. ISBN 9780807079423.
- Lewin, Ellen; Leap, William, eds. (2002). "'These Natives Can Speak for Themselves': The Development of Gay and Lesbian Community Studies in Anthropology". Out in Theory: The Emergence of Gay and Lesbian Anthropology. University of Illinois Press. ISBN 9780252051012.
- Women's Studies for the Future: Foundations, Interrogations, Politics. Rutgers University Press. 2005. ISBN 9780813536187.
