= Madeline Davis =

American activist and historian (1940–2021)

- Born: July 7, 1940; Buffalo, New York, U.S.
- Died: April 28, 2021 (aged 80); Amherst, New York, U.S.
- Education: University at Buffalo
- Organizations: Mattachine Society of the Niagara Frontier; Stonewall Democrats
- Notable work: Boots of Leather, Slippers of Gold: The History of a Lesbian Community
- Spouses: Allen Romano (m. 1960s; div.) Wendy Smiley (m. 1995)

Madeline Davis (July 7, 1940 – April 28, 2021) was an American LGBT activist and historian. In 1970 she was a founding member of the Mattachine Society of the Niagara Frontier, the first gay rights organization in Western New York. Davis became the first openly lesbian delegate at a major party national convention, speaking at the 1972 Democratic National Convention. The same year, she taught with Margaret Small the first course on lesbianism in the United States, titled "Lesbianism 101" at the University at Buffalo. Along with teaching, Davis helped found the "Women's Studies college at UB", which is now named the "Global Gender and Sexuality Studies Department".

In 1993, she co-authored Boots of Leather, Slippers of Gold: The History of a Lesbian Community, a history of gay women in Buffalo, New York, that won awards from the American Sociological Association, the American Anthropological Association and the Lambda Literary Foundation. She also participated in the founding of the HAG Theatre Company, the first all-lesbian theater company in the U.S., in 1994.

== Early life ==
Madeline Davis was born in Buffalo, New York, on July 7, 1940, to a factory worker at Ford Motor plant and a homemaker, Harriet, who had attended nursing school. She was the oldest of three children and described a happy upbringing in Buffalo's East Side, describing herself as a "nice Jewish girl".

At 16 she got a job at the North Jefferson branch of the Buffalo Public Library. She graduated from Bennett High School in 1958 and earned a college scholarship, where she got a job working as a page at Lockwood Memorial Library. In the 1960s Davis graduated with a degree in English and a Master of Library and Science degree from the University at Buffalo. Around this time, Davis also began singing regularly at Buffalo's beatnik coffeehouses and.

== Politics and research ==
Davis was a founder of the Mattachine Society of the Niagara Frontier in 1970 and eventually became president of the organization. She began by organizing a library for the group but, lacking publications, she and other members created Fifth Freedom, the earliest magazine for the LGBT community in western New York. In the 1970s, Davis organized "Legislative Night", at which local candidates for public office, for the first time in Buffalo political history, answered questions and sought endorsements. Davis marched and spoke at the first gay rights rally at the New York State Capitol in 1971, and participated in the original effort to lobby that state's legislature on behalf of the gay rights movement. As part of the Political Action Committee of Mattachine, she confronted the Buffalo Vice Squad on the issue of entrapment and gay bar raids.

In 1972, she became the first openly lesbian delegate in a major political convention when she was elected as a George McGovern delegate for New York's 37th Congressional district to the Democratic National Convention (DNC) in Miami, Florida. At the DNC, Davis was the first lesbian to urge the party to include gay rights as part of the 1972 platform of the Democratic Party. Davis became a member of the Democratic Committee, and worked within the party for the acceptance of gays and lesbians.

In 1972, while studying for a master's degree in women's history, Davis, with Margaret Small, taught the first course on lesbianism in the United States: "Lesbianism 101" in the American studies department at the University of Buffalo. About 20 students enrolled and up to another 20 audited the course. Davis taught a renamed version of the course, "Woman + Woman", in 1978, with a focus on lesbian history. The interview tapes from this course's final project were used as a foundation for the Buffalo Women's Oral History Project, begun in 1978, seeking to document the lives of older lesbians.

In 1973, Davis organized a Pride workshop for friends and families of gays and lesbians, which later became the local PFLAG chapter and continued to chair yearly Pride workshops on GLBT history and culture. The day before the 1976 DNC, she spoke at a protest near Madison Square Garden about the criminalization of homosexuality.

In 1988, she addressed the American Library Association's 95th conference, on AIDS in the workplace. Davis lectured on women's history, sex, and gender issues at a number of universities.

In 1993, with Elizabeth L. Kennedy, Davis co-authored Boots of Leather, Slippers of Gold: The History of a Lesbian Community, gathering 14 years of research into the history of gay women in Buffalo from the 1930s to the 1960s. Based on oral histories of 45 women, the book won awards from the American Sociological Association, the American Anthropological Association and the Lambda Literary Foundation, and was reprinted on its 20th anniversary. Davis published numerous journal and magazine articles on sexuality and women's history, as well as short stories and poetry.

In 2001, Davis founded the Buffalo Gay, Lesbian, Bisexual, Transgender Archives, which collects and preserves the history of Buffalo and western New York's gay communities. The archives were moved to the E. H. Butler Library at Buffalo State College in 2009 and called the Dr. Madeline Davis LGBTQ Archive of Western New York. The archives house the largest collection of LGBTQ+ documents in the region. Retired in 1995 from her day job as a chief conservator and head of preservation in the Buffalo and Erie County Public Library System, Davis worked as a writer, archivist, historian, political activist, and director of the archives.

In 2009, Davis was the subject of the documentary film Swimming with Lesbians, directed by David B. Marshall. The documentary outlined her work with the archives as well as her personal life and that of her close friends. The film won the Mary Elizabeth Knight Award (a juried award for best local film) at the 2009 ImageOUT film festival in Rochester, New York.

In 2012, Davis was inducted into The Advocate's Hall of Fame. Davis was the inductee representing 1972, the year she became the first openly gay delegate to a major party's national convention.

Davis continued to be involved in politics, and served as the vice president for community liaison for Stonewall Democrats.

== Music ==
Following her 1971 speech at the gay rights march in Albany, Davis wrote a poem titled, "From the Steps of the Capitol, 1971" as well as a song "Stonewall Nation" on the way home, inspired by the protest crowd. The song was recorded, released (with the poem) as a record to raise funds for the Mattachine Society of the Niagara Frontier, and became the first gay liberation record. In 2018, music website Pitchfork named it to a list of "50 Songs That Define the Last 50 Years of LGBTQ+ Pride".

Davis continued to perform women's music throughout the 1970s and 1980s. In 1983, Davis produced a tape of original lesbian music titled Daughter of All Women which included the songs "Stonewall Nation" and "Boots of Leather, Slippers of Gold," which would later form both the title and the epigraph of the history book she co-wrote with Elizabeth Lapovsky Kennedy. She also organized and performed benefit concerts for the gay community in Buffalo. Over the course of her career, she composed over 45 songs, most with gay and lesbian themes.

Additionally, in 1994, Davis co-founded Black Triangle Women's Percussion Ensemble. In the early 2000s, she continued to perform on djembe, conga, and other Afro-Caribbean instruments with the percussion group, Drawing Down the Moon.

== Theater ==
In 1971 Davis wrote, directed and produced Liberella, a feminist comedy reimagining a Cinderella who runs away with the fairy godmother. She was a founding member of HAG Theatre, the first all lesbian theater company in the U.S. In 1988, she became a member of Buffalo United Artists. In 1993, she received an Artie Award nomination for her portrayal of Mary Mallon in the one-woman drama, Cookin' With Typhoid Mary by Carolyn Gage, directed by Margaret Smith.

== Personal life ==
In her twenties, Davis became aware of her sexual orientation as a lesbian but married a man because of social pressure. He knew of her relationships with women but they ultimately divorced after a year and a half for other reasons.

In 1990, Davis moved to Kenmore, New York, to care for her aging mother.

In 1995, Davis and Wendy Smiley married at Temple Beth Zion in the first same-sex marriage performed in the Buffalo Jewish Community. Davis and Smiley first met in 1974 when Smiley heard Davis perform in a coffeehouse. The couple renewed their vows several times, including in 2011 after New York State recognized same-sex marriages.

Davis was a reiki master, with a specialty in animal healing. With Smiley, she began work on breed rescue for Keeshond dogs.

After undergoing gastric bypass surgery (GBS) in 2000 out of concern for her health, Davis founded a GBS support group that became a network of 13 GBS support groups in four counties.

Davis moved to Amherst, New York, in 2006. She suffered a stroke in January 2021 and died on April 28, 2021, in her home in Amherst.

== Awards ==
- David DeMarie Entertainer of the Year Award, 1988
- Proclamation of Madeline D. Davis Day in New York State by State Senator Byron Brown, 25 April 2004
- For Boots of Leather with co-author Elizabeth L. Kennedy:
  - Lambda Literary Award – Lesbian Studies, 1994
  - Jessie Bernard Award from the American Sociological Association, 1995
  - Ruth Benedict Prize from the American Anthropological Association, 1993
- Owen Augspurger Award from the Buffalo History Museum, 2013
- Honorary doctorate from SUNY Buffalo State College, 2016

== Publications ==
- Davis, Madeline; Kennedy, Elizabeth Lapovsky (1986). "Oral History and the Study of Sexuality in the Lesbian Community: Buffalo, New York, 1940–1960". Feminist Studies. 12 (1): 7. doi:10.2307/3177981. JSTOR 3177981.
- Nestle, Joan, ed. (1992). "The Femme Tapes". The Persistent Desire: A Femme-Butch Reader. Boston: Alyson Books. ISBN 1-55583-190-7. OCLC 25412061.
- Nestle, Joan, ed. (1992). "'They Was No One to Mess With': The Construction of the Butch Role in the Lesbian Community of the 1940s and 1950". The Persistent Desire: A Femme-Butch Reader. Boston: Alyson Books. ISBN 1-55583-190-7. OCLC 25412061.
- Davis, Madeline D.; Kennedy, Elizabeth Lapovsky (2014) [1994]. Boots of Leather, Slippers of Gold: The History of a Lesbian Community. New York: Routledge. ISBN 978-1-317-66397-3. OCLC 880147850.
- Califia, Pat; Sweeney, Robin, eds. (1996). "The Piercing". The Second Coming: A Leatherdyke Reader. Los Angeles: Alyson Publications. ISBN 1-55583-281-4. OCLC 35449573.
- Harris, Laura; Crocker, Elizabeth, eds. (1997). "Forever Femme: A Soap Opera in Many Acts and an Agony of Analysis". Femme: Feminists, Lesbians, and Bad Girls. New York: Routledge. ISBN 0-415-91873-1. OCLC 36186830.
