= Great Baehre Swamp =

Wetland in Erie County, New York, U.S.

- Location within New York
- Nearest city: North Tonawanda
- Coordinates: 43°00′49″N 78°44′18″W
- Website: www.dec.ny.gov/outdoor/82840.html

Great Baehre Swamp is a New York state wetland located inside the Town of Amherst in Erie County, New York, United States. The area is characterized as a silver maple-ash swamp of 270 acres (1.1 km^{2}), much of which is protected by conservation areas owned by the town and New York State.

== Prehistory and history ==
The wetlands are a minute remnant of the former Glacial Lake Tonawanda that dominated this region 11,000 years ago.

Hopkins Road was originally constructed as a corduroy road in the early 19th century due to the boggy nature of the soil.

== Protected areas ==
Much of the swamp is protected and accessible to the public. Portions of the southern and eastern boundary of the conservation area are privately owned and permission should be sought prior to visiting these areas.

=== Billy Wilson Park ===
Billy Wilson Park, a 48-acre (19 ha) park owned and operated by the Town of Amherst, is adjacent to the western portion of the swamp. A portion of the park was formerly a small municipal dump for the Town of Amherst from the 1920s to the 1960s; it was remediated and repurposed as parkland in 1989. Billy Wilson Park provides boardwalks and trails for viewing nature within Amherst, which is a well-developed suburb of Buffalo. Conservation of the wetlands is also intended to help control flooding.

The entrance to Billy Wilson Park is located on Hopkins Road north of the intersection with Klein Road in Amherst. The park has been adapted to provide assistance to people with disabilities. The park was formerly known as Margaret Louise Park prior to being renamed in 2014 for Army Staff Sgt. William "Billy" Wilson III, who was killed in Afghanistan in 2012.

=== Great Baehre Swamp Wildlife Management Area ===
The Great Baehre Swamp Wildlife Management Area is a 270-acre (110 ha) state wildlife management area operated by the New York State Department of Environmental Conservation (NYSDEC). The majority of the property (260 acres [110 ha]) protects shrub swamp and emergent wetlands, with the remainder covering grassland and brush. Parking and access is mainly facilitated through the adjacent Billy Wilson Park on Hopkins Road.

The area was acquired by NYSDEC in 1989, and has since been improved with a 1,300-foot (400 m) boardwalk which connects with Billy Wilson Park. The area is managed with the goal of improving wildlife populations and habitat.

== See also ==
- List of New York state wildlife management areas
- Tillman Road Wildlife Management Area, a state conservation area several miles east of Great Baehre Swamp.
- Reinstein Woods Nature Preserve, a state conservation area southeast of Great Baehre Swamp.
