= Iroquois National Wildlife Refuge =

Wildlife Refuge located in Genesee and Orleans County, NY

- IUCN category IV (habitat/species management area)
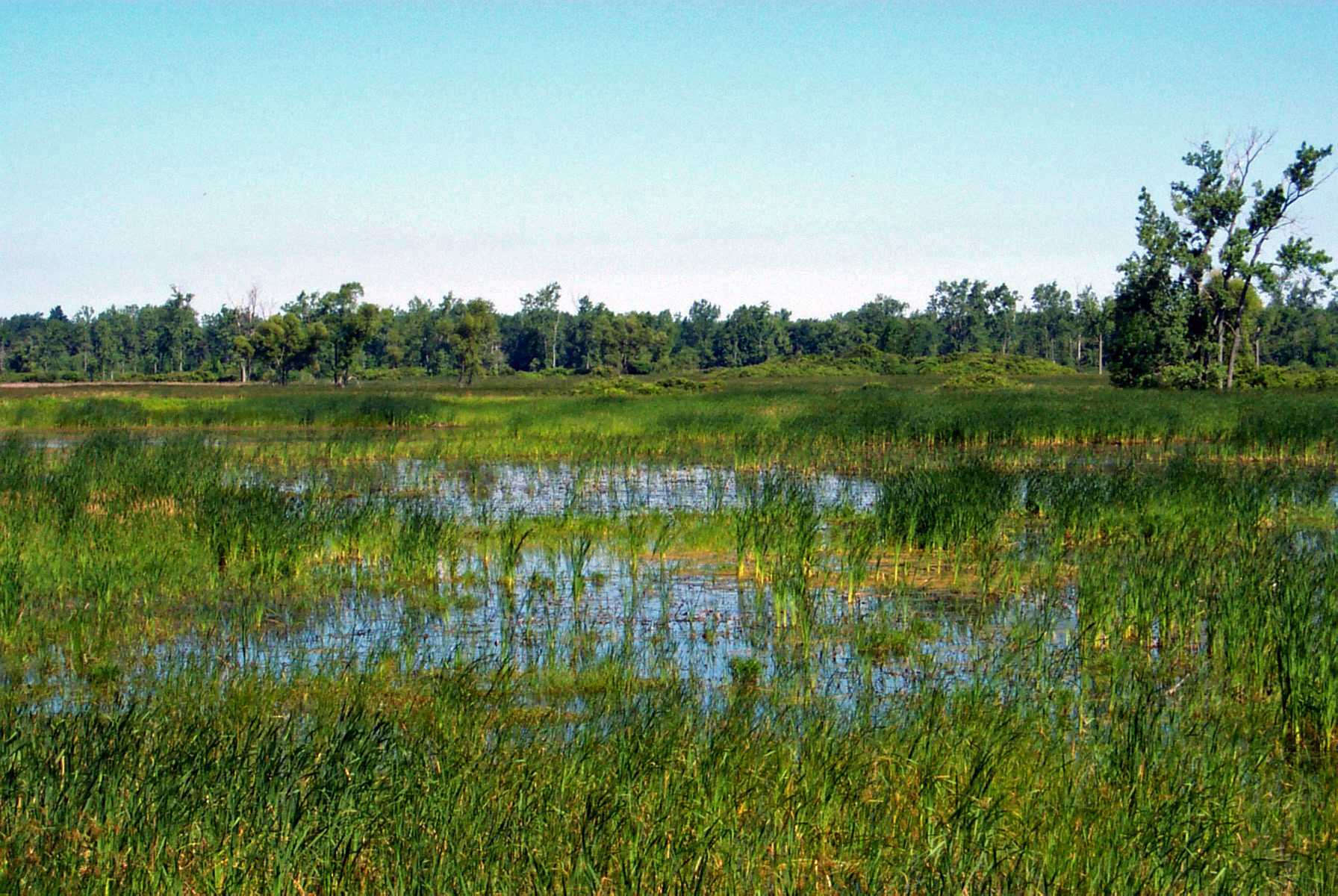

- Location within New York Location within the United States
- Location: Genesee and Orleans counties, New York, United States
- Nearest city: Batavia, New York
- Coordinates: 43°07′N 78°21′W
- Area: 10,828 acres (43.82 km^{2})
- Established: May 19, 1958
- Governing body: U.S. Fish and Wildlife Service
- Website: Iroquois National Wildlife Refuge

The Iroquois National Wildlife Refuge is a wildlife refuge in Genesee and Orleans counties in western New York. The refuge is located between the cities of Buffalo and Rochester and is operated by the United States Fish and Wildlife Service.

The refuge headquarters and visitor center are located at 1101 Casey Road in Alabama, New York. The Orleans County portion of the refuge lies in the town of Shelby.

== Fauna ==
Mammalian species that inhabit this refuge include white-tailed deer, species of squirrel, porcupine, muskrat, raccoon, coyote, skunk, beaver, species of chipmunk, river otter, two species of fox, bobcat, mink, opossum and woodchuck.

== History ==
The refuge was created in 1958 as the Oak Orchard National Wildlife Refuge, however the name was soon changed to avoid confusion with the similarly named Oak Orchard Wildlife Management Area, a state-owned conservation area adjacent to the federal refuge at its eastern boundary. Both areas, along with the Tonawanda Wildlife Management Area, located on the western side of the federal land, are used not only as stopping points for waterfowl and other migratory birds, but also to provide habitat for a variety of other animals. All three areas constitute the Alabama Swamp Complex. Iroquois National Wildlife Refuge is managed by the U.S. Fish and Wildlife Service while Oak Orchard and Tonawanda Wildlife Management Areas are managed by the New York State Department of Environmental Conservation.

== Facilities ==
The 10,828-acre (43.82 km^{2}) refuge encompasses several large pools (separated by dikes), swamps, meadows, fields, and woodlands. There are four overlooks and four trails that are open throughout the year. All areas of the refuge, except the nature trails, overlooks, and fishing areas, are closed from March 1 to October 1 to protect nesting birds and other wildlife. Each year at least one of the large pools is drained to allow restoration of the wetland. The refuge has been designated as an important bird area (IBA) because it is a key resting spot for birds when they are migrating.

=== Structure ===
The western half of the refuge is divided into four large wetlands: Cayuga Pool, Mohawk Pool, Oneida Pool, and Seneca Pool. The Feeder Road, an unpaved north–south road, separates the Seneca and Cayuga pools from the other two. Cayuga Pool off of Route 77 has an observation platform in the parking lot. Kanyoo Trail, located nearby to the east, has two loops (0.33 and 1 mile [0.53 and 1.61 km] long). Feeder Road (3.5 miles [5.6 km] one way) is open to pedestrians year round.

The eastern half of the refuge contains a scattering of smaller pools, many marshy areas, fields, and upland forests. The Swallow Hollow Trail (a 1.3-mile [2.1 km] loop) is located at the eastern edge of the refuge on Knowlesville Road and circles Swallow Hollow Marsh. The Onondaga Trail (1.2 miles [1.9 km] one way) is located off Sour Springs Road and passes along the north side of Onondaga Pool into a mature woods.

== Geography ==
The wetlands are watered by Oak Orchard Creek.

New York State Route 63 is a north–south highway passing through the center of the refuge.

== Public use ==
Iroquois National Wildlife Refuge allows hiking, cross-country skiing, snowshoeing, nature observation, and photography. Non-motorized boats may be used on Oak Orchard Creek between Knowlesville Road and NY-63. Bicycles are permitted only on public roads within the refuge. Hunting, fishing and trapping are allowed in-season with the proper permits.

Prohibited activities include camping, disturbing historical artifacts, swimming, fires, removing wildlife and plants, horseback riding and off-road vehicle use, and carrying firearms except during hunting season (with permit).

The Iroquois Job Corps is located within Iroquois National Wildlife Refuge at 11780 Tibbets Road in Medina.

== See also ==
- List of National Wildlife Refuges
- Montezuma National Wildlife Refuge, located farther east
