= Julia Boyer Reinstein =

American historian (1906–1998)

- Reinstein in 1966
- Born: Julia Agnes Boyer; November 3, 1906; Castile, New York, U.S.
- Died: July 18, 1998 (aged 91); Cheektowaga, New York, U.S.
- Other name: Mrs. Victor Reinstein
- Occupations: teacher, historian
- Years active: 1928–1992
- Known for: philanthropy

Julia Boyer Reinstein (November 3, 1906 – July 18, 1998) was an American teacher and historian who grew up in western New York and began her career teaching in Deadwood, South Dakota. After more than a decade of teaching, she became a founder of the Erie County Historical Federation and the first historian of Cheektowaga, New York. She and her husband donated properties for the establishment of a nature preserve, several libraries, and higher education institutions. She was a subject of an anthropological study evaluating gender fluidity and public knowledge of sexuality in the 1990s.

== Early life ==
Julia Agnes Boyer was born on November 3, 1906, in Castile, New York, to Julia (née Smith) and Lee Boyer. Boyer's father was an engineer who worked with Western Union Telegraph Company and then on various power and light projects throughout the Great Plains including in Kansas City, St. Louis, and Indian Territory, before becoming the general manager of the Consolidated Power and Light Company in the Black Hills of South Dakota. When Boyer was six weeks old, her mother left New York to join her father who was working on an engineering job in Wolseley, Saskatchewan. Her parents divorced when she was about 1 1/2 years old, and her mother took her back to Castile, where she found work as a school teacher. Her mother's family were prominent in rural western New York, where her grandfather, Frederick H. Smith, worked as a cattleman, lawyer, and banker. Her great-aunt and great-uncle, Julia A. Norris (née Pickett) and Fred Norris, who helped raise Boyer, were the owners of the newspaper in Warsaw, New York.

In 1915, Boyer's mother married Charles Mason, the owner of a general store in Silver Springs. Boyer remained in Warsaw, living with the Norrises, and visited her mother and step-father on weekends. Her father was not allowed to make contact with Boyer, per the terms of her parents' divorce, until she turned eighteen. In 1924 Boyer enrolled at Elmira College and began exploring her lesbian feelings. In 1926, her father made contact with her and they met. He was accepting of her lesbianism and the two began to reconnect. When she graduated in 1928 with a bachelor's degree and a teaching certificate, Boyer moved to Deadwood, South Dakota, to live with her father and step-mother, Sarah Isabel (née Rouch).

Upon arriving in Deadwood, Boyer began accompanying her father on business trips. She often flirted with other women, though while she was open about her sexual attraction with her family and intimate circle, she remained discreet publicly. Her father supported her affairs and even helped arrange them. In turn, she maintained discretion about his extramarital affairs.

== Relationships and career ==
With the advent of the Great Depression, Boyer took a job in one of the mining camps near Deadwood and worked there for two years. When she decided to continue her education in Chicago, her father did not want her to leave and used his influence to help her obtain employment in the Deadwood school system. In 1930, she met another teacher, Dorothy Brashier, and they fell in love. They developed a social circle of other lesbian couples, and though they did not hide their relationships, they did not discuss them openly.

When Boyer's father died unexpectedly in 1933, she left Deadwood and returned to her mother's family in New York. She obtained a teaching position in Castile, bringing Brashier with her. During the week, she rented rooms in town, but on weekends she and Brashier shared a suite her mother and step-father had created for them in their home. During their summer breaks, the couple rented an apartment in New York City, to facilitate their taking master's courses at Columbia University.

In the early 1940s, Brashier left Boyer and Boyer accepted employment in Buffalo. The circumstances there did not allow her to find female companions. Soon after she attained her master's degree in education from Columbia, Boyer married Victor Reinstein on 28 September 1942 in Baltimore, Maryland, and thereafter used the name Julia Boyer Reinstein, keeping her maiden name both as a fallback in case of invasion of the US by the Nazis and to acknowledge that she never truly gave up her lesbian orientation. After teaching in the state of New York for a decade, Boyer Reinstein worked for a year and a half at the University of Buffalo in the history department. In 1953, she became the first historian of Cheektowaga and was one of the founders of the Erie County Historical Federation, serving as its president. When the federation was founded there were only seven affiliates; they reached twenty-eight societies during her tenure.

Boyer Reinstein was active in multiple endeavors, serving as vice-chair of the Cheektowaga Public Library board and as a member of the Erie County Historical Preservation Committee. She was a sought-after speaker, and in addition to publishing map books and stories on county history, she and her husband became benefactors for the area. They donated the property for the Reinstein Woods Nature Preserve and built the Anna M. Reinstein Library in Cheektowaga. The couple also donated funds to establish the Julia Boyer Reinstein Library in Cheektowaga and the Buffalo History Museum's Julia Boyer Reinstein Center on the museum's campus. After her husband's death in 1984, Boyer Reinstein resumed her life as a lesbian. In 1990, Boyer Reinstein began a series of donations to Elmira College to establish the Department of Women's Studies. An annual symposium in her honor is held by the college to promote scholarship on women.

== Death and legacy ==
Boyer Reinstein died on July 18, 1998, and her memorial was held four days later in Cheektowaga, New York.

Reinstein was the subject of a 1996 anthropological study of lesbian life done by Elizabeth Lapovsky Kennedy, evaluating the difference between middle-class and upper-class lesbian lives. Kennedy undertook the study to examine the understanding of what it meant to be out as a lesbian, women's sexuality energy in the period, and parental acceptance. She concluded that due to Reinstein's family's prominence in their community and the taboos of talking about intimacy publicly, lesbians in her social class were protected and allowed to live their lives as long as they appeared as dutiful daughters and respected social mores. Kennedy also theorized that the closet was not oppressive, but rather, allowed women of Reinstein's class the freedom to express themselves in the private rather than public sphere.

Reinstein donated the Reinstein Family Archives to the Anna M. Reinstein Memorial Library in Cheektowaga, NY. The collection was opened to the public in 2010 and remains open by appointment at the Harlem Road branch of the Cheektowaga Public Libraries.

== Bibliography ==
- Fisher, Forrest (August 4, 1994). "Spotting deer in majestic velvet". The Sun. Hamburg, New York. p. 20 – via Newspapers.com.
- Hogan, Steve; Hudson, Lee (1999). Completely Queer: the Gay and Lesbian Encyclopedia (1st Owl Books ed.). New York: Henry Holt. ISBN 0-8050-6031-6.
- Jakobsen, Janet R.; Kennedy, Elizabeth Lapovsky (2005). "Sex and Freedom". In Bernstein, Elizabeth; Schaffner, Laurie (eds.). Regulating Sex: The Politics of Intimacy and Identity. New York City, New York: Routledge. pp. 247–270. ISBN 978-1-135-93403-3.
- Kennedy, Elizabeth Lapovsky (1996). ""But we would never talk about it": The Structures of Lesbian Discretion in South Dakota, 1928-1933". In Lewin, Ellen (ed.). Inventing lesbian cultures in America. Boston: Beacon Press. pp. 15–39. ISBN 0-8070-7942-1.
- Reinstein, Julia Boyer (April 1979). "A Postscript to 'Alaska Calling'" (PDF). Historical Wyoming. XXVI (4). Warsaw, New York: Wyoming County Historian's Office: 99–100.
- Rey, Jay (July 22, 1998). "Town Bids Farewell to Julia Reinstein". Buffalo, New York: The Buffalo News. Archived from the original on 24 June 2017.
- Rupp, Leila J. (1999). A Desired Past: A Short History of Same-Sex Love in America. Chicago, Illinois: University of Chicago Press. ISBN 978-0-226-73155-1.
- Wisniewski, John (June 15, 1979). "New Library Called Regional Asset". Syracuse, New York: The Post-Standard. p. 6 – via Newspaperarchive.com.
- "1920 United States Census: Silver Spring Village, Wyoming County, New York". FamilySearch. Washington D.C.: National Archives and Records Administration. 19 January 1920. NARA microfilm series T625, roll 1274.
- "1930 United States Census: Deadwood, Lawrence County, South Dakota". FamilySearch. Washington D.C.: National Archives and Records Administration. 25 April 1930. NARA microfilm series T626, roll 2226.
- "Antiques Study Group Topic Is Old Homes". Hamburg, New York: The Sun and Erie County Independent. March 7, 1963. p. 7 – via Newspapers.com.
- "Boyer-Reinstein". Deadwood, South Dakota: The Deadwood Pioneer-Times. October 21, 1942. p. 1 – via Newspapers.com.
- "Cultural Pact". Hamburg, New York: The Sun and Erie County Independent. July 5, 1979. p. 16 – via Newspapers.com.
- "Death Claims Lee Boyer at Hospital Here". Deadwood, South Dakota: The Weekly Pioneer-Times. July 6, 1933. p. 2 – via Newspapers.com.
- "Degrees Conferred 1942–1943: Teachers College Master of Arts". Catalogue: 1943–1944 and 1944–1945. New York City, New York: Columbia University. 1945. pp. 270–286.
- "Final Lecture in Horning Series to Examine Life of Julia Boyer Reinstein". News and Research Communications. Corvallis, Oregon: Oregon State University. April 25, 2006. Archived from the original on 25 June 2017.
- "Fred Norris". Warsaw, New York: The Wyoming County Times. May 18, 1950. p. 8.
- "Genealogists Plan Workshop this Weekend". Syracuse, New York: The Post-Standard. June 24, 1970. p. 17 – via Newspapers.com.
- "Historical Federation Head Speaker Here". The Sun. Hamburg, New York. October 20, 1966. p. 3 – via Newspapers.com.
- "History and Archives". Elmira College. Elmira, New York. 2015. Archived from the original on 25 June 2017.
- "Iowa Marriages, 1809–1992: Lee M. Boyer/Sarah Isabel Rouch". FamilySearch. Fairfield, Iowa: Jefferson County Courthouse. 14 September 1911. FHL microfilm #1750233, reference 2:3R89GFT.
- "United States Social Security Death Index: Julia B Reinstein". FamilySearch. Alexandria, Virginia: U.S. Social Security Administration. 18 July 1998.
- "Warner Museum & Historical Society". Springville, New York: The Springville Journal. March 20, 1958. p. 1 – via Newspapers.com.
- "(untitled)". Elmira, New York: The Star-Gazette. August 20, 1915. p. 5 – via Newspapers.com.
