= John Shelp Cobblestone House =

Historic house in New York, United States

- U.S. National Register of Historic Places
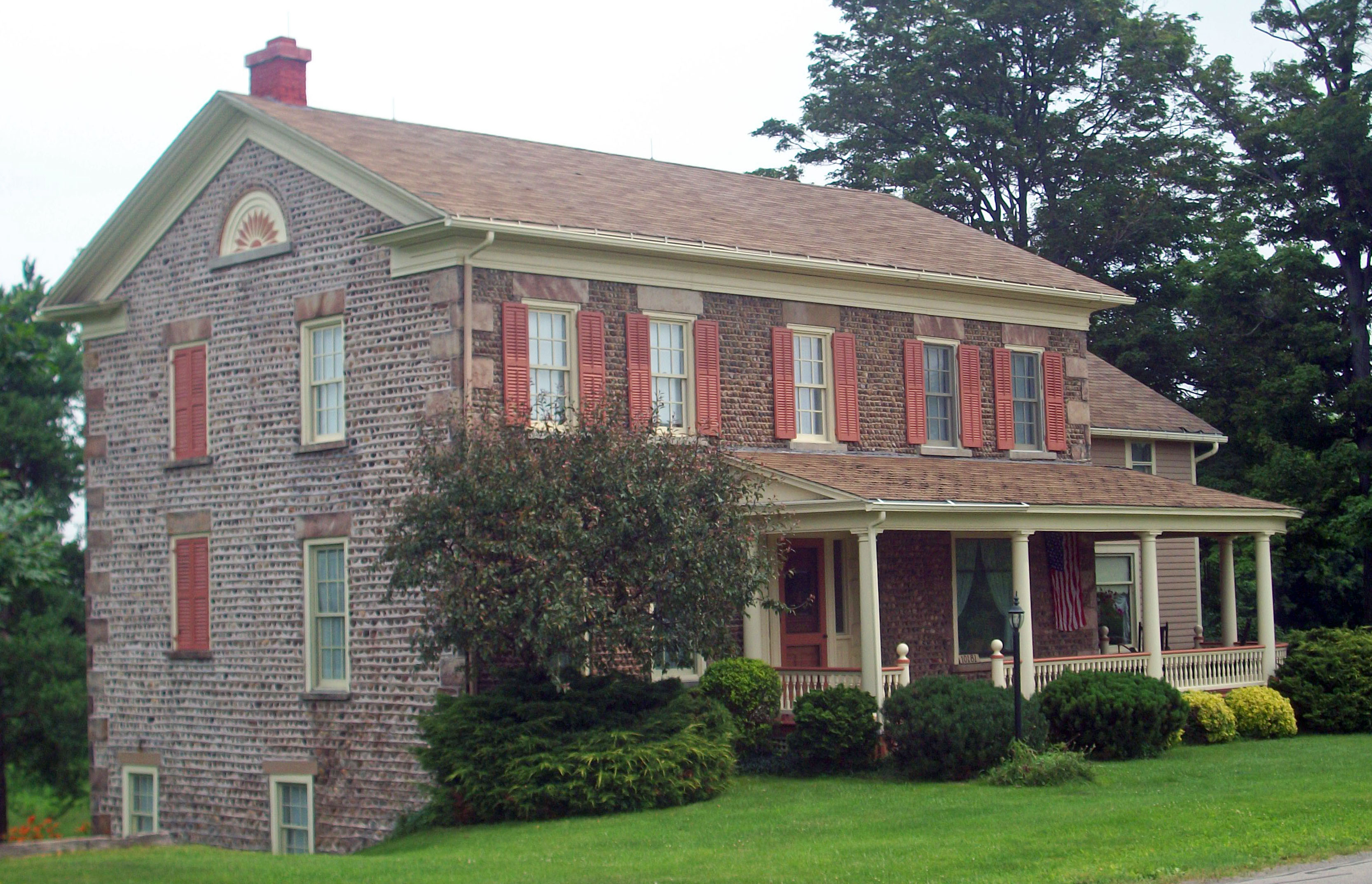
- East profile and south (front) elevation, 2010

- Location within New York Location within the United States
- Location: West Shelby, NY
- Nearest city: Lockport
- Coordinates: 43°9′17″N 78°27′51″W
- Area: 11 acres (4.5 ha)
- Built: 1836
- Architectural style: Greek Revival
- MPS: Cobblestone Architecture of New York State MPS
- NRHP reference No.: 08001079
- Added to NRHP: November 20, 2008

The John Shelp Cobblestone House, also known as the Shelp–Beamer House, is located on West Shelby Road (Orleans County Route 87) in West Shelby, New York, United States, just east of the Niagara–Orleans county line. It is an 1830s cobblestone house in the Greek Revival architectural style.

Of the six cobblestone buildings in the Town of Shelby, it is the most accomplished stylistically. In the late 19th century, the interior was renovated into a more contemporary style. In 2008, the house, two barns, and a milk house on the grounds were listed on the National Register of Historic Places.

== Buildings and grounds ==
The house is located near the southwest corner of an 11-acre (4.5 ha) lot at the northeast corner of the junction of South County Line and West Shelby roads. The area is rural, with large lots consisting primarily of worked fields with some scattered second-growth trees, a large wooded area to the south-southeast, and houses at the roads. It is generally level with a slight slope to the north. In the rear are the three contributing outbuildings.

The main house has two sections, a two-story five-by-two-bay main block with a two-by-two-bay wood frame two-story wing on the northeast corner. The slope of the ground exposes the basement at the rear, giving the house the appearance of three stories. Both sections are topped by shallow pitched gabled roofs shingled in asphalt. The main block is pierced by a single brick chimney at the south end.

A shed-roofed porch with wooden Tuscan columns and balustrade covers the centrally located main entrance, the two bays to its west, and the east elevation of the main block. The cobblestone siding consists of four horizontal rows per limestone quoin of medium-sized field stones with lime mortar between. Windowsills and lintels are of cut stone.

Wooden louvered shutters flank the six-over-six double-hung sash windows; on the west facade the two northern windows are shuttered and the south window on the first story longer than the other three. The two bays east of the entrance have large plate glass windows. At the roofline a molded wooden frieze sets off an overhanging cornice with returns. Blind lunettes are located in the gable fields.

A screen door protects the paneled front door, set off by sidelights. It opens into a central hallway with a natural-finish oak staircase rising two flights to the second story. Oak is also used for the paneled spaces below the stair's balustrade, which incorporates a small bench.

All interior woodwork on the first floor is similar natural-finish oak. The door and window surrounds are flat pilasters with ogee-profile moldings at the entablature. In the basement is the original kitchen fireplace, with bake oven.

The milk house is a single-story single-bay frame structure with gabled roof, a door and two windows. The main barn is on a rubblestone foundation, with an earthen ramp providing entrance. Both it and the two-story gabled carriage barn, where sliding doors provide access to both levels, are sided in vertical board and batten.

== History ==
Shelp, a Schoharie County native who married Mary Ann Cone, daughter of an early Shelby landowner, bought the 80 acres (32 ha) where the house now stands in 1828. Five years later, in 1833, he bought another 40 acres (16 ha). In 1836 he moved his family into the new house. Originally, it had four chimneys. Three were decorative, one was functional. Its flue angles to the space between the windows, suggesting along with the date of construction that the owner was using heating stoves, then a new technology, to heat the house rather than the fireplaces.

Shelp stayed at the house until his death in 1868. He and his descendants were prosperous and productive farmers who expanded and improved the property. Around 1900, apparently after a stove fire in the dining room, renovations were made that brought the interior into that time period. The wooden staircase is consistent with the Queen Anne style, and the porch reflects emerging Colonial Revival tastes.

In the middle of the 20th century the house was abandoned and fell into some disrepair. The current owners bought and restored it to its 1900 appearance in the mid-1960s, finding the evidence of the dining-room fire in the process. There have been no other alterations to the property.

== See also ==
- National Register of Historic Places listings in Orleans County, New York
