= New York State Wildlife Management Areas =

Protected area in New York, US

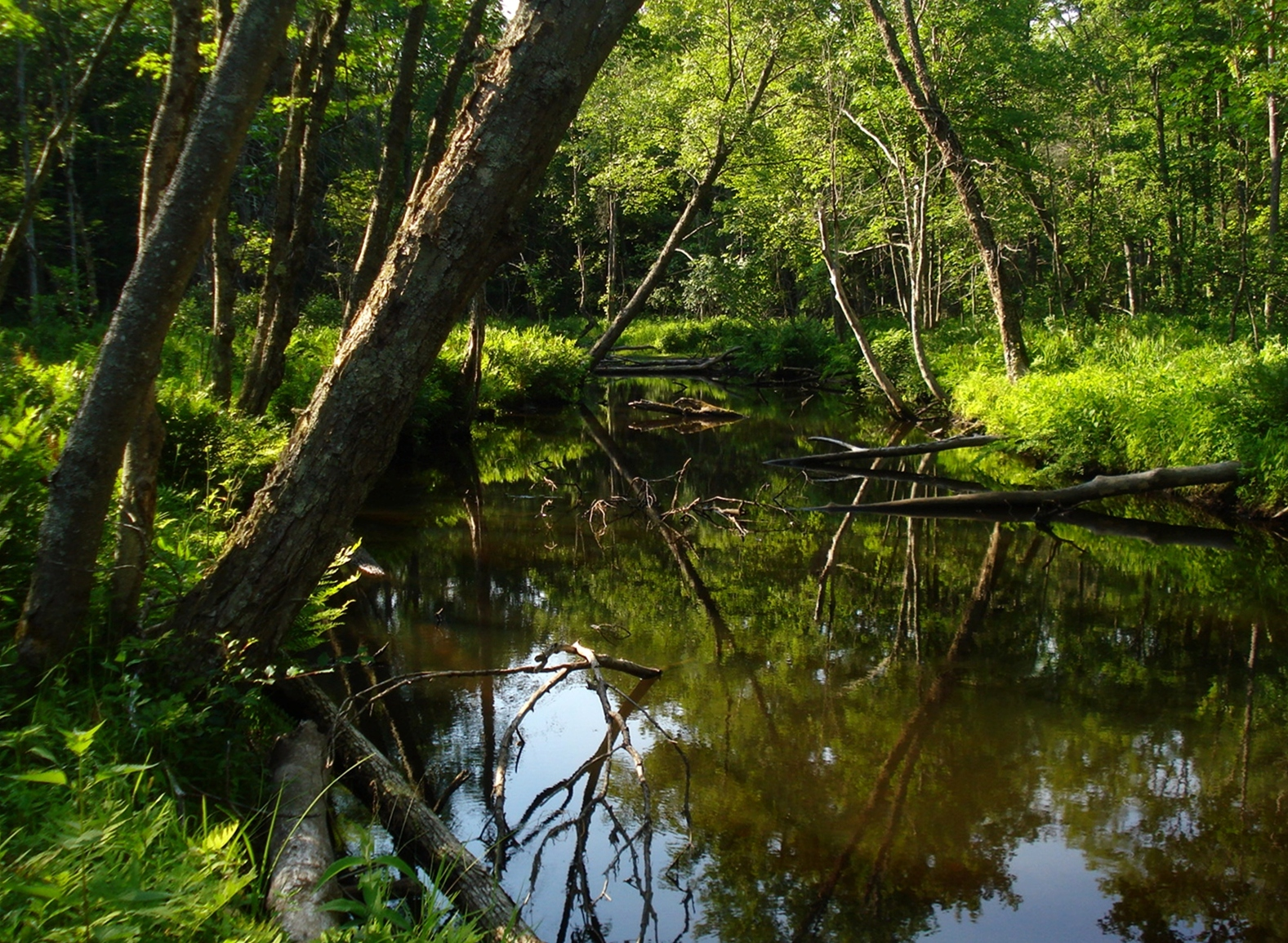
Stream and forest at Happy Valley Wildlife Management Area in Oswego County, New York.

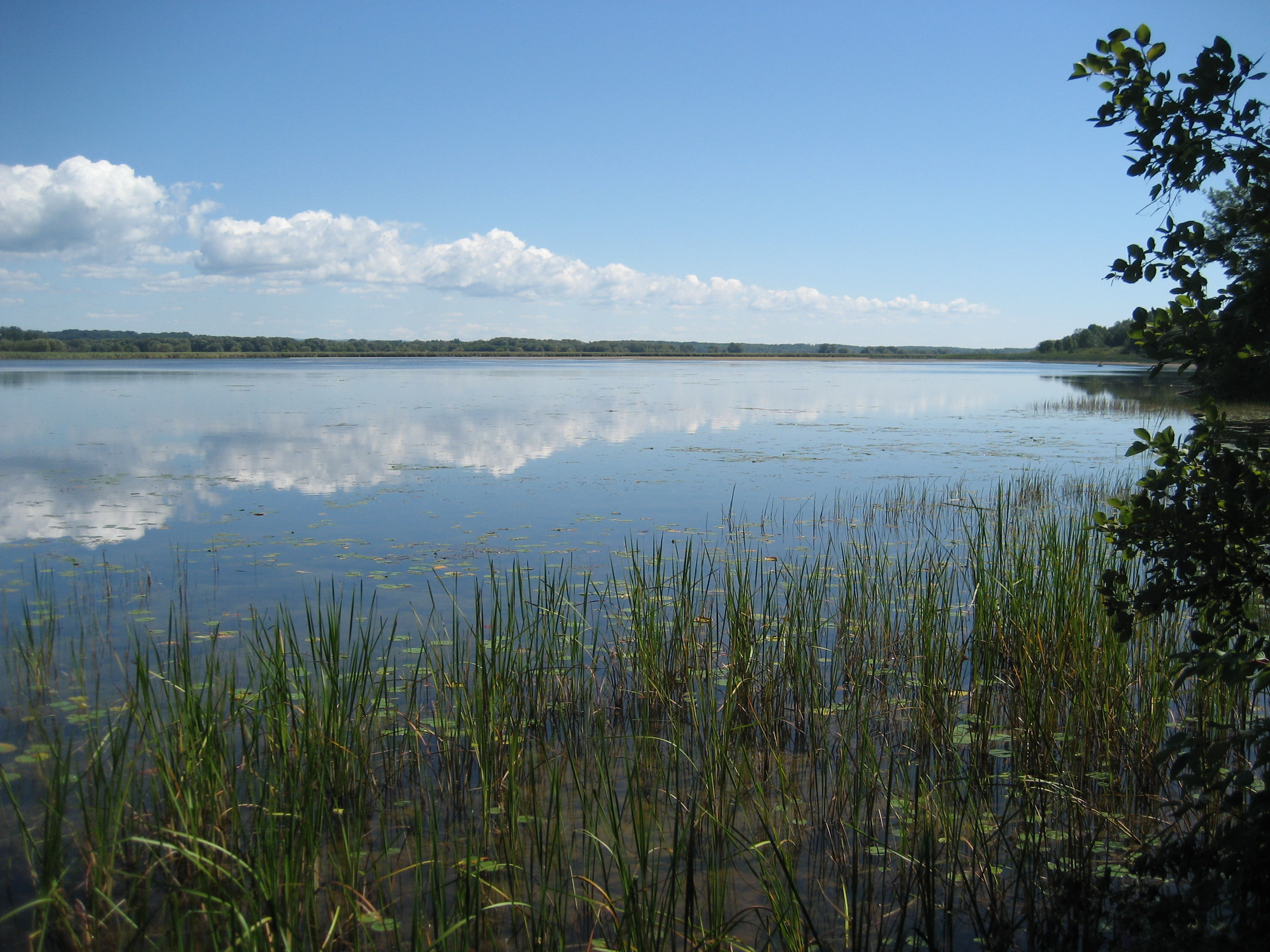
View of Lakeview Pond within Lakeview Wildlife Management Area

New York State Wildlife Management Areas (WMAs) are conservation areas managed by the New York State Department of Environmental Conservation (NYSDEC) primarily for the benefit of wildlife, and used extensively by the public for hunting, fishing, and trapping. As of 2016, the NYSDEC owns and maintains 113 WMAs, with a total area of approximately 197,000 acres (308 sq mi; 800 km^{2}). The Wildlife Management Areas program is administered by the Division of Fish, Wildlife and Marine Resources of the NYSDEC.

== History ==
The first source of funding for New York's Wildlife Management Areas was the Conservation Fund of the Division, which was begun in 1925. It accumulates hunting, fishing, and trapping license fees and other miscellaneous fees and fines collected by the Division. In the 1930s, the federal Resettlement Administration bought marginal and worn-out farmland and later donated it to the state for wildlife management purposes. The Pittman–Robertson Federal Aid in Wildlife Restoration Act of 1937 places an excise tax on guns and ammunition, of which 10% is returned to the states to fund restoration and management efforts for wildlife including purchase of habitat. New York State Bond Acts in 1960, 1972 and 1986 have also helped fund the WMA system.

Some of the WMAs occupy land that is environmentally sensitive. Thus the Lakeview Wildlife Management Area has been declared the Lakeview Marsh and Barrier Beach National Natural Landmark, and was cited in 1973 as, "One of the best and most extensive marshlands that lie in protected bays and behind barrier beaches along eastern Lake Ontario."

== List of New York State Wildlife Management Areas ==
Name	County or counties	Area	Notes
Alder Bottom	Chautauqua	818 acres (3.31 km^{2})	
Allegheny Reservoir	Cattaraugus	1,100 acres (4.5 km^{2})	
Ashland Flats	Jefferson	2,037 acres (8.24 km^{2})	
Ausable Marsh	Clinton	576 acres (2.33 km^{2})	
Bashakill	Sullivan	2,213 acres (8.96 km^{2})	
Baxtertown Woods	Dutchess	250 acres (1.0 km^{2})	
Bear Spring Mountain	Delaware	7,186 acres (29.08 km^{2})	
Black Pond	Jefferson	526 acres (2.13 km^{2})	Part of the "Eastern Lake Ontario Barrier Beach and Wetland Complex" New York Natural Heritage Area.
Bog Brook	Putnam	132 acres (0.53 km^{2})	
Braddock Bay	Monroe	2,402 acres (9.72 km^{2})	
Canadaway Creek	Chautauqua	2,080 acres (8.4 km^{2})	
Canoga Marsh	Seneca	104 acres (0.42 km^{2})	Protects marshland along the western shore of Cayuga Lake.
Capital District	Rensselaer	4,153 acres (16.81 km^{2})	
Carters Pond	Washington	446 acres (1.80 km^{2})	
Carlton Hill	Wyoming	2,484 acres (10.05 km^{2})	
Catharine Creek	Schuyler	660 acres (2.7 km^{2})	
Cayuga Lake	Seneca	225 acres (0.91 km^{2})	
Chautauqua Lake	Chautauqua	123 acres (0.50 km^{2})	
Cherry Island	Orange	14 acres (0.057 km^{2})	Protects an island within the upper Delaware River.
Cicero Swamp	Onondaga	4,947 acres (20.02 km^{2})	
Clay Pond	Chautauqua	182 acres (0.74 km^{2})	
Cold Brook	Steuben	125 acres (0.51 km^{2})	
Collins Landing	Jefferson	44 acres (0.18 km^{2})	
Conesus Inlet	Livingston	1,220 acres (4.9 km^{2})	
Conewango Swamp	Cattaraugus	900 acres (3.6 km^{2})	
Connecticut Hill	Schuyler, Tompkins	11,161 acres (45.17 km^{2})	
Cranberry Creek	Jefferson	13 acres (0.053 km^{2})	
Cranberry Mountain	Putnam	467 acres (1.89 km^{2})	
Cross Lake Islands	Cayuga, Onondaga	27 acres (0.11 km^{2})	
Crumhorn Mountain	Otsego		
Currans Road Pond	Suffolk		
Curtiss Gale	Oswego	47 acres (0.19 km^{2})	
Deer Creek Marsh	Oswego	1,770 acres (7.2 km^{2})	Part of the "Eastern Lake Ontario Barrier Beach and Wetland Complex" New York Natural Heritage Area.
Dexter Marsh	Jefferson	1,339 acres (5.42 km^{2})	
East Bay	Washington	38 acres (0.15 km^{2})	
Erwin	Steuben	2,500 acres (10 km^{2})	
Fish Creek	St. Lawrence	4,438 acres (17.96 km^{2})	
Franklinton Vlaie	Schoharie	185 acres (0.75 km^{2})	
French Creek	Jefferson	2,265 acres (9.17 km^{2})	
Frenchman's Island	Onondaga, Oswego	28 acres (0.11 km^{2})	Formerly operated as the undeveloped Frenchman Island State Park. Transferred to NYSDEC in 2011, and now part of Three Mile Bay WMA.
Galen	Wayne	712 acres (2.88 km^{2})	
Genesee Valley	Allegany	717 acres (2.90 km^{2})	
Great Baehre Swamp	Erie	271 acres (1.10 km^{2})	
Great Swamp	Putnam	444 acres (1.80 km^{2})	
Great Vly	Greene, Ulster	184 acres (0.74 km^{2})	
Hamlin Marsh	Onondaga	1,689 acres (6.84 km^{2})	
Hampton Brook Woods	Erie	61 acres (0.25 km^{2})	
Hanging Bog	Allegany	4,571 acres (18.50 km^{2})	
Happy Valley	Oswego	8,895 acres (36.00 km^{2})	
Hartland Swamp	Niagara	385 acres (1.56 km^{2})	
Hartson Swamp	Chautauqua	98 acres (0.40 km^{2})	
Helmer Creek	Steuben	126 acres (0.51 km^{2})	
High Tor	Ontario, Yates	6,200 acres (25 km^{2})	
Honeoye Creek	Ontario	717 acres (2.90 km^{2})	
Honeoye Inlet	Ontario	1,981 acres (8.02 km^{2})	
Honeyville	Jefferson	111 acres (0.45 km^{2})	
Hooker Mountain	Otsego		
Indian River	Jefferson	968 acres (3.92 km^{2})	
Jacquins Pond	Chautauqua	30 acres (0.12 km^{2})	
John White	Genesee	339 acres (1.37 km^{2})	Formerly managed by New York State as the "John White Memorial Game Farm" between 1945 and 2000 for the purpose of raising pheasants for release on public hunting lands.
Kabob	Chautauqua	38 acres (0.15 km^{2})	
Keeney Swamp	Allegany	708 acres (2.87 km^{2})	
Kings Bay	Clinton	653 acres (2.64 km^{2})	
Lake Alice	Clinton	1,468 acres (5.94 km^{2})	
Lake Ontario Islands	Jefferson, St. Lawrence	64 acres (0.26 km^{2})	Protects the 43-acre (17 ha) Little Galloo Island, the one-acre (0.40 ha) Gull Island, and a 20-acre (8.1 ha) portion of Galloo Island.
Lake Shore Marshes	Wayne	6,130 acres (24.8 km^{2})	
Lakeview	Jefferson	3,461 acres (14.01 km^{2})	Part of the "Eastern Lake Ontario Barrier Beach and Wetland Complex" New York Natural Heritage Area.
Lewis Preserve	Clinton	1,356 acres (5.49 km^{2})	
Little John	Oswego	7,918 acres (32.04 km^{2})	
Louise E. Keir	Albany	119 acres (0.48 km^{2})	
Margaret Burke	Albany	246 acres (1.00 km^{2})	
Mongaup Valley	Sullivan	11,855 acres (47.98 km^{2})	
Monty's Bay	Clinton	287 acres (1.16 km^{2})	
Motor Island	Erie	6 acres (0.024 km^{2})	
Northern Montezuma	Seneca, Wayne, Cayuga	7,500 acres (30 km^{2})	
Oak Orchard	Genesee	2,545 acres (10.30 km^{2})	
Oriskany Flats	Oneida	750 acres (3.0 km^{2})	
Otis Pike Preserve	Suffolk	4,000 acres (16 km^{2})	
Parcel 45	Saratoga	59 acres (0.24 km^{2})	
Partridge Run	Albany	4,594 acres (18.59 km^{2})	
Pauline Murdock	Essex	68 acres (0.28 km^{2})	
Perch River	Jefferson	7,862 acres (31.82 km^{2})	
Pharsalia	Chenango	4,694 acres (19.00 km^{2})	
Plantation Island	Herkimer	300 acres (1.2 km^{2})	
Point Peninsula	Jefferson	1,054 acres (4.27 km^{2})	
Putts Creek	Essex	114 acres (0.46 km^{2})	
Rattlesnake Hill	Livingston, Allegany	5,150 acres (20.8 km^{2})	
Roger's Island	Columbia	281 acres (1.14 km^{2})	
Rome	Oneida	436 acres (1.76 km^{2})	
Saratoga Sand Plains	Saratoga	735 acres (2.97 km^{2})	
Silver Lake	Wyoming	10 acres (0.040 km^{2})	
Spicer Creek	Erie	34 acres (0.14 km^{2})	
Stid Hill	Ontario	847 acres (3.43 km^{2})	
Stockport	Columbia	357 acres (1.44 km^{2})	
Three Mile Bay	Oswego	3,495 acres (14.14 km^{2})	Incorporates Frenchman's Island.
Three Rivers	Onondaga	3,586 acres (14.51 km^{2})	
Tillman Road	Erie	230 acres (0.93 km^{2})	
Tioughnioga	Madison	3,803 acres (15.39 km^{2})	
Tivoli Bays	Dutchess	1,722 acres (6.97 km^{2})	Designated as a "New York Natural Heritage Area" in 2007.
Tonawanda	Genesee, Orleans, Niagara	5,600 acres (23 km^{2})	
Tug Hill	Lewis	5,114 acres (20.70 km^{2})	
Upper and Lower Lakes	St. Lawrence	8,782 acres (35.54 km^{2})	
Utica Marsh	Oneida	213 acres (0.86 km^{2})	
Victory Mills	Saratoga	47 acres (0.19 km^{2})	
Vinegar Hill	Greene	394 acres (1.59 km^{2})	
Waneta-Lamoka	Schuyler	157 acres (0.64 km^{2})	
Watt's Flats	Chautauqua	1,382 acres (5.59 km^{2})	
West Cameron	Steuben	170 acres (0.69 km^{2})	
Whitney Point	Broome, Cortland	4,645 acres (18.80 km^{2})	
Wickham Marsh	Essex	862 acres (3.49 km^{2})	
Willard	Seneca	158 acres (0.64 km^{2})	
Wilson Hill	St. Lawrence	3,441 acres (13.93 km^{2})	
Wolf Hollow	Delaware	52 acres (0.21 km^{2})	
Young's Island	Suffolk		

== See also ==
- New York State Forests
- List of National Wildlife Refuges in New York
