= Tonawanda Wildlife Management Area =

New York State wildlife management area

- Location within New York
- Location: New York, United States
- Coordinates: 43°06′58″N 78°28′26″W
- Area: 5,600 acres (23 km^{2})

The Tonawanda Wildlife Management Area is a 5,600-acre (23 km^{2}) wildlife management area (WMA) located in western New York State. It is located primarily within Niagara County and Genesee County, with a small portion within Orleans County. It is managed by the New York State Department of Environmental Conservation.

Along with the adjacent Iroquois National Wildlife Refuge to the east and the Oak Orchard Wildlife Management Area farther to the east, Tonawanda WMA contributes to a continuous 19,000-acre (77 km^{2}) region dedicated to conservation and wildlife management known as the Alabama Swamp Complex. Approximately 100,000 migratory birds pass through the area each year.

== History ==
The wildlife management area is located in a swampy area that has historically been a stopping point for migratory wildfowl. The area was hunted by Native Americans and early settlers.

The land was purchased by New York State to protect the wildlife from over-hunting using funds from duck stamps and taxes on firearms and ammunition. The stated objectives of the WMA are increased waterfowl production, waterfowl protection, and flood control.

== Geography ==
Tonawanda WMA lies about halfway between Buffalo and Rochester. It lies halfway between the Village of Akron to the south and the Village of Middleport to the north.

The Tonawanda WMA consists of 5,600 acres (23 km^{2}), consisting primarily of wetlands. The WMA is on a floodplain of the Tonawanda Creek. Water retention is facilitated by impoundments, which increase wetland area and control flooding in nearby inhabited areas.

NY Route 77, Lewiston Road, passes through the north part of the WMA. The south boundary of part of Tonawanda WMA is the Tonawanda Indian Reservation.

The WMA is located adjacent to the Iroquois National Wildlife Refuge and the Oak Orchard Wildlife Management Area, both located east of the Tonawanda WMA. Located several miles north is the 401-acre (162 ha) Hartland Swamp Wildlife Management Area in the Town of Hartland. The former John White Memorial Game Farm, located south of the community of Alabama on NY-77 at the junction with NY-63, is also available for public use.

== Public use ==
Hunting, fishing, hiking, bird watching and snowshoeing is permitted at Tonawanda WMA. Trapping is also allowed via permits assigned by lottery. Prohibited activities include the use of motorized vehicles (except in parking areas), and the use of motorized boats. Camping is available only to groups with a permit.

Except for Bartel Road and Meadville Road, both of which pass through the WMA, all other roads are unpaved and reserved for official use. Pedestrian traffic in the WMA uses these roads and other paths along the dikes, which divides the WMA into separate marshes. Two observation areas with ample parking and public information are located along Lewiston Road.

== See also ==
- List of New York state wildlife management areas
