= Oak Orchard Wildlife Management Area =

Wildlife Management Area located in Western New York

- Location within New York
- Location: New York, United States
- Coordinates: 43°07′23″N 78°17′49″W
- Area: 2,500 acres (10 km^{2})

The Oak Orchard Wildlife Management Area is an approximately 2,500-acre (10 km^{2}) wildlife management area (WMA) located in western New York, United States. Most of this conservation area is in the northwest part of Genesee County, with a small northern portion in Orleans County.

The Oak Orchard Swamp, which is the heart of the conservation area, is formed by a natural obstruction to the flow of Oak Orchard Creek. Oak Orchard WMA, along with the Iroquois National Wildlife Refuge and the Tonawanda Wildlife Management Area farther to the west, helps form a continuous conservation and management zone, the Alabama Swamp Complex, covering part of three counties.

== Geography ==
The Oak Orchard WMA is located about halfway between Buffalo and Rochester. It is north of the Village of Oakfield.

The western boundary is marked by Knowlesville Road, which separates the WMA from Iroquois National Wildlife Refuge. The northern boundary is partly marked by Podunk Road and East Shelby Road. Albion Road passes through the eastern part of the WMA. No highway or other feature marks the south boundary.

== Public use ==
Most of the pedestrian traffic in the WMA is along the dikes that separate the wetland into discrete marshes. Except for unpaved roads reserved for official use, the only roadways through the area are a few local rural roads.

Permissible activities at Oak Orchard WMA include hunting, fishing, non-motorized boating, hiking and nature study, bird watching, cross-country skiing and snowshoeing. Photography is enhanced by blinds that are installed at some locations. An observation tower is located on Albion Road, and an education center is located on Knowlesville Road, which includes some picnicking facilities.

Trapping is also allowed via permits assigned by lottery, and dog training is permitted within state regulations. Camping is available only to groups with a permit.

Prohibited activities include the use of motorized vehicles (except in parking areas), the use of motorized boats, and hunting of waterfowl in marked areas.

== See also ==
- List of New York state wildlife management areas
