= Tillman Road Wildlife Management Area =

Conservation area in New York State, U.S.

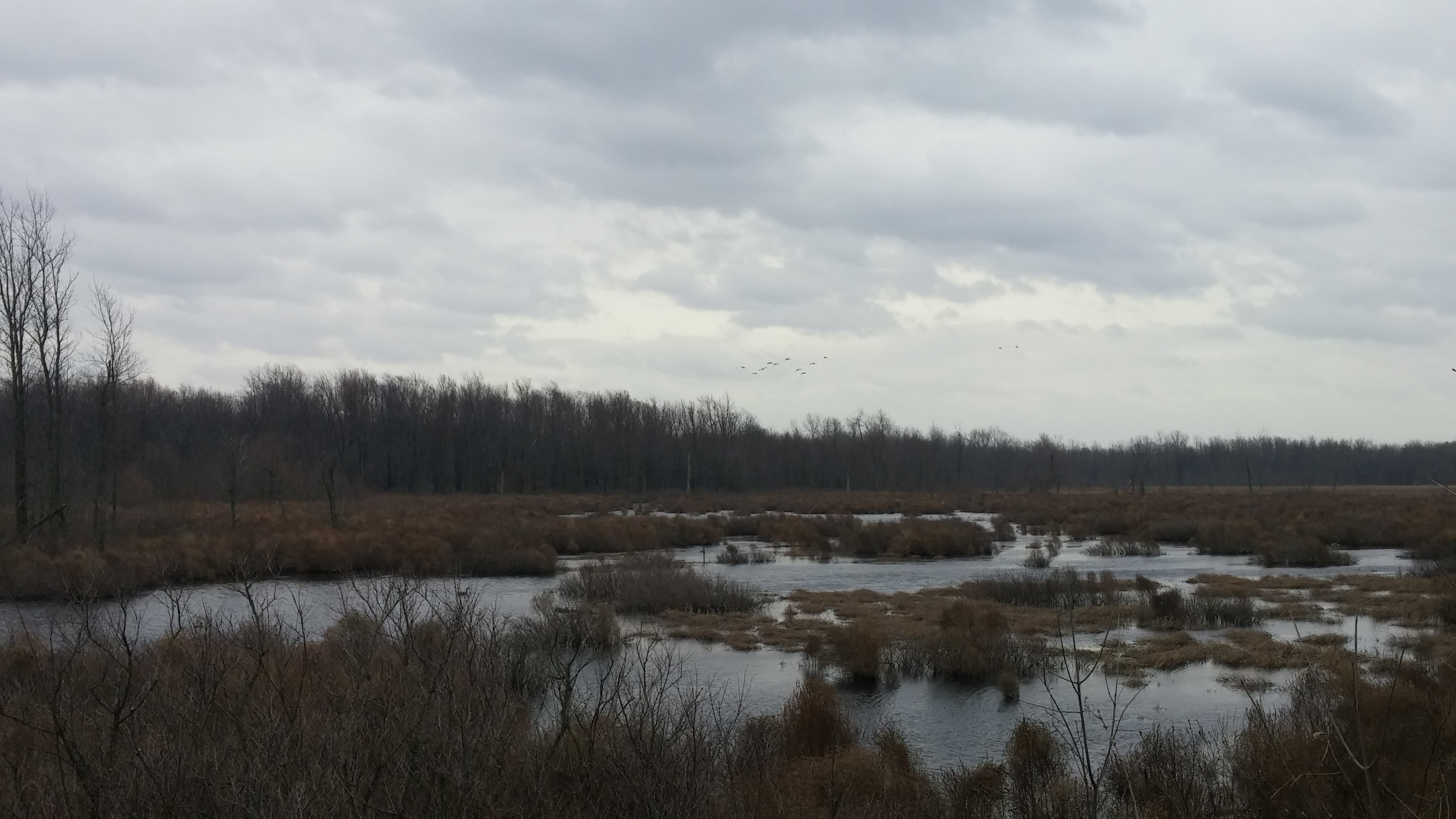

- Location within New York
- Type: State Wildlife Management Area
- Location: 9988 Wehrle Drive, Clarence, New York 14031
- Nearest city: Buffalo, New York
- Coordinates: 42°57′56″N 78°36′32″W
- Area: 235 acres (95 ha)
- Operator: New York State Department of Environmental Conservation
- Website: www.dec.ny.gov/outdoor/83201.html

Tillman Road Wildlife Management Area is a 235-acre (0.95 km^{2}) conservation area located within the Town of Clarence in Erie County, western New York. It is managed by the New York State Department of Environmental Conservation.

== Geography ==
Tillman Road Wildlife Management Area (WMA) contains approximately 235 acres (0.95 km^{2}), including an 80-acre (32 ha) cattail swamp.

The Tillman Road site is located in the southeast part of Clarence, south of NY-5 (Main Street) and north of the New York State Thruway. Tillman Road is located in the eastern projection of Wildlife Management Unit 9C.

== Geology ==
The WMA is located inside the bounds of a buried valley which extends from the Onondaga escarpment near Clarence to the north, and continues to the south. When the nearby Spaulding Lake quarry was active, a large vertical groundwater joint extending from the WMA to the Onondaga escarpment in a northwest direction was accidentally hit. Groundwater flooded the quarry and the inflow was too great to be pumped out, forcing the quarry to be abandoned.

== Public use ==
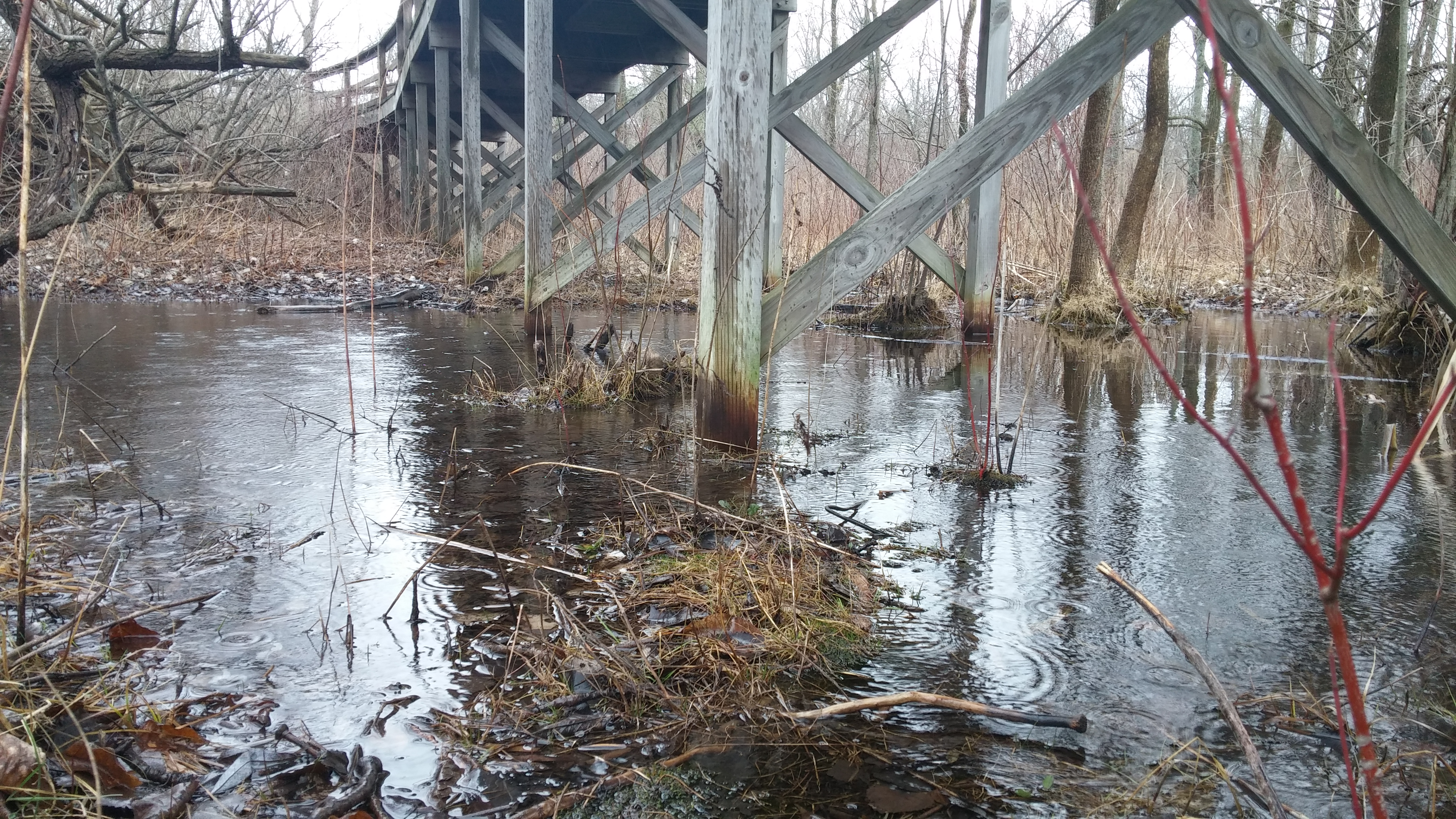
The boardwalk at the WMA.

The WMA is bisected by Tillman Road, where one centrally located parking area is located. A second parking area is located on Bergtold Road at the north end of the preserve.

The preserve is crossed by several trails, including two loops of different lengths. A short section of boardwalk and a viewing platform are located by Bergtold Road. Parts of some trails are elevated on narrow boardwalks due to marshy conditions.

Permissible activities within the WMA include hiking, nature observation, photography, fishing, snowshoeing, and cross country skiing.

== See also ==
- List of New York state wildlife management areas
