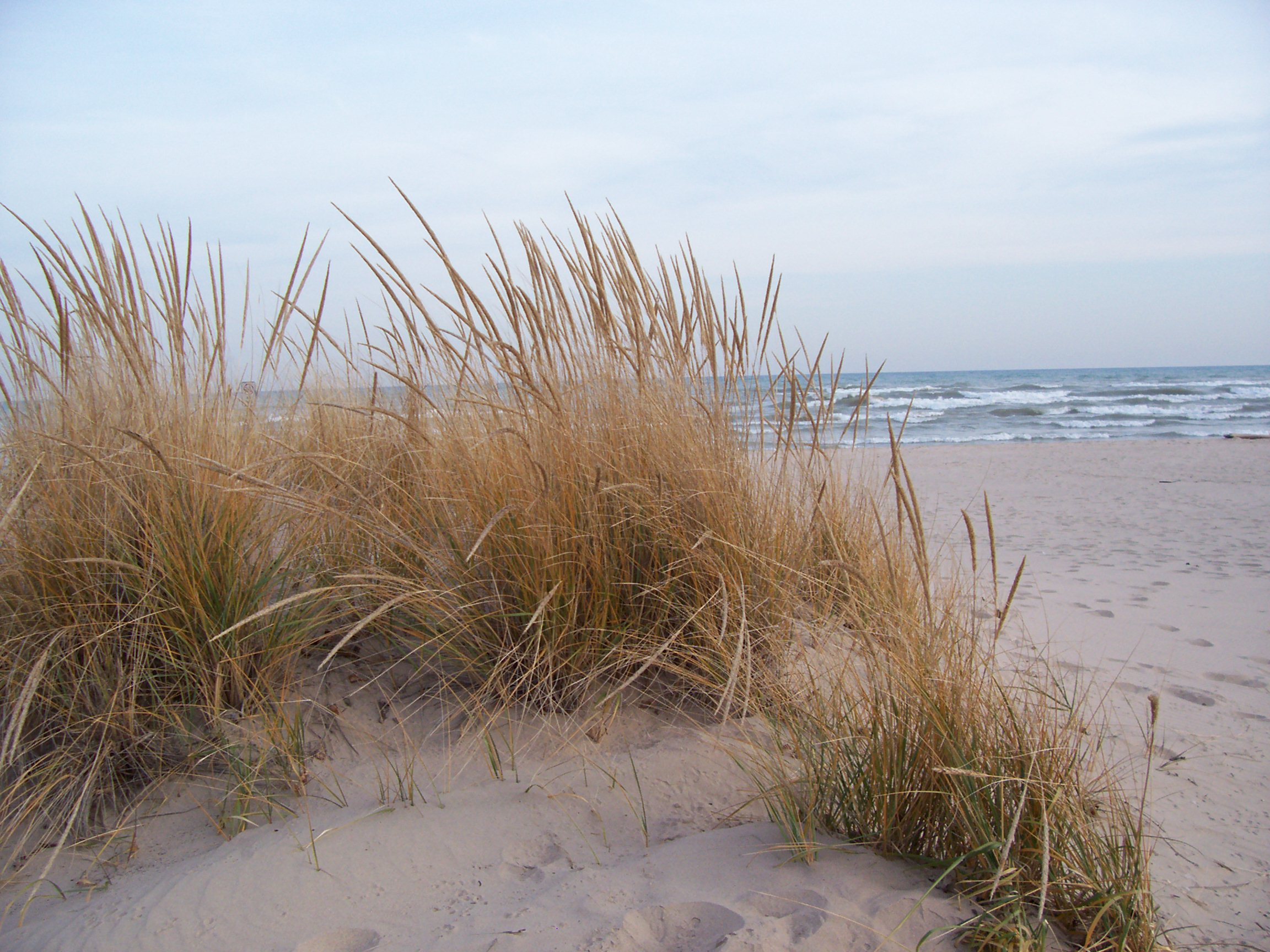
- American beachgrass in Kohler-Andrae State Park on Lake Michigan in November; note the seed heads rising above the leaves.

Scientific classification
- Kingdom: Plantae
- Clade: Tracheophytes
- Clade: Angiosperms
- Clade: Monocots
- Clade: Commelinids
- Order: Poales
- Family: Poaceae
- Genus: Ammophila
- Species: A. breviligulata

Binomial name
- Ammophila breviligulata Fern.

= Ammophila breviligulata =

American beachgrass

Species of flowering plant in the grass family

Ammophila breviligulata (American beachgrass or American marram grass) is a species of grass native to eastern North America, where it grows on sand dunes along the Atlantic Ocean and Great Lakes coasts. Beachgrass thrives under conditions of shifting sand, sand burial, and high winds; it is a dune-building grass that builds the first line of sand dunes along the coast. Beachgrass is less vigorous in stabilized sand, and is only infrequently found further inland than the coastal foredunes. On the Atlantic coastline of North America, Ammophila breviligulata has been observed as far south as North Carolina, and is often planted in dune restoration projects. Ammophila breviligulata was introduced to the Pacific coast of North America in the 1930s. It is proving to be invasive, and is increasingly important to coastal ecology and development in Oregon, Washington, and British Columbia.

== Description ==
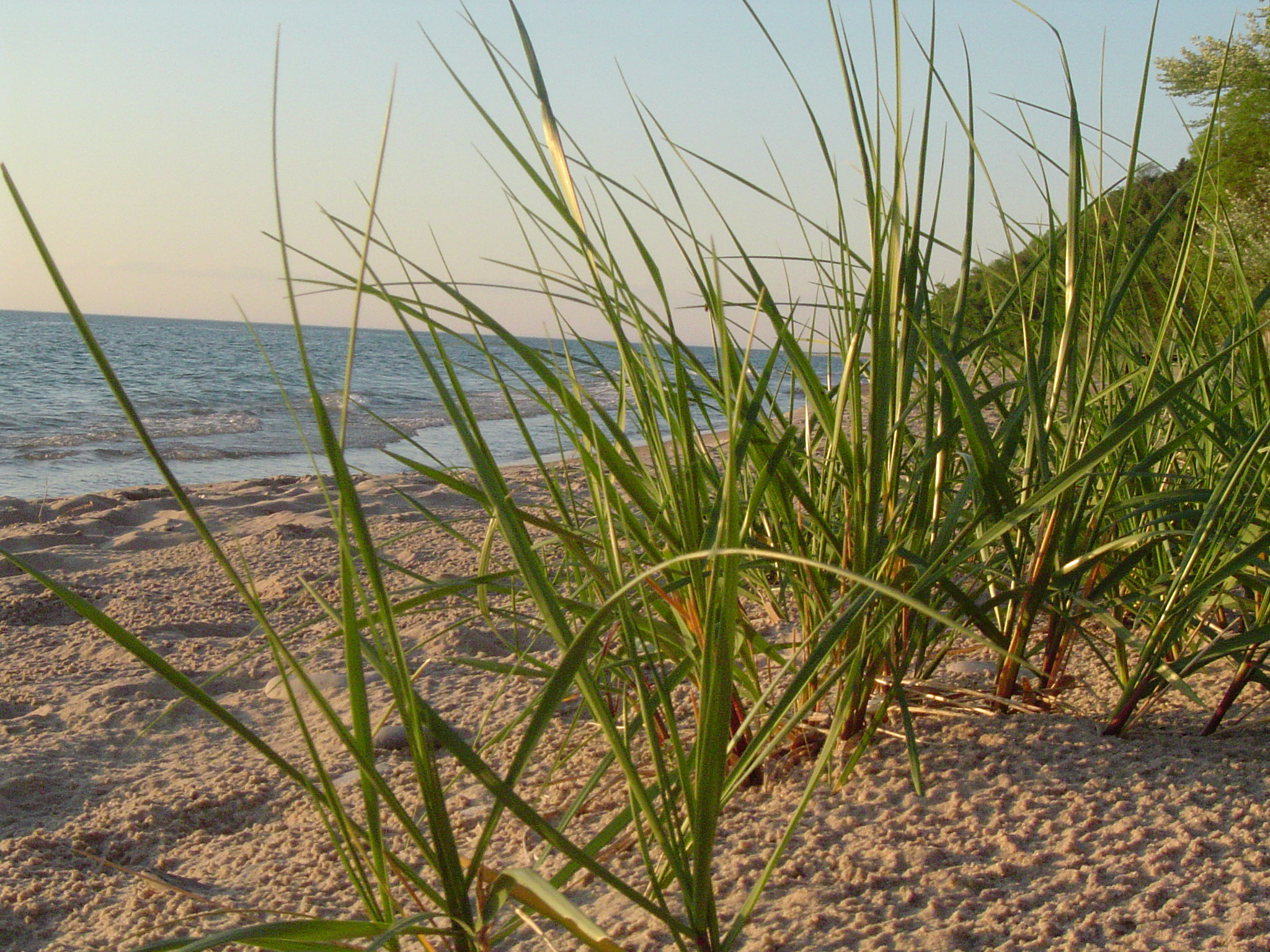
American beachgrass on Lake Michigan in Spring

Ammophila breviligulata is perennial grass which produces an extensive rhizome system. The leaves have deeply furrowed upper surfaces and smooth undersides, and grow 1 to 3 feet (0.3 to 0.9 m) tall. The plant's inflorescence is a spike-like panicle that can reach 10 inches (25 cm) long; The spikelet is single-flowered, awnless. The seed head appears in late July or August. The species name breviligulata derives from the Latin brevis ("short") and ligula ("tongue"), which refers to a feature of grass leaves called the ligule.

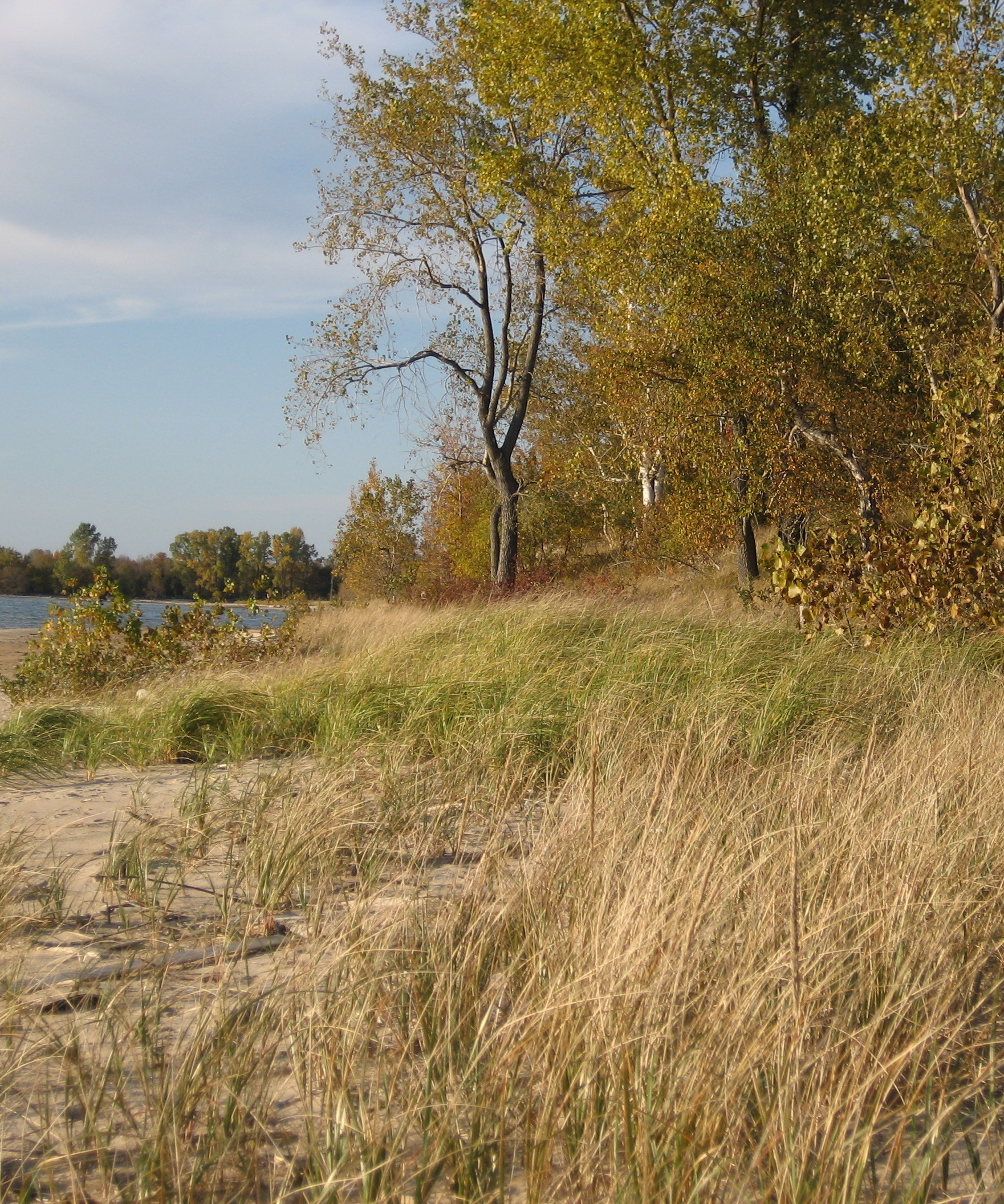
Two varieties of American beachgrass growing on the eastern shore of Lake Ontario. The greener stand in the distance is Cape variety, and has been introduced to this area; it is native to the Atlantic Ocean coasts of North America. The browner stand in the foreground is the native "Champlain beachgrass" (sometimes considered a separate species A. champlainensis).

Ammophila breviligulata is quite similar in appearance and ecology to a second species of beachgrass, Ammophila arenaria (European beachgrass). As Nick Page has summarized, "Ammophila breviligulata is distinguished from A. arenaria by smaller ligules (1–3 mm versus 10–30 mm long in A. arenaria), wider and less inrolled leaves, longer flower spike (25–35 cm versus 15–25 cm long in A. arenaria), and scaly rather than puberulent leaf veins on the upper leaf surface."

== Ecology ==
Both species of beachgrass are noted for their association with stable sand dunes, and observations in regions where they were introduced to coasts indicate that they build the first line of dunes on coasts (the foredunes). The plants spread rapidly – 6 to 10 feet (1.8 to 3.0 m) annually – through the sand by subsurface runners (rhizomes), and can produce up to 100 stems per clump annually. They can tolerate burial in as much as 3 feet (0.9 m) of sand; sand burial stimulates the rhizomes to grow vertically, and is essential to plant vigor. The beachgrass species are also very good examples of xerophytes, being able to thrive on arid to semi-arid beach dunes. The plant has several mechanisms for adapting to heat stress or wind. The long narrow leaves can roll or fold, and the rough upper leaf surface, which contains the gas exchange openings (stomata), can orient itself away from the wind.

Beachgrass is a dominant species on foredunes, and is sometimes the only plant found there, but is unable to grow farther inland on stabilized dunes and soil. One reason for this that has been extensively studied by Wim van der Putten and his colleagues is based on the susceptibility of Ammophila species to soil pathogens such as nematodes. The density of these pathogens is low in freshly deposited sand, but builds up in the roots of beachgrass on stabilized sand. While the details are complex, the result is that beachgrass is largely limited to the foredunes that it builds, which are immediately adjacent to the water's edge and where sand is removed and redeposited fairly frequently.

Around the Great Lakes, it is limited to active dune habitats along the shores, and it is listed a threatened species in Minnesota where it reaches its most westerly natural range around Duluth.

== Invasiveness ==
Starting in the 19th century, A. arenaria was introduced to the Pacific coast of North America to help control beach sands; it serves this role so well that it is now considered invasive not only along this coast (from California north to British Columbia), but along nearly every coast worldwide where it has been introduced. Ammophila arenaria built foredunes (the dunes closest to the beach) that are typically about 14 feet (4.3 m) high, which is much higher than the dunes associated with the native dune grass species Leymus mollis.

In the 1930s, A. breviligulata was introduced to about 3,000 acres (1,200 ha) on the Clatsop Peninsula in Oregon. Since then, A. breviligulata has gradually supplanted A. arenaria in Oregon and Washington; the precise reason for the relative success of A. breviligulata isn't known. The most recognizable aspect of the changeover between the beachgrass species is that the foredunes of A. breviligulata are shorter than the foredunes of A. arenaria; foredunes of A. breviligulata are about 9 feet (2.7 m) high in this region. The diversity of other species that co-exist with mature stands of A. arenaria is comparable to the species diversity with A. breviligulata. However, the lower foredune height for the latter means that coastal ecosystems that had adapted to the fairly tall foredunes of A. arenaria are again changing, especially in the regions just behind the foredune and sheltered by it. Similarly, buildings and roads that were constructed under the presumption of continuing protection by the tall A. arenaria foredunes may now be threatened by shifting sand and by increased exposure to wind and water in storms.
