= Fabius, New York =

- Town
- Location in Onondaga County and the state of New York.

- Location of New York in the United States
- Coordinates: 42°50′5″N 75°59′5″W
- Country: United States
- State: New York
- County: Onondaga

Government
  - Town Supervisor: Michael L. Vilardi (R)
  - Town Council: Members: Peter Schlicht (R); Debbie Foster (R); Barry E. Ellis (R); James P. Conway (R)

Area
  - Total: 46.77 sq mi (121.14 km^{2})
  - Land: 46.50 sq mi (120.43 km^{2})
  - Water: 0.27 sq mi (0.71 km^{2})

Population (2020)
  - Total: 2,006
  - Density: 43.14/sq mi (16.66/km^{2})
- Time zone: UTC-5 (EST)
  - Summer (DST): UTC-4 (EDT)
- ZIP Codes: 13063 (Fabius); 13020 (Apulia Station); 13052 (De Ruyter); 13084 (La Fayette); 13122 (New Woodstock); 13158 (Truxton); 13159 (Tully)
- FIPS code: 36-067-24878
- Website: townoffabius.com

Fabius is a town in Onondaga County, New York, United States. As of the 2020 Census, the population was 2,006. The classical name of the town was assigned by a clerk interested in the classics.

The Town of Fabius contains a village of Fabius. It is in the southeastern part of the county, south of Syracuse.

== History ==
The region was part of the Central New York Military Tract used to pay soldiers of the American Revolution. The town was formed in 1798 from Pompey and was one of the original townships in the Military Tract established in 1790. Fabius is named for the Roman general Quintus Fabius Maximus Verrucosus.

Fabius lost territory to the new towns of Tully (1806) and Truxton (1808 on the formation of Cortland County). The town of Fabius and some of the town's 1950s landmarks—the Fabius Central School and the famous Shea's General Store—are featured in the novel, The Pompey Hollow Book Club by Jerome Mark Antil.

== Geography ==
According to the United States Census Bureau, the town has a total area of 46.8 square miles (121.2 km^{2}), of which 46.6 square miles (120.6 km^{2}) is land and 0.2 square mile (0.6 km^{2}) (0.51%) is water.

The southern town line is the border of Cortland County and the eastern town line is the border of Madison County.

New York State Route 91 is a north-south highway, which intersects New York State Route 80, an east-west highway at Fabius village.

== Demographics ==
Historical population
| Census | Pop. | Note | %± |
|---|---|---|---|
| 1820 | 2,123 | | — |
| 1830 | 3,071 | | 44.7% |
| 1840 | 2,562 | | −16.6% |
| 1850 | 2,410 | | −5.9% |
| 1860 | 2,305 | | −4.4% |
| 1870 | 2,047 | | −11.2% |
| 1880 | 2,069 | | 1.1% |
| 1890 | 1,717 | | −17.0% |
| 1900 | 1,686 | | −1.8% |
| 1910 | 1,557 | | −7.7% |
| 1920 | 1,285 | | −17.5% |
| 1930 | 1,252 | | −2.6% |
| 1940 | 1,346 | | 7.5% |
| 1950 | 1,432 | | 6.4% |
| 1960 | 1,565 | | 9.3% |
| 1970 | 1,607 | | 2.7% |
| 1980 | 1,811 | | 12.7% |
| 1990 | 1,760 | | −2.8% |
| 2000 | 1,974 | | 12.2% |
| 2010 | 1,964 | | −0.5% |
| 2020 | 2,006 | | 2.1% |
U.S. Decennial Census

As of the census of 2000, there were 1,974 people, 686 households, and 515 families residing in the town. The population density was 42.4 inhabitants per square mile (16.4/km^{2}). There were 779 housing units at an average density of 16.7 per square mile (6.4/km^{2}). The racial makeup of the town was 97.77% White, 0.46% Black or African American, 0.66% Native American, 0.25% Asian, 0.10% Pacific Islander, 0.05% from other races, and 0.71% from two or more races. Hispanic or Latino of any race were 1.57% of the population.

There were 686 households, out of which 40.7% had children under the age of 18 living with them, 65.2% were married couples living together, 7.7% had a female householder with no husband present, and 24.8% were non-families. 18.8% of all households were made up of individuals, and 6.7% had someone living alone who was 65 years of age or older. The average household size was 2.87 and the average family size was 3.30.

In the town, the population was spread out, with 29.9% under the age of 18, 6.8% from 18 to 24, 29.7% from 25 to 44, 25.2% from 45 to 64, and 8.3% who were 65 years of age or older. The median age was 37 years. For every 100 females, there were 97.6 males. For every 100 females age 18 and over, there were 99.6 males.

The median income for a household in the town was $52,663, and the median income for a family was $59,167. Males had a median income of $40,745 versus $28,036 for females. The per capita income for the town was $21,206. About 4.9% of families and 5.7% of the population were below the poverty line, including 7.7% of those under age 18 and 5.0% of those age 65 or over.

== Communities and locations in the Town of Fabius ==
- Apulia – A hamlet near the western town line on NY Route 80.
- Apulia Station – A location west of Apulia on NY-80.
- Cowles Settlement – A location at the southern town line, officially in Cortland County.
- De Ruyter Reservoir – A small western part of the reservoir is within the east town line.
- Fabius – The Village of Fabius on NY-80 and NY-91.
- Gooseville Corners – A location in the southeastern part of the town on NY-80.
- Highland Forest – A county park in the southeastern part of the town.
- Keeney – A hamlet at the southern town line, officially in Cortland County.
- Labrador Hollow Unique Area – A state-owned conservation area in the southwestern part of the town.
- Vincent Corners – A location near the eastern town line, west of Gooseville Corners.
