= Skaneateles Turnpike =

Major junctions
- West end: Cherry Valley Turnpike near Skaneateles, New York
- East end: Cherry Valley Turnpike in Richfield Springs, New York

Location
- Country: United States
- State: New York

Highway system
- New York Highways; Interstate; US; State; Reference; Parkways

The Skaneateles Turnpike was an east–west turnpike in central New York in the United States. It began east of the village of Skaneateles and ran east across southern Onondaga and Madison counties to Richfield Springs in northern Otsego County. The road began and ended at the Cherry Valley Turnpike, part of the Great Western Turnpike system, and largely paralleled the Cherry Valley Turnpike between Skaneateles and Richfield Springs. Most of the road is now county-maintained, but a handful of sections are now part of New York state touring routes.

== Route description ==
The Skaneateles Turnpike began at the Cherry Valley Turnpike in the hamlet of Clintonville, that at that time had a tavern and a large barn for the stagecoach horses, located about 4 miles (6.4 km) east of the village of Skaneateles in western Onondaga County. West of this point, the Cherry Valley Turnpike served Skaneateles and eventually connected to the Seneca Turnpike. The Skaneateles Turnpike headed generally southeastward from Clintonville, running along part of Otisco Lake before leaving the lake shore and taking a more easterly routing toward the village of Tully. From Tully, the road took on a slightly northeasterly alignment for 20 miles (32 km), passing through Fabius, New Woodstock, and Erieville on its way to Eaton.

At Eaton, the turnpike veered southeast to serve Hamilton before curving back to the northeast at East Hamilton. The remaining 25 miles (40 km) of the turnpike served only a handful of small hamlets, scattered across sparsely populated areas of modern Madison and Otsego counties. The largest of these were Brookfield in eastern Madison County and Leonardsville, a riverside community located just south of where the road crossed the Unadilla River. Past the river, the turnpike continued generally northeastward across the rural northwestern corner of Otsego County to the village of Richfield Springs, where it ended at the Cherry Valley Turnpike in the village center.

== History ==
The Skaneateles Turnpike was incorporated under the name "the President and Directors of the Hamilton and Scaneatelas Turnpike" on April 2, 1806. In 1807 the company was authorized to intersect the Great Western Turnpike (now U.S. Route 20) at any point east of the west branch of the Unadilla River. The connection was ultimately made at Richfield Springs.

In western Onondaga County, the turnpike is now New York State Route 174 (NY 174), County Route 124 (CR 124), and CR 23. From CR 23's east end in Tully to New Woodstock, Madison County, it is now NY 80. While NY 80 follows NY 13 south from New Woodstock, the turnpike's path heads east to West Eaton as CR 52. Here, NY 26 joins the road, only to leave 3 miles (4.8 km) to the east in Eaton. Between Eaton and Hamilton, the old road is Hamilton Hill Road and Eaton Street (CR 85). The remainder of the Skaneateles Turnpike between Hamilton and the Unadilla River is part of CR 70 and all of CR 72, CR 74, and CR 80. Across the river in Otsego County, the turnpike is now part of CR 21 and CR 25. A section between the two roads is locally maintained.

While most of the old turnpike is now known by other names, several sections still reference the turnpike in their road name. In Otsego County, CR 25 is named Old Skaneateles Turnpike while CR 21 and the town-maintained segment between CR 21 and CR 25 are named Skaneateles Turnpike. The turnpike's old name is also used for CR 80 in Madison County.

== See also ==
- List of county routes in Madison County, New York
- List of county routes in Onondaga County, New York
- List of county routes in Otsego County, New York
