= Bucktooth State Forest =

Forest in New York

Coordinates: 42°11′21.9″N 78°50′5.9″W

Bucktooth State Forest is in Cattaraugus County in western New York. It covers 2,248 acres (910 ha) of land in the towns of Little Valley, Napoli and Salamanca. The North Country National Scenic Trail passes through Bucktooth State Forest. Hiking, hunting, fishing, snowshoeing, and cross-country skiing are among activities available in the park. Wildlife includes white-tailed deer, skunk, red fox, mink, coyote, ruffed grouse, and turkey. A draft management plan has been created for the area.

West Finger Lakes Trail, a lean-to, and primitive camping site are in the area as well as roads. Connectivity has been an issue with seasonal and permanent access closures.

== See also ==
- Rock City State Forest
- McCarty Hill
- New York State Forests
