= New York State Route 91 =

State highway in central New York, US

New York State Route 91
- Map of central New York with NY 91 highlighted in red

Route information
- Maintained by NYSDOT
- Length: 23.77 mi (38.25 km)
- Existed: 1930–present

Major junctions
- South end: NY 13 in Truxton
- US 20 in Pompey
- North end: NY 173 in DeWitt

Location
- Country: United States
- State: New York
- Counties: Cortland, Onondaga

Highway system
- New York Highways; Interstate; US; State; Reference; Parkways
← I-90N	→ NY 92

New York State Route 91 (NY 91) is a north–south state highway in Central New York in the United States. The southern terminus of the route is located at an intersection with NY 13 in the Cortland County town of Truxton. Its northern terminus is located at a junction with NY 173 in the Onondaga County hamlet of Jamesville. In between, NY 91 serves the village of Fabius and the hamlet of Pompey, where it meets NY 80 and U.S. Route 20 (US 20), respectively.

NY 91 originally extended as far south as Cincinnatus and as far north as Bridgeport when it was assigned as part of the 1930 renumbering of state highways in New York. The route was truncated to its current northern terminus at Jamesville in the late 1930s and cut back to its modern southern terminus at Truxton in 1981. Most of NY 91's former routing northeast of Syracuse became NY 298 while the highway that NY 91 followed from Cincinnatus to Truxton is now maintained by Cortland County as County Route 600 (CR 600) and County Route 600A.

== Route description ==
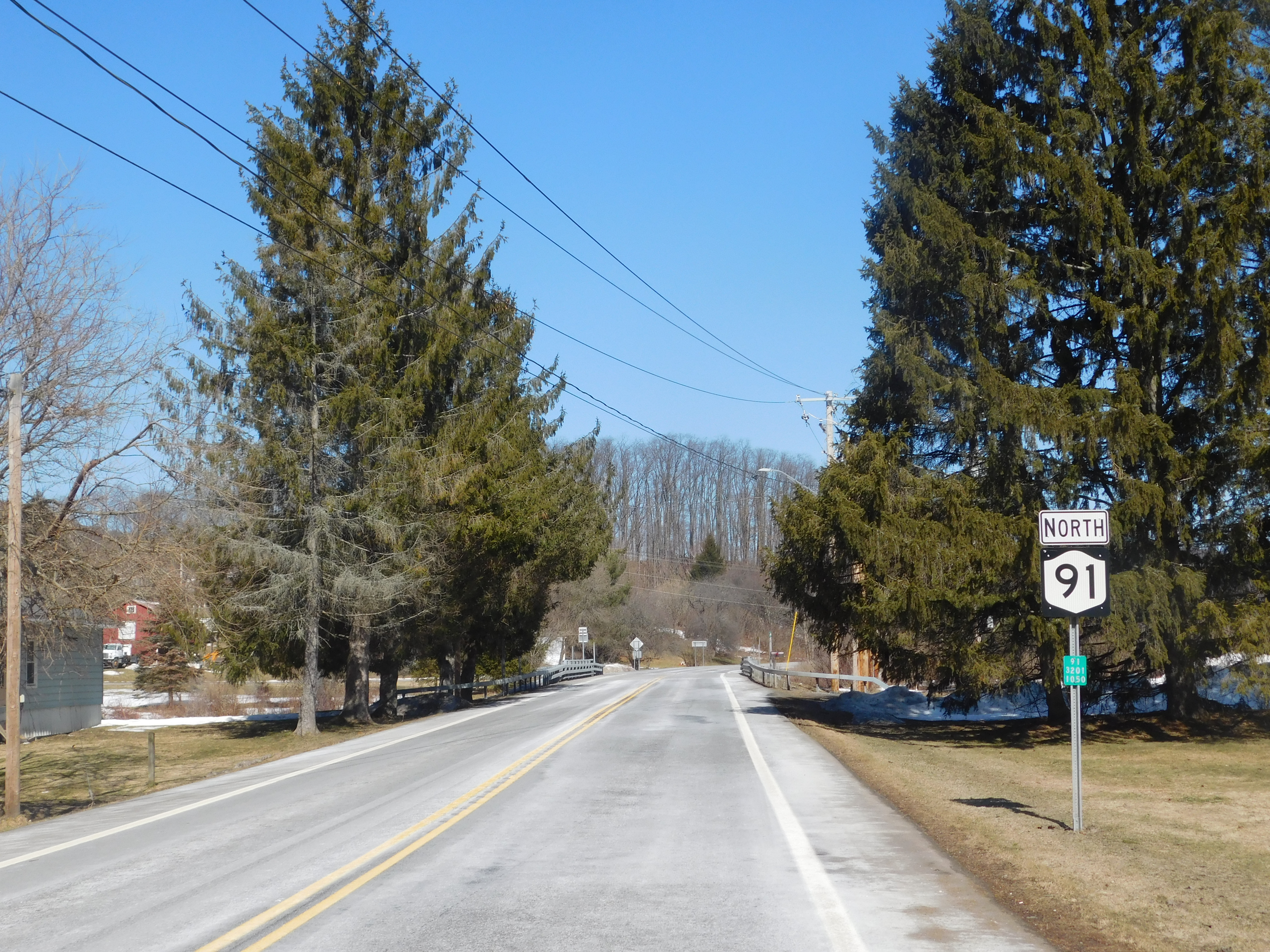
NY 91 northbound from the junction with NY 13 in Truxton

NY 91 begins at an intersection with NY 13 (Main Street) at the eastern end of the hamlet of Truxton. NY 91 proceeds north across and along Labrador Creek, crossing a junction with the terminus of County Route 151 (Prospect Street). Paralleling Labrador Creek and winds northward through the town of Truxton as a two-lane rural roadway, crossing northeast across the creek near Shackham Road. Turning northwest through the Labrador Hollow Unique Area, NY 91 begins paralleling the Labrador Pond and crosses the county line from Cortland County to Onondaga County. Now in the town of Fabius, NY 91 continues north past Labrador Crossover.

The rural roadway continues northeast through the town and soon becomes a local roadway along the fields in Onondaga County. Now entering the hamlet of Apulia, NY 91 reaches a junction with NY 80. NY 91 and NY 80 form a concurrency through Fabius, crossing a junction with the southern terminus of Berwyn Road (unsigned CR 114) The route remains rural as it runs eastward past the junction with Swift Road (CR 237). NY 80 and NY 91 enter the village of Fabius. Now known as Main Street, the two-lane road enters the village to the west, and at the junction with Mill Street, where NY 91 turns north and leaves out of the village.

Continuing through the town of Fabius, NY 91 remains the two-lane rural roadway, turning westward at a junction with Cemetery Road (CR 170). This western stint is short, with NY 91 turning north again at a junction with the eastern terminus of Chase Road (CR 237A). Now in the town of Pompey, NY 91 continues north into the hamlet of Pompey. In the center, NY 91 reaches a junction with US 20 and Cherry Street (CR 109 / CR 109A). Through downtown Pompey, the route remains primarily residential, soon leaving the hamlet.

Continuing northwest through the town of Pompey, the route runs along the northeastern edge of the Pompey Golf Club and soon reaches the Jamesville Beach County Park. Running northwest, NY 91 runs just east of the Jamesville Reservoir, soon reaching the hamlet of Jamesville. Passing northbound,. NY 91 and CR 2 (South Street) parallel each other along Butternut Creek. A short distance later, both routes reach respective junctions with NY 173 (East Seneca Turnpike) in the town of De Witt. This junction marks the northern terminus of NY 91.

== History ==
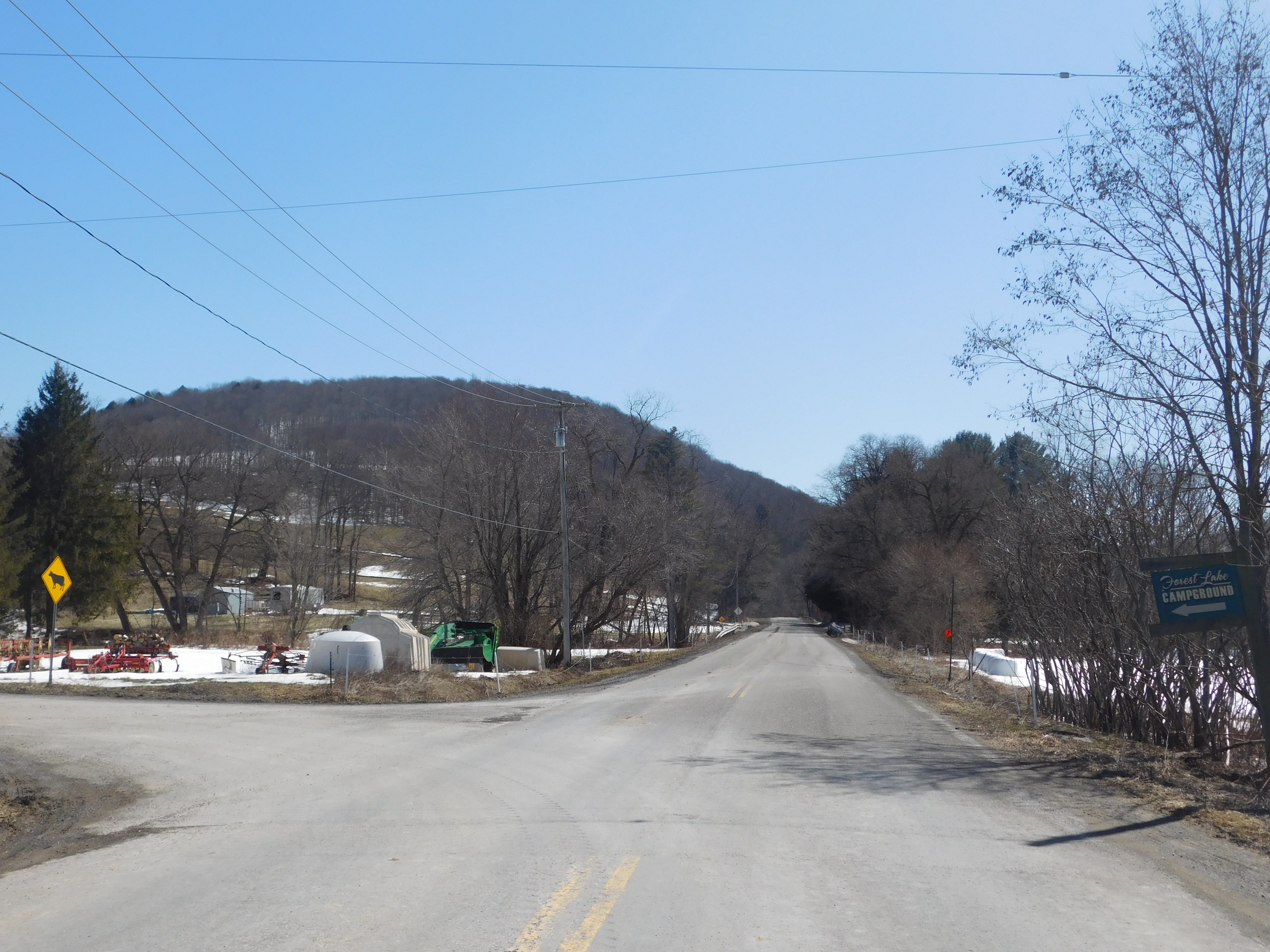
NY 91's former southern terminus in Cheningo

When NY 91 was assigned as part of the 1930 renumbering of state highways in New York, it was substantially longer than it is today. NY 91 originally began at NY 26 in Cincinnatus and followed Taylor Valley Road and Cheningo Road through the Truxton hamlet of Cheningo to the hamlet of Truxton, where it joined its modern alignment and proceeded north to Jamesville. From there, the route continued north past Jamesville to NY 31 in Bridgeport by way of overlaps with NY 173 and US 11 through downtown Syracuse and what is now NY 298 from Syracuse to Bridgeport. NY 91 was truncated southward to the intersection of US 11 and NY 173 west of Jamesville c. 1934 and eastward to its current northern terminus at Jamesville at some point between 1935 and 1938.

In the late 1930s, the route was truncated northward to begin in Cheningo. The former route to Cincinnatus on Taylor Valley Road was designated as CR 600 by 1974. NY 91 was truncated again on April 1, 1981, when ownership and maintenance of the portion of the route south of NY 13 in the hamlet of Truxton was transferred to Cortland County as part of a highway maintenance swap between the county and the state of New York. While NY 91 was cut back to the eastern terminus of its then-overlap with NY 13, the former routing of NY 91 south of Truxton to Cheningo on Cheningo Road was redesignated as CR 600A.

== Major intersections ==
County	Location	mi	km	Destinations	Notes
Cortland	Truxton	0.00	0.00	NY 13 (Main Street)	Southern terminus; hamlet of Truxton
Onondaga	Town of Fabius	8.27	13.31	NY 80 west	Hamlet of Apulia; western terminus of NY 80 / NY 91 overlap
Onondaga	Village of Fabius	11.58	18.64	NY 80 east	Eastern terminus of NY 80 / NY 91 overlap
Onondaga	Pompey	16.63	26.76	US 20 – LaFayette, Cazenovia	
Onondaga	DeWitt	23.77	38.25	NY 173 (East Seneca Turnpike) – Syracuse, Manlius	Northern terminus; hamlet of Jamesville
1.000 mi = 1.609 km; 1.000 km = 0.621 mi: Concurrency terminus

== See also ==
- List of county routes in Cortland County, New York
