= New York State Forests =

Public lands in New York State

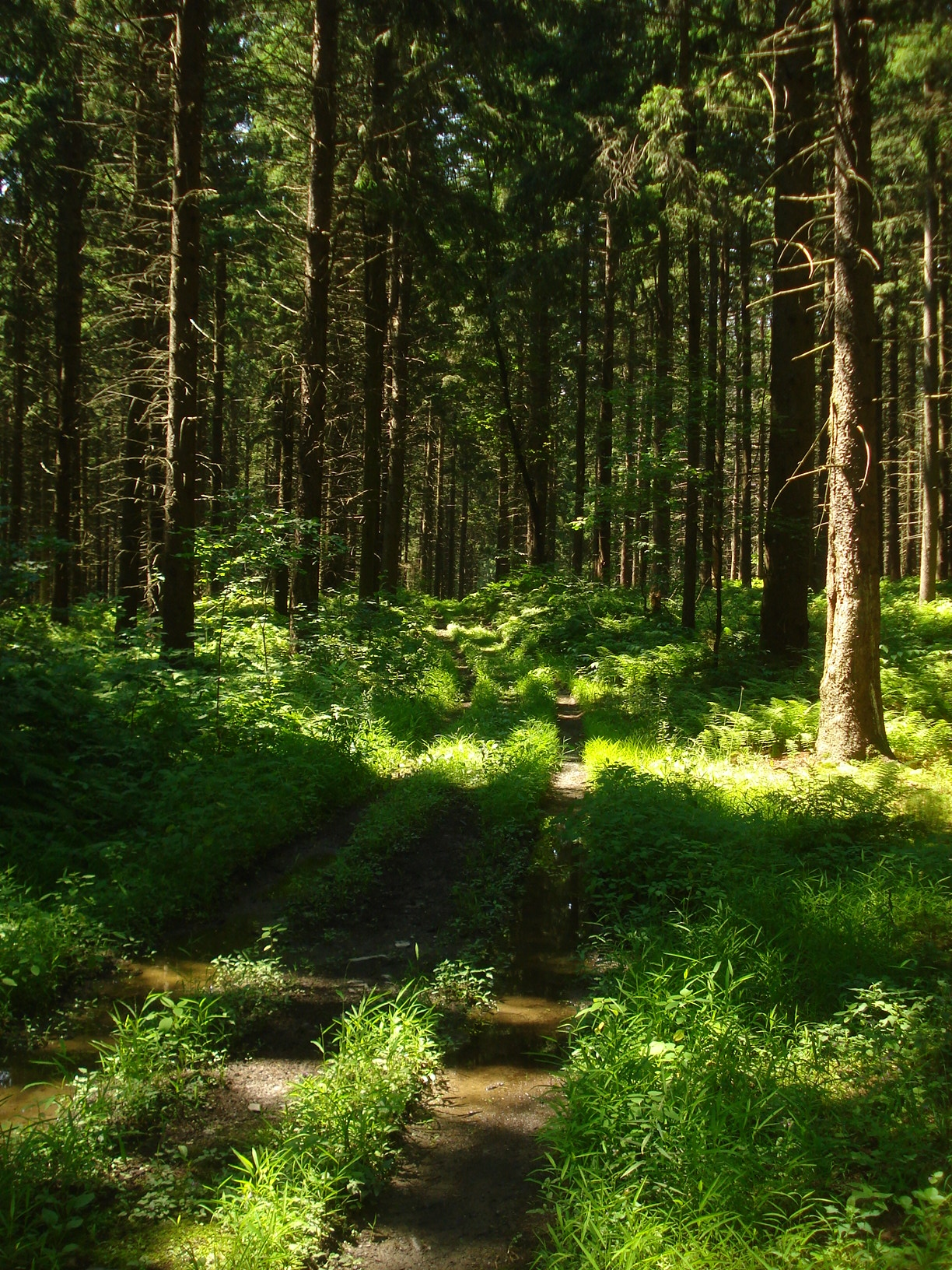
An old logging road through a pine plantation at Morgan Hill State Forest in Onondaga County, New York.

New York State Forests are public lands administered by the Division of Lands and Forests of the New York State Department of Environmental Conservation (NYSDEC). New York State Forests are designated as reforestation, multiple use, and unique areas; and state nature and historic preserves, with approximately 600,000 acres (2,400 km^{2}) classified as reforestation areas and approximately 9,000 acres (36 km^{2}) classified as multiple use lands. Land within the Adirondack Park or the Catskill Park is not included as part of the State Forest system.

== State forest management ==
The purpose of state forest management in New York is to promote forest conservation, improve ecosystem health and biodiversity, provide recreational opportunities, and derive economic benefits from forests by employing sustainable management practices. As of 2016, more than 787,000 acres (3,180 km^{2}; 1,230 mi^{2}) of forests are managed by the NYSDEC; this includes areas designated as state forests, reforestation areas, multiple-use areas, and unique areas, but does not include forest preserve lands within Adirondack Park and Catskill Park.

Permissible activities on New York state forest lands include hunting, trapping, fishing, hiking, snowshoeing, cross-county skiing, horseback riding, snowmobiling, and camping, although some properties prohibit some of these activities. Motorized vehicle use is prohibited except for on specified roads and trails. Camping for longer than three consecutive nights, or in groups of ten or greater people, requires a free permit issued by the NYSDEC; in addition, campsites must be located at least 150 feet (46 m) away from roads, trails, and streams unless previously established by the NYSDEC.

== Classifications ==
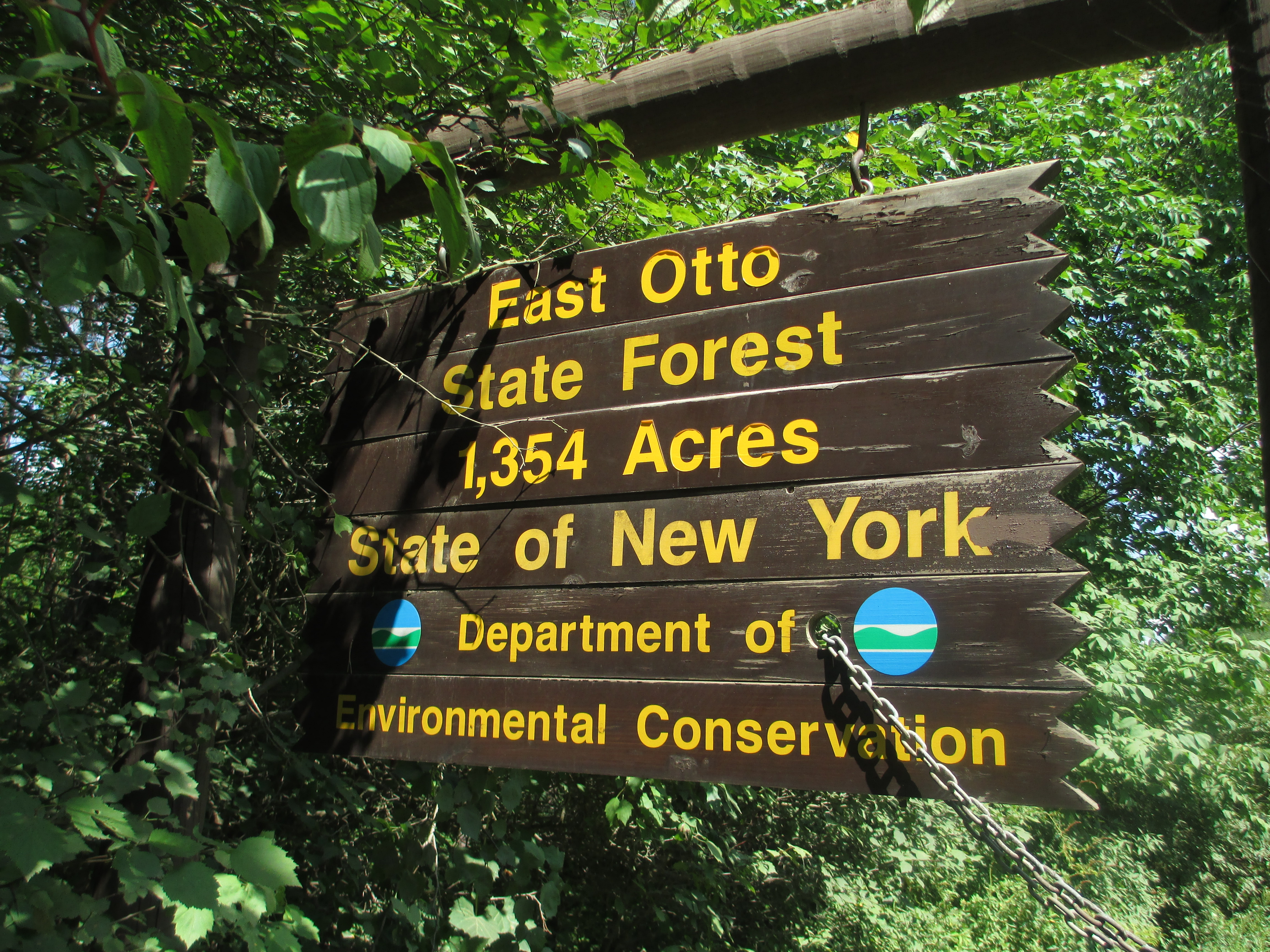
Entrance sign for the East Otto State Forest in Cattaraugus County.

There are four categories of state forest lands established under New York State law; their descriptions are below.

=== Reforestation areas ===
Lands obtained for reforestation and maintained for watershed protection, the production of timber and other forest products, and for recreation and related purposes. These areas must have at least 500 acres (200 ha) of contiguous lands that shall be forever devoted to the planting, growth and harvesting of such trees as shall be reforested.

=== Multiple use areas ===
Funded by the park and recreation land acquisition bond acts of 1960 and 1962 to provide opportunities for outdoor recreation, including public camping, fishing, hunting, boating, winter sports. Wherever possible, the multiple-use-areas should also serve multiple purposes involving the conservation and development of natural resources, including the preservation of scenic areas, watershed protection, forestry and reforestation.

=== Unique areas ===
Lands of special natural beauty, wilderness character, geological, ecological or historical significance; the unique areas may include lands within a forest preserve county outside the Adirondack and Catskill Parks.

=== State Nature and Historic Preserve ===
Lands dedicated to the State Nature and Historic Preserve (as referred to in Section 4 of Article XIV of the State Constitution) are declared to be put to their highest, best and most important use for one or more of the following purposes:

1. As natural communities for maintaining plants, animals and natural communities;
2. As reservoirs of natural materials and ecological processes that contribute to the state's biological diversity;
3. As field laboratories for scientific research and education in the natural sciences, including the fields of biology, conservation, ecology, natural history and paleontology; and
4. As places of natural and historical interest and beauty which provide the public with passive recreational opportunities including, where appropriate, fishing, hunting and trapping, or commercial fishing opportunities that are compatible with protecting the ecological significance, historic features and natural character of the area.

== List of New York state forests ==
The following sortable table includes several classifications of state forests in New York. Those labeled as "state forests" are managed for a variety of goals; many are reforestation areas that are intended for timber production and watershed protection, in addition to providing space for outdoor recreation. "Multiple use areas" are managed primarily to provide space for outdoor recreation, with the additional purpose of land conservation and protection. "Unique areas" are intended to protect areas with significant geological, ecological, aesthetic, or historical features.

Forest	County	Classification	Area	Notes
Albert J. Woodford	Oneida	State Forest		
Allen Lake	Allegany	State Forest	2,421 acres (9.80 km^{2})	
Altmar	Oswego	State Forest	959 acres (3.88 km^{2})	
Ambler	Chenango	State Forest	629 acres (2.55 km^{2})	
Andersen Hill	Tioga	State Forest	554 acres (2.24 km^{2})	
Arctic-China	Delaware	State Forest	2,959 acres (11.97 km^{2})	
Armlin Hill	Schoharie	State Forest		Managed as part of the 2,400-acre (9.7 km^{2}) Keyserkill State Forest Complex, which also includes Keyserkill State Forest and Gates Hill State Forest.
Arnold Lake	Otsego	State Forest	1,266 acres (5.12 km^{2})	
Ashland Pinnacle	Schoharie, Greene	State Forest	948 acres (3.84 km^{2})	
Baker School House	Cortland	State Forest	1,277 acres (5.17 km^{2})	
Bald Mountain	Allegany	State Forest	764 acres (3.09 km^{2})	
Balsam	Lewis	State Forest	559 acres (2.26 km^{2})	
Balsam Swamp	Chenango	State Forest	2,679 acres (10.84 km^{2})	
Barbour Brook	Delaware	State Forest	768 acres (3.11 km^{2})	
Bare Hill	Yates, Ontario	Unique Area	393 acres (1.59 km^{2})	
Basswood	Chenango	State Forest	938 acres (3.80 km^{2})	
Basswood Pond	Otsego	State Forest	720 acres (2.9 km^{2})	
Bates	Schoharie	State Forest	1,139 acres (4.61 km^{2})	
Battenkill	Washington	State Forest	535 acres (2.17 km^{2})	
Battle Hill	Oswego	State Forest	1,738 acres (7.03 km^{2})	
Beals Pond	Delaware	State Forest	1,116 acres (4.52 km^{2})	
Bear Creek	Cattaraugus	State Forest	547 acres (2.21 km^{2})	
Bear Swamp	Cayuga	State Forest	3,316 acres (13.42 km^{2})	
Bear Swamp	Otsego	State Forest	1,750 acres (7.1 km^{2})	
Bearpen Mountain	Greene, Delaware	State Forest	2,848 acres (11.53 km^{2})	
Beartown	Lewis	State Forest	7,211 acres (29.18 km^{2})	
Beaver Creek	Madison	State Forest	3,484 acres (14.10 km^{2})	
Beaver Creek	St. Lawrence	State Forest	3,694 acres (14.95 km^{2})	
Beaver Dam	Tioga	State Forest	1,148 acres (4.65 km^{2})	
Beaver Dams	Steuben, Schuyler	State Forest	534 acres (2.16 km^{2})	
Beaver Flow	Chenango, Broome	State Forest	1,028 acres (4.16 km^{2})	
Beaver Meadow	Chenango	State Forest	5,816 acres (23.54 km^{2})	
Beaver Pond	Broome	State Forest	791 acres (3.20 km^{2})	Formerly known as Page Pond State Forest.
Beebe Hill	Columbia	State Forest		
Beech Hill	Delaware	State Forest	1,116 acres (4.52 km^{2})	
Berlin	Rensselaer	State Forest		
Big Brook	Oneida	State Forest	3,895 acres (15.76 km^{2})	
Big Buck Mountain	Putnam	State Forest	146 acres (0.59 km^{2})	
Birdseye Hollow	Steuben	State Forest	3,446 acres (13.95 km^{2})	
Black Creek	Herkimer	State Forest	998 acres (4.04 km^{2})	
Black Creek	Ulster	State Forest	595 acres (2.41 km^{2})	
Blenheim Hill	Schoharie	State Forest	783 acres (3.17 km^{2})	
Bobell	Chenango	State Forest	2,156 acres (8.73 km^{2})	
Bog Brook	Putnam	Unique Area		
Bombay	Franklin	State Forest	2,747 acres (11.12 km^{2})	
Bonaparte's Cave	Lewis	State Forest	1,435 acres (5.81 km^{2})	
Bonner Lake	St. Lawrence	State Forest	98 acres (0.40 km^{2})	
Boutwell Hill	Chautauqua	State Forest	2,944 acres (11.91 km^{2})	
Boyce Hill	Cattaraugus	State Forest	971 acres (3.93 km^{2})	
Brandow Point	Greene	Unique Area		
Brasher	St. Lawrence	State Forest	19,751 acres (79.93 km^{2})	
Brokenstraw	Chautauqua	State Forest	951 acres (3.85 km^{2})	
Brookfield Railroad	Madison	State Forest	848 acres (3.43 km^{2})	
Bryant Hill	Cattaraugus	State Forest	509 acres (2.06 km^{2})	
Buck Hill	Oneida	State Forest	1,692 acres (6.85 km^{2})	
Buck's Brook	Chenango	State Forest	2,178 acres (8.81 km^{2})	
Buckton	St. Lawrence	State Forest	1,092 acres (4.42 km^{2})	
Bucktooth	Cattaraugus	State Forest	2,248 acres (9.10 km^{2})	
Bully Hill	Allegany	State Forest	3,513 acres (14.22 km^{2})	
Bumps Creek	Chenango	State Forest	528 acres (2.14 km^{2})	
Burnt Hill	Clinton	State Forest	1,575 acres (6.37 km^{2})	
Burnt-Rossman Hills	Schoharie	State Forest	9,788 acres (39.61 km^{2})	
Burt Hill	Steuben	Multiple Use Area	403 acres (1.63 km^{2})	
Bush Hill	Cattaraugus	State Forest	3,278 acres (13.27 km^{2})	
Cadyville	Clinton	State Forest	371 acres (1.50 km^{2})	
Cairo Lockwood	Greene	State Forest	48 acres (0.19 km^{2})	
Calhoun Creek	Otsego	State Forest	727 acres (2.94 km^{2})	
California Hill	Putnam	State Forest	982 acres (3.97 km^{2})	
California Road	St. Lawrence	State Forest	1,410 acres (5.7 km^{2})	
Cameron	Steuben	State Forest	1,990 acres (8.1 km^{2})	
Cameron Mills	Steuben	State Forest	54 acres (0.22 km^{2})	
Camillus Forest	Onondaga	Unique Area	355 acres (1.44 km^{2})	
Canacadea	Steuben	State Forest	1,623 acres (6.57 km^{2})	
Canada Creek	Oneida	State Forest	627 acres (2.54 km^{2})	
Canaseraga	Livingston	State Forest	1,287 acres (5.21 km^{2})	
Carpenter Falls	Cayuga	Unique Area	36 acres (0.15 km^{2})	
Cascade Valley	Broome	State Forest	533 acres (2.16 km^{2})	
Castle Rock	Putnam	Unique Area	129 acres (0.52 km^{2})	
Cat Hollow	Broome	State Forest	759 acres (3.07 km^{2})	
Catherineville	St. Lawrence	State Forest	1,623 acres (6.57 km^{2})	
Catlin	Chemung	State Forest	613 acres (2.48 km^{2})	
Cattaraugus	Cattaraugus	State Forest	1,059 acres (4.29 km^{2})	
Charles Baker	Madison	State Forest	9,400 acres (38 km^{2})	
Charleston	Montgomery	State Forest	3,954 acres (16.00 km^{2})	
Chateaugay	Oswego	State Forest	3,465 acres (14.02 km^{2})	
Chautauqua Gorge	Chautauqua	State Forest	538 acres (2.18 km^{2})	
Chazy Highlands	Clinton	State Forest	5,261 acres (21.29 km^{2})	
Cherry Valley	Otsego	State Forest	1,460 acres (5.9 km^{2})	
Chestnut Woods	Washington	State Forest	801 acres (3.24 km^{2})	
Cinnamon Lake	Schuyler, Steuben	State Forest	1,786 acres (7.23 km^{2})	
Clapper Hollow	Schoharie	State Forest	818 acres (3.31 km^{2})	
Clark Hill	Oneida	State Forest	2,872 acres (11.62 km^{2})	
Cliffside	Schuyler	State Forest	977 acres (3.95 km^{2})	
Clinton	Clinton	State Forest		
Cobb Brook	Oneida	State Forest	690 acres (2.8 km^{2})	
Cobb Creek	Lewis	State Forest	2,185 acres (8.84 km^{2})	
Cold Creek	Allegany	State Forest	501 acres (2.03 km^{2})	
Cold Spring Brook	St. Lawrence	State Forest	1,068 acres (4.32 km^{2})	
Cole Hill	Albany	State Forest	876 acres (3.55 km^{2})	
Columbia Lake	Delaware	State Forest	700 acres (2.8 km^{2})	
Coon Hollow	Schuyler	State Forest	2,456 acres (9.94 km^{2})	
Cottrell	Lewis	State Forest	473 acres (1.91 km^{2})	
Cotton Hill	Schoharie	State Forest		
Coventry	Chenango	State Forest	1,156 acres (4.68 km^{2})	
Cowee	Rensselaer	State Forest	3,700 acres (15 km^{2})	
Coyle Hill	Allegany	State Forest	2,343 acres (9.48 km^{2})	
Coyote Flats	Jefferson	State Forest	553 acres (2.24 km^{2})	
Crab Hollow	Allegany	State Forest	1,154 acres (4.67 km^{2})	
Crary Mills	St. Lawrence	State Forest	587 acres (2.38 km^{2})	
Croton Gorge	Westchester	Unique Area	21 acres (0.085 km^{2})	
Cuyler Hill	Cortland, Chenango	State Forest	5,507 acres (22.29 km^{2})	
Daketown	Saratoga	State Forest	506 acres (2.05 km^{2})	
Danby	Tompkins	State Forest	7,337 acres (29.69 km^{2})	
Daniel's Road	Saratoga	State Forest	523 acres (2.12 km^{2})	
Dannemora	Clinton	State Forest		
Decatur	Otsego	State Forest	582 acres (2.36 km^{2})	
Deer River	Franklin	State Forest		
Degrasse	St. Lawrence	State Forest	1,180 acres (4.8 km^{2})	
Depot Hill	Dutchess	Multiple Use Area	260 acres (1.1 km^{2})	
DeRuyter	Madison	State Forest	972 acres (3.93 km^{2})	
Dobbins	Cattaraugus	State Forest	1,100 acres (4.5 km^{2})	
Dog Hollow	Cortland	State Forest	723 acres (2.93 km^{2})	
Donahue Woods	Cortland	State Forest	1,165 acres (4.71 km^{2})	
Downerville	St. Lawrence	State Forest	1,443 acres (5.84 km^{2})	
Dry Run	Schuyler	State Forest	1,062 acres (4.30 km^{2})	
Dunkin's Reserve	Clinton	State Forest	2,433 acres (9.85 km^{2})	
Dutch Settlement	Schoharie	State Forest		
Dutton Ridge	Schoharie	State Forest	1,248 acres (5.05 km^{2})	
Earlville	Madison	State Forest	634 acres (2.57 km^{2})	
East Branch Fish Creek	Lewis	State Forest	1,350 acres (5.5 km^{2})	
East Osceola	Lewis	State Forest	1,975 acres (7.99 km^{2})	
East Otto	Cattaraugus	State Forest	1,354 acres (5.48 km^{2})	
Erwin Hollow	Steuben	State Forest	531 acres (2.15 km^{2})	
Erwin Mountain	Steuben	State Forest	507 acres (2.05 km^{2})	
Eldridge Swamp	Washington	State Forest	515 acres (2.08 km^{2})	
Elkdale	Cattaraugus	State Forest	422 acres (1.71 km^{2})	
English Hill	Allegany	State Forest	1,395 acres (5.65 km^{2})	
Exeter	Otsego	State Forest	1,957 acres (7.92 km^{2})	
Fairfield	Tioga	State Forest	815 acres (3.30 km^{2})	
Fall Brook	Oneida	State Forest	4,456 acres (18.03 km^{2})	
Farmersville	Cattaraugus	State Forest	1,144 acres (4.63 km^{2})	
Featherstonhaugh	Schenectady	State Forest	697 acres (2.82 km^{2})	
Fire Fall	St. Lawrence	State Forest	1,570 acres (6.4 km^{2})	
Fish Creek	Oneida	State Forest	678 acres (2.74 km^{2})	
Five Streams	Chenango	State Forest	6,353 acres (25.71 km^{2})	
Flat Rock	Clinton	State Forest	1,931 acres (7.81 km^{2})	
Florence Hill	Oneida	State Forest	1,361 acres (5.51 km^{2})	
Fort Jackson	St. Lawrence	State Forest	914 acres (3.70 km^{2})	
Frank E. Jadwin	Lewis	State Forest	20,412 acres (82.60 km^{2})	
Franklin 10	Franklin	State Forest		
Frozen Ocean	Cayuga	State Forest	754 acres (3.05 km^{2})	
Furnace Creek	Oneida	State Forest	1,395 acres (5.65 km^{2})	
Gas Springs	Allegany	State Forest	2,263 acres (9.16 km^{2})	
Gates Hill	Schoharie	State Forest		Managed as part of the 2,400-acre (9.7 km^{2}) Keyserkill State Forest Complex, which also includes Keyserkill State Forest and Armlin Hill State Forest.
Gee Brook	Cortland	State Forest	878 acres (3.55 km^{2})	
Genegantslet	Chenango	State Forest	3,181 acres (12.87 km^{2})	
General Jacob Morris	Otsego	State Forest	1,190 acres (4.8 km^{2})	
Gillies Hill	Allegany	State Forest	2,332 acres (9.44 km^{2})	
Glenmeal	St. Lawrence	State Forest	826 acres (3.34 km^{2})	
Gobbler's Knob	Orange	State Forest	303 acres (1.23 km^{2})	
Golden Hill	Cattaraugus	State Forest	2,283 acres (9.24 km^{2})	
Goose Egg	Washington	State Forest	456 acres (1.85 km^{2})	
Gorton Lake	Madison, Oneida	State Forest	500 acres (2.0 km^{2})	
Gould Corners	Jefferson	State Forest	2,045 acres (8.28 km^{2})	
Groundry Hill	Schuyler	State Forest	2,112 acres (8.55 km^{2})	
Granger	Lewis	State Forest	734 acres (2.97 km^{2})	
Grant Powell	Lewis	State Forest	8,077 acres (32.69 km^{2})	
Grantville	St. Lawrence	State Forest	775 acres (3.14 km^{2})	
Greenwood	Steuben	State Forest	906 acres (3.67 km^{2})	
Greenwood Creek	St. Lawrence	State Forest	1,009 acres (4.08 km^{2})	
Griggs Gulf	Cortland, Tioga	State Forest	2,365 acres (9.57 km^{2})	
Gulf	Clinton	Unique Area	605 acres (2.45 km^{2})	
Hall Island	Oswego	State Forest	2,079 acres (8.41 km^{2})	
Hammond Hill	Tompkins, Tioga	State Forest	3,618 acres (14.64 km^{2})	
Hand Hollow	Columbia	State Forest	518 acres (2.10 km^{2})	
Hannacroix	Greene	Unique Area		
Harris Hill	Chautauqua	State Forest	2,271 acres (9.19 km^{2})	
Hartwick	Otsego	State Forest	1,242 acres (5.03 km^{2})	
Harvey Mountain	Columbia	State Forest		
Hatch Creek	Chautauqua	State Forest	1,283 acres (5.19 km^{2})	
Hawkins Pond	Broome	State Forest	539 acres (2.18 km^{2})	
Hemlock Ridge	Ulster	Multiple Use Area	83 acres (0.34 km^{2})	
Hemlock-Canadice	Livingston, Ontario	State Forest	6,849 acres (27.72 km^{2})	
Henderson Shores	Jefferson	Unique Area	1,160 acres (4.7 km^{2})	
Hewitt	Cortland	State Forest	937 acres (3.79 km^{2})	
Hickok Brook	Sullivan	Multiple Use Area	1,036 acres (4.19 km^{2})	
Hickory Lake	St. Lawrence	State Forest		
High Flats	St. Lawrence	State Forest	2,018 acres (8.17 km^{2})	
High Knob	Schoharie	State Forest	1,344 acres (5.44 km^{2})	
High Towers	Lewis	State Forest	729 acres (2.95 km^{2})	
High Woods	Ulster	Multiple Use Area	43 acres (0.17 km^{2})	
Hill Higher	Chautauqua	State Forest	1,156 acres (4.68 km^{2})	
Hiltonville	Allegany	State Forest	999 acres (4.04 km^{2})	
Hinckley	Herkimer	State Forest	1,590 acres (6.4 km^{2})	
Hogsback	Lewis	State Forest	624 acres (2.53 km^{2})	
Hogsback	Oneida	State Forest	1,115 acres (4.51 km^{2})	
Honey Hill	Schoharie	State Forest	1,017 acres (4.12 km^{2})	
Hooker Mountain	Otsego	State Forest	801 acres (3.24 km^{2})	
Hoxie Gorge	Cortland	State Forest	2,115 acres (8.56 km^{2})	
Huckleberry Ridge	Orange	State Forest	1,450 acres (5.9 km^{2})	
Huntersfield	Schoharie, Greene	State Forest	1,300 acres (5.3 km^{2})	
Hunts Pond	Chenango	State Forest	1,397 acres (5.65 km^{2})	
Independence River	Lewis	State Forest	673 acres (2.72 km^{2})	
Indian Pipe	Lewis	State Forest	597 acres (2.42 km^{2})	
Italy Hill	Yates	State Forest	1,899 acres (7.68 km^{2})	
Jackson Hill	Oneida	State Forest	1,409 acres (5.70 km^{2})	
James Kennedy	Cortland	State Forest	4,422 acres (17.90 km^{2})	
Jenksville	Tioga	State Forest	1,349 acres (5.46 km^{2})	
Jersey Hill	Allegany	State Forest	1,088 acres (4.40 km^{2})	
Junius Ponds	Seneca	Unique Area		
Karr Valley Creek	Allegany	State Forest	1,917 acres (7.76 km^{2})	
Kasoag	Oswego	State Forest	909 acres (3.68 km^{2})	
Keeney Swamp	Allegany	State Forest	2,408 acres (9.74 km^{2})	
Kerryville	Delaware	State Forest	698 acres (2.82 km^{2})	
Ketchumville	Tioga	State Forest	503 acres (2.04 km^{2})	
Kettlebail	Cortland	State Forest	588 acres (2.38 km^{2})	
Keyserkill	Schoharie	State Forest		Managed as part of the 2,400-acre (9.7 km^{2}) Keyserkill State Forest Complex, which also includes Armlin Hill State Forest and Gates Hill State Forest.
Kings Park	Suffolk	Unique Area		
Klipnocky	Allegany	State Forest	2,634 acres (10.66 km^{2})	
Klondike	Oswego	State Forest	867 acres (3.51 km^{2})	
Knapp Station	St. Lawrence	State Forest	1,006 acres (4.07 km^{2})	
Kowawese	Orange	Unique Area		
Labrador Hollow	Cortland, Onondaga	Unique Area	1,474 acres (5.97 km^{2})	
Lafayetteville	Dutchess	Multiple Use Area	715 acres (2.89 km^{2})	
Lake Desolation	Saratoga	State Forest	443 acres (1.79 km^{2})	
Lassellsville	Fulton	State Forest		
Lebanon	Madison	State Forest	779 acres (3.15 km^{2})	
Leonard Hill	Schoharie	State Forest	1,616 acres (6.54 km^{2})	
Lesser Wilderness	Lewis	State Forest	13,793 acres (55.82 km^{2})	
Lincklaen	Chenango	State Forest	4,655 acres (18.84 km^{2})	
Lincoln Mountain	Saratoga	State Forest	993 acres (4.02 km^{2})	
Line Brook	Lewis	State Forest	1,116 acres (4.52 km^{2})	
Lonesome Bay	St. Lawrence	State Forest	1,122 acres (4.54 km^{2})	
Long Pond	Chenango	State Forest	3,254 acres (13.17 km^{2})	
Lookout	Lewis	State Forest	3,915 acres (15.84 km^{2})	
Lost Nation	Allegany	State Forest	1,344 acres (5.44 km^{2})	
Lost Nation	St. Lawrence	State Forest	1,907 acres (7.72 km^{2})	
Lost Valley	Montgomery	State Forest	750 acres (3.0 km^{2})	
Ludlow Creek	Chenango	State Forest	3,197 acres (12.94 km^{2})	
Lutheranville	Otsego, Schoharie	State Forest	1,817 acres (7.35 km^{2})	
Lyon Brook	Chenango	State Forest	528 acres (2.14 km^{2})	
Macomb Reservation	Clinton	State Forest	1,068 acres (4.32 km^{2})	
Mad River	Oneida	State Forest	2,929 acres (11.85 km^{2})	
Mallet Pond	Schoharie	State Forest	2,525 acres (10.22 km^{2})	
Maple Hill	Chemung	State Forest	604 acres (2.44 km^{2})	
Maple Valley	Otsego	State Forest	804 acres (3.25 km^{2})	
Marisposa	Madison	State Forest	3,002 acres (12.15 km^{2})	
Marsh Pond	Broome	State Forest	893 acres (3.61 km^{2})	
Maxon Creek	Cortland	State Forest	908 acres (3.67 km^{2})	Also known as Pease Hill State Forest.
McCarty Hill	Cattaraugus	State Forest		
McCarthy Hill	Steuben	State Forest	794 acres (3.21 km^{2})	
McDonough	Chenango	State Forest	6,772 acres (27.41 km^{2})	Also known as Bowman Creek State Forest.
Meads Creek	Steuben	State Forest	1,452 acres (5.88 km^{2})	
Melondy Hill	Chenango, Broome	State Forest	5,417 acres (21.92 km^{2})	
Michigan Hill	Delaware	State Forest	619 acres (2.51 km^{2})	
Michigan Hill	Tioga	State Forest	1,180 acres (4.8 km^{2})	
Middle Ground Flats	Greene	Unique Area		
Middle Grove	Saratoga	State Forest	576 acres (2.33 km^{2})	
Milford	Otsego	State Forest	512 acres (2.07 km^{2})	
Mohawk Springs	Lewis	State Forest	1,210 acres (4.9 km^{2})	
Montrose Point	Westchester	State Forest	51 acres (0.21 km^{2})	Managed cooperatively with the Westchester County Parks Department.
Moon Pond	Clinton	State Forest	786 acres (3.18 km^{2})	
Morgan Hill	Onondaga, Cortland	State Forest	5,284 acres (21.38 km^{2})	
Morrow Mountain	Madison	State Forest	1,290 acres (5.2 km^{2})	
Moss Hill	Steuben	State Forest	1,815 acres (7.35 km^{2})	
Mount Hayden	Greene	State Forest	844 acres (3.42 km^{2})	
Mount Hunger	Oneida	State Forest		
Mount Loretto	Richmond	Unique Area	241 acres (0.98 km^{2})	
Mount Pisgah	Greene, Schoharie	State Forest	650 acres (2.6 km^{2})	
Mount Pleasant	Chautauqua	State Forest	1,522 acres (6.16 km^{2})	
Mount Tom	Washington	State Forest	1,724 acres (6.98 km^{2})	
Mount Washington	Steuben	Multiple Use Area	440 acres (1.8 km^{2})	
Muller Hill	Madison	State Forest	3,090 acres (12.5 km^{2})	
Murphy Hill	Delaware	State Forest		
Nanticoke Lake	Broome	Multiple Use Area	338 acres (1.37 km^{2})	
Nelson Swamp	Madison	Unique Area	574 acres (2.32 km^{2})	
Neversink River	Sullivan	Unique Area	6,580 acres (26.6 km^{2})	
Newfield	Tompkins	State Forest	1,552 acres (6.28 km^{2})	
Nimham Mountain	Putnam	Multiple Use Area	1,023 acres (4.14 km^{2})	
Nine Mile Creek	Cattaraugus	State Forest	3,162 acres (12.80 km^{2})	
North Harmony	Chautauqua	State Forest	2,561 acres (10.36 km^{2})	
Nutten Hook	Columbia	Unique Area		
O'Hara	Oswego, Oneida	State Forest	1,064 acres (4.31 km^{2})	
Oak Ridge	Ulster	Multiple Use Area	96 acres (0.39 km^{2})	
Oak Ridge	Chenango	State Forest	576 acres (2.33 km^{2})	
Oakley Corners	Tioga	State Forest	1,025 acres (4.15 km^{2})	
Ohisa	Herkimer	State Forest		
Old Westbury	Nassau	Unique Area		
Onjebonge	Lewis	State Forest	1,835 acres (7.43 km^{2})	
Onondaga Escarpment	Erie	Unique Area	52 acres (0.21 km^{2})	
Orebed Creek	St. Lawrence	State Forest	791 acres (3.20 km^{2})	
Orton Hollow	Oswego	State Forest	507 acres (2.05 km^{2})	
Ossian	Livingston	State Forest	1,303 acres (5.27 km^{2})	
Otselic	Chenango	State Forest	1,043 acres (4.22 km^{2})	
Otsquago	Herkimer	State Forest		
Otter Creek	Lewis	State Forest	1,206 acres (4.88 km^{2})	
Painter Hill	Sullivan	Multiple Use Area	104 acres (0.42 km^{2})	
Palmer's Pond	Allegany	State Forest	3,645 acres (14.75 km^{2})	
Panama	Chautauqua	State Forest	1,224 acres (4.95 km^{2})	
Papish Pond	Cortland	Multiple Use Area	193 acres (0.78 km^{2})	
Partridge Run	Albany	State Forest	880 acres (3.6 km^{2})	
Patria	Schoharie	State Forest		
Patriot's Hollow	Suffolk	State Forest		
Peck Hill	Fulton	State Forest		
Penn Mountain	Oneida	State Forest	3,725 acres (15.07 km^{2})	
Perkins Pond	Chenango	State Forest	1,895 acres (7.67 km^{2})	
Petersburg	Schoharie	State Forest		
Pharsalia Woods	Chenango	State Forest	9,164 acres (37.09 km^{2})	Formerly known as New Michigan State Forest.
Phillips Creek	Allegany	State Forest	2,709 acres (10.96 km^{2})	
Pigeon Hill	Chenango	State Forest	736 acres (2.98 km^{2})	
Pigtail Hollow	Steuben	State Forest	998 acres (4.04 km^{2})	
Pinckney	Lewis, Jefferson	State Forest	2,091 acres (8.46 km^{2})	
Pine Hill	Cattaraugus	State Forest	1,139 acres (4.61 km^{2})	
Pine Hill	Delaware	State Forest	1,089 acres (4.41 km^{2})	
Pine Ridge	Chenango	State Forest	274 acres (1.11 km^{2})	
Pitcher Springs	Chenango	State Forest	1,836 acres (7.43 km^{2})	
Pittstown	Rensselaer	State Forest		
Plainfield	Otsego	State Forest	1,403 acres (5.68 km^{2})	
Plattekill	Delaware	State Forest		
Pleasant Lake	St. Lawrence	State Forest	963 acres (3.90 km^{2})	
Plumbottom	Allegany	State Forest	1,666 acres (6.74 km^{2})	
Pochuck	Orange	State Forest	503 acres (2.04 km^{2})	
Point Rock	Oneida	State Forest	1,202 acres (4.86 km^{2})	
Popple Pond	Oneida	State Forest	2,446 acres (9.90 km^{2})	
Potato Hill	Tompkins	State Forest	915 acres (3.70 km^{2})	
Pulpit Rock	Jefferson	State Forest	1,603 acres (6.49 km^{2})	
Punkeyville	Oneida	State Forest	535 acres (2.17 km^{2})	
R. Milton Hick	Otsego	State Forest	1,293 acres (5.23 km^{2})	
Raecher	Cattaraugus	State Forest	832 acres (3.37 km^{2})	
Ralph Road	Warren	State Forest	515 acres (2.08 km^{2})	
Raymondville	St. Lawrence	State Forest	641 acres (2.59 km^{2})	
Raywood	Lewis	Unique Area	307 acres (1.24 km^{2})	
Red Brook	Chenango	State Forest	601 acres (2.43 km^{2})	
Reinstein Woods Nature Preserve	Erie	Unique Area	292 acres (1.18 km^{2})	
Relay	Delaware	State Forest		
Rensselaerville	Albany, Schoharie	State Forest	2,849 acres (11.53 km^{2})	
Robinson Hollow	Tioga, Tompkins, Cortland	State Forest	1,938 acres (7.84 km^{2})	
Rock City	Cattaraugus	State Forest		
Rock Creek	Steuben	State Forest	704 acres (2.85 km^{2})	
Rockwood	Fulton	State Forest		
Roeliff Jansen Kill	Dutchess	Multiple Use Area	128 acres (0.52 km^{2})	
Rome Sand Plains	Oneida	Unique Area	1,700 acres (6.9 km^{2})	
Roosa Gap	Sullivan	State Forest	680 acres (2.8 km^{2})	
Roseboom	Otsego	State Forest	620 acres (2.5 km^{2})	
Rural Grove	Montgomery	State Forest	1,289 acres (5.22 km^{2})	
Rush Creek	Allegany	State Forest	1,404 acres (5.68 km^{2})	
Rush Oak Openings	Monroe	Unique Area	230 acres (0.93 km^{2})	
Saint Regis	Franklin	State Forest		
Salmon River	Oswego	State Forest	2,033 acres (8.23 km^{2})	
Salmon River Falls	Oswego	Unique Area	112 acres (0.45 km^{2})	
Sand Bay	Lewis	State Forest	326 acres (1.32 km^{2})	
Sand Flats	Lewis	State Forest	2,532 acres (10.25 km^{2})	
Sandy Creek	Oswego	State Forest	538 acres (2.18 km^{2})	
Scott Patent	Schoharie, Albany	State Forest	1,220 acres (4.9 km^{2})	
Sears Pond	Lewis	State Forest	5,648 acres (22.86 km^{2})	
Shawangunk	Ulster	Multiple Use Area	58 acres (0.23 km^{2})	
Shawangunk Ridge	Ulster, Sullivan	State Forest	1,411 acres (5.71 km^{2})	
Shindagin Hollow	Tompkins, Tioga	State Forest	5,266 acres (21.31 km^{2})	
Silver Hill	St. Lawrence	State Forest	783 acres (3.17 km^{2})	
Skinner Hill	Chenango	State Forest	1,666 acres (6.74 km^{2})	
Skyline Drive	Broome	State Forest	533 acres (2.16 km^{2})	
Slader Creek	Allegany	State Forest	1,229 acres (4.97 km^{2})	
Snow Bowl	St. Lawrence	State Forest	797 acres (3.23 km^{2})	
Sodom	St. Lawrence	State Forest	1,426 acres (5.77 km^{2})	
Sonyea	Livingston	State Forest	922 acres (3.73 km^{2})	
South Bradford	Steuben	State Forest	1,819 acres (7.36 km^{2})	
South Hammond	St. Lawrence	State Forest	2,086 acres (8.44 km^{2})	
South Hill	Chenango	State Forest	1,314 acres (5.32 km^{2})	
South Hill	Delaware, Otsego	State Forest	521 acres (2.11 km^{2})	
South Hill	Oneida	State Forest	522 acres (2.11 km^{2})	
South Mountain	Schoharie, Greene	State Forest	1,498 acres (6.06 km^{2})	
South Valley	Cattaraugus	State Forest	4,227 acres (17.11 km^{2})	
Southville	St. Lawrence	State Forest	551 acres (2.23 km^{2})	
Split Rock	Onondaga	Unique Area	29 acres (0.12 km^{2})	
Spring Brook	Clinton	State Forest	1,157 acres (4.68 km^{2})	
Squaw Island	Ontario	Unique Area	0.2 acres (0.00081 km^{2})	Managed by the DEC Bureau of Wildlife.
Stammer Creek	St. Lawrence	State Forest	460 acres (1.9 km^{2})	
Steam Mill	Delaware	State Forest	5,618 acres (22.74 km^{2})	
Steuben Hill	Herkimer	State Forest	1,008 acres (4.08 km^{2})	
Stewart	Orange	State Forest	6,700 acres (27 km^{2})	
Stid Hill	Ontario	Multiple Use Area	847 acres (3.43 km^{2})	
Stissing Mountain	Dutchess	Multiple Use Area	590 acres (2.4 km^{2})	
Stockton	Chautauqua	State Forest	977 acres (3.95 km^{2})	
Stone Barn	Oneida	State Forest	621 acres (2.51 km^{2})	
Stone Hill	Oswego	State Forest	866 acres (3.50 km^{2})	
Stone Store	Schoharie	State Forest	732 acres (2.96 km^{2})	
Stoney Pond	Madison	State Forest	1,469 acres (5.94 km^{2})	
Sugar Hill	Schuyler	State Forest	9,085 acres (36.77 km^{2})	
Summer Hill	Cayuga	State Forest	4,355 acres (17.62 km^{2})	
Susquehanna	Otsego	State Forest	423 acres (1.71 km^{2})	
Swancott Hill	Oneida, Lewis	State Forest	2,012 acres (8.14 km^{2})	
Swancott Mill	Lewis	State Forest	744 acres (3.01 km^{2})	
Swift Hill	Allegany	State Forest	1,569 acres (6.35 km^{2})	
Taconic Hereford	Dutchess	Multiple Use Area	917 acres (3.71 km^{2})	
Taconic Ridge	Rensselaer	State Forest	3,834 acres (15.52 km^{2})	
Tassell Hill	Oneida	State Forest		
Taylor Creek	St. Lawrence	State Forest	1,860 acres (7.5 km^{2})	
Taylor Valley	Cortland	State Forest	4,639 acres (18.77 km^{2})	
Terry Mountain	Clinton	State Forest	4,739 acres (19.18 km^{2})	
Texas Hill	Madison	State Forest	704 acres (2.85 km^{2})	
Texas Hollow	Schuyler	State Forest	937 acres (3.79 km^{2})	
Texas School House	Otsego	State Forest	1,245 acres (5.04 km^{2})	
The Saddles	Washington	State Forest	2,471 acres (10.00 km^{2})	
Three Springs	Madison	State Forest	797 acres (3.23 km^{2})	
Tibbetts	Rensselaer	State Forest	846 acres (3.42 km^{2})	
Titusville Mountain	Franklin	State Forest		
Tomannex	Delaware	State Forest		
Toothaker Creek	St. Lawrence	State Forest	709 acres (2.87 km^{2})	
Tracy Creek	Broome, Tioga	State Forest	512 acres (2.07 km^{2})	
Tracy Creek	Steuben	State Forest	569 acres (2.30 km^{2})	
Tri-County	Oneida	State Forest	1,290 acres (5.2 km^{2})	
Triangle	Broome	State Forest	661 acres (2.67 km^{2})	
Trout Brook	Oswego	State Forest	622 acres (2.52 km^{2})	
Trout Lake	St. Lawrence	State Forest	1,087 acres (4.40 km^{2})	
Trout River	Franklin	State Forest		
Tug Hill	Jefferson, Lewis	State Forest	12,242 acres (49.54 km^{2})	
Tuller Hill	Cortland	State Forest	2,440 acres (9.9 km^{2})	
Turkey Hill	Tioga	State Forest	1,108 acres (4.48 km^{2})	
Turkey Point	Ulster	State Forest	139 acres (0.56 km^{2})	
Turkey Ridge	Steuben	State Forest	676 acres (2.74 km^{2})	
Turnpike	Allegany	State Forest	4,744 acres (19.20 km^{2})	
Urbana	Steuben	State Forest	2,690 acres (10.9 km^{2})	
Ushers Road	Saratoga	State Forest	88 acres (0.36 km^{2})	
Vandermark	Allegany	State Forest	2,384 acres (9.65 km^{2})	
Vernooykill	Ulster	State Forest		
Wagner Farm	Otsego	State Forest	463 acres (1.87 km^{2})	
Wassaic	Dutchess	Multiple Use Area	488 acres (1.97 km^{2})	
Webster Hill	Oneida	State Forest	1,064 acres (4.31 km^{2})	
Wellman	Chautauqua	State Forest	447 acres (1.81 km^{2})	
West Branch	Oneida	State Forest	527 acres (2.13 km^{2})	
West Hill	Steuben	State Forest	887 acres (3.59 km^{2})	
West Mountain	Dutchess	State Forest	830 acres (3.4 km^{2})	
West Oscela	Oswego, Lewis	State Forest	1,900 acres (7.7 km^{2})	
West Parishville	St. Lawrence	State Forest	792 acres (3.21 km^{2})	
Whalen	Chautauqua	State Forest	1,325 acres (5.36 km^{2})	
Whaupaunaucau	Chenango	State Forest	1,188 acres (4.81 km^{2})	
Whippoorwill Corners	St. Lawrence	State Forest	1,281 acres (5.18 km^{2})	
Whiskey Flats	St. Lawrence	State Forest	2,533 acres (10.25 km^{2})	
White Pond	Putnam	Multiple Use Area	276 acres (1.12 km^{2})	
Whittacker Swamp	Broome	State Forest	812 acres (3.29 km^{2})	
Wiley Brook	Chenango	State Forest	1,240 acres (5.0 km^{2})	
Windfall Creek	Cattaraugus	State Forest	968 acres (3.92 km^{2})	
Winona	Jefferson, Oswego	State Forest	9,233 acres (37.36 km^{2})	
Witch's Hole	Ulster	Multiple Use Area	451 acres (1.83 km^{2})	
Wolf Brook	Sullivan	Multiple Use Area	585 acres (2.37 km^{2})	
Wolf Lake	St. Lawrence	State Forest	4,316 acres (17.47 km^{2})	
Woodhull	Oneida	State Forest	567 acres (2.29 km^{2})	
Wurtsboro Ridge	Sullivan	State Forest	1,139 acres (4.61 km^{2})	
Yatesville Falls	Montgomery	State Forest	714 acres (2.89 km^{2})	
Yellow Barn	Tompkins	State Forest	1,289 acres (5.22 km^{2})	
Yellow Lake	St. Lawrence	State Forest	751 acres (3.04 km^{2})	
Zoar Valley	Cattaraugus, Erie	Multiple Use Area	3,014 acres (12.20 km^{2})	Acreage includes lands designated as the Zoar Valley Unique Area, which is contained within the Zoar Valley Multiple Use Area.
Zoar Valley	Cattaraugus, Erie	Unique Area	1,492 acres (6.04 km^{2})	Covers the gorge and a buffer area within the Zoar Valley Multiple Use Area.

== See also ==
- Long Island Central Pine Barrens
- New York State Wildlife Management Areas
