= Truxton, New York =

- Town
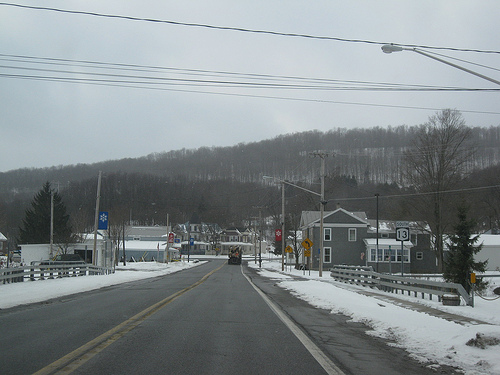
- Main St. (Rt. 13)

- Location within Cortland County and New York

- Location in the United States Truxton (New York)
- Coordinates: 42°42′33″N 76°1′25″W
- Country: United States
- State: New York
- County: Cortland

Government
  - Type: Town Council
  - Town Supervisor: Lloyd Sutton
  - Town Council: Members' List: • Lloyd G. Sutton, Jr. (R); • Stephanie Potter (R); • Ghasson Wehbe (R); • Adam A. Aldrich (R)

Area
  - Total: 44.73 sq mi (115.84 km^{2})
  - Land: 44.65 sq mi (115.64 km^{2})
  - Water: 0.077 sq mi (0.20 km^{2})
- Elevation: 1,142 ft (348 m)

Population (2010)
  - Total: 1,133
  - Estimate (2016): 1,093
  - Density: 24.5/sq mi (9.45/km^{2})
- Time zone: UTC-5 (Eastern (EST))
  - Summer (DST): UTC-4 (EDT)
- ZIP Codes: 13158 (Truxton); 13045 (Cortland); 13101 (McGraw); 13159 (Tully); 13040 (Cincinnatus)
- Area code: 607
- FIPS code: 36-023-75550
- GNIS feature ID: 0979560
- Website: www.townoftruxton.com

Truxton is a town in Cortland County, New York, United States. The population was 1,133 at the 2010 census. The town is named for Commodore Thomas Truxtun, a privateer in the American Revolution and one of the US Navy's first commanding officers.

Truxton is in the northeastern part of the county, northeast of the city of Cortland.

== History ==
The region that includes Cortland County was part of the Central New York Military Tract.

The first settler arrived around 1793. The town of Truxton was formed from part of the town of Fabius (in Onondaga County) when Cortland County was created in 1808. An addition was made in 1811 to Truxton from the town of Solon. In 1858, the eastern part of Truxton was used to form the town of Cuyler.

In 1865, the population was 1,689.

The Truxton Depot was listed on the National Register of Historic Places in 2008.

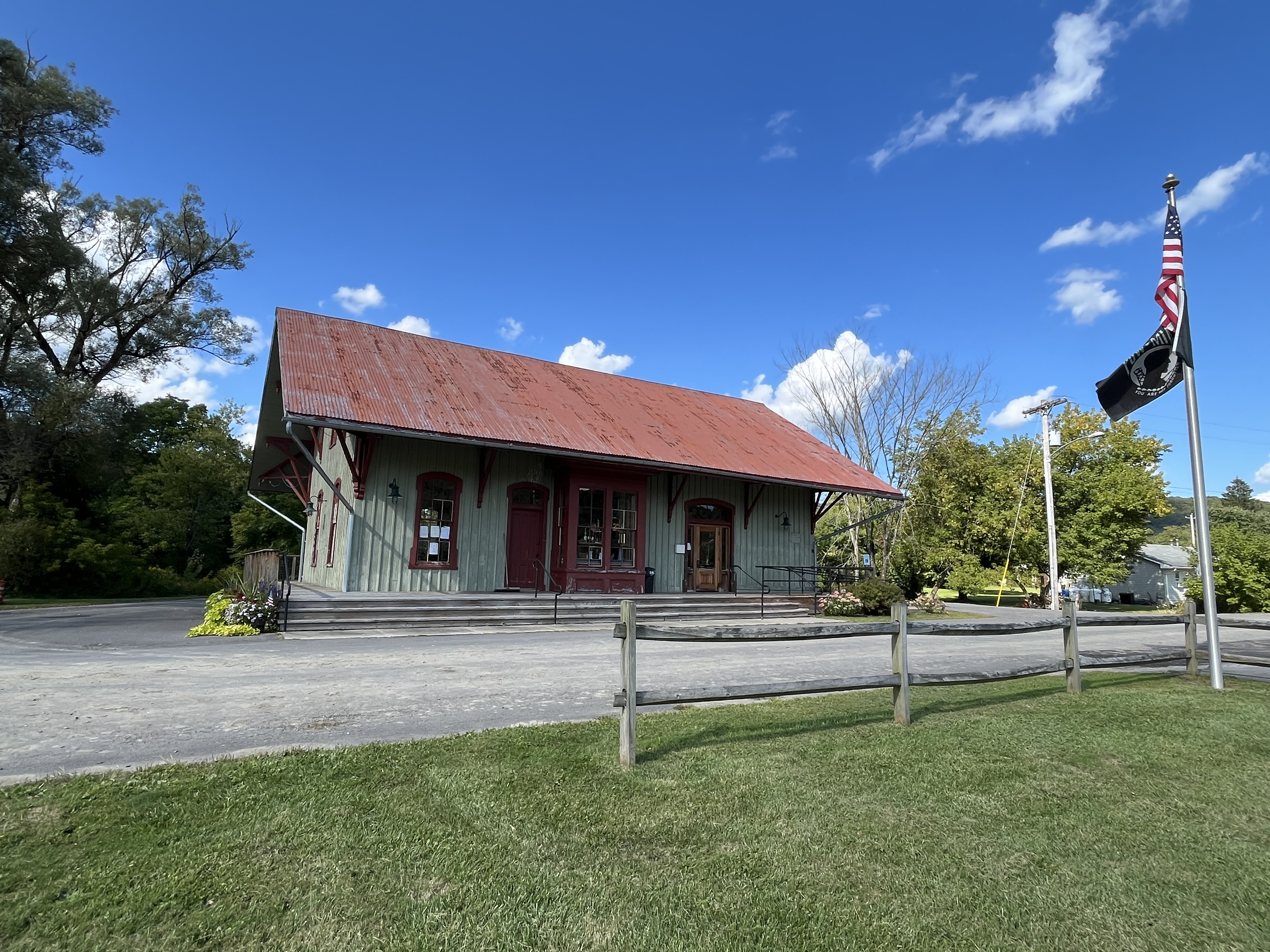
Truxton Depot, now the town hall of Truxton

== Notable people ==
- John McGraw (1873–1934), Hall of Fame manager for the New York Giants in the early 20th century; was a Truxton native. His monument stands in the hamlet of Truxton.
- Mary Blanchard Lynde (1819–1897), philanthropist and social reformer

== Geography ==
According to the United States Census Bureau, the town has a total area of 44.7 square miles (115.8 km^{2}), of which 44.6 square miles (115.6 km^{2}) is land and 0.077 square miles (0.2 km^{2}), or 0.17%, is water.

The northern town line is the border of Onondaga County.

The East Branch of the Tioughnioga River passes through the town.

New York State Route 13 intersects New York State Route 91 at Truxton village.

== Demographics ==
Historical population
Census	Pop.	Note	%±
1820	2,956		—
1830	3,888		31.5%
1840	3,587		−7.7%
1850	3,444		−4.0%
1860	1,914		−44.4%
1870	1,618		−15.5%
1880	1,550		−4.2%
1890	1,328		−14.3%
1900	1,217		−8.4%
1910	1,132		−7.0%
1920	920		−18.7%
1930	997		8.4%
1940	1,008		1.1%
1950	922		−8.5%
1960	907		−1.6%
1970	955		5.3%
1980	988		3.5%
1990	1,064		7.7%
2000	1,225		15.1%
2010	1,133		−7.5%
2016 (est.)	1,093		−3.5%
U.S. Decennial Census

As of the census of 2000, there were 1,225 people, 440 households, and 337 families residing in the town. The population density was 27.4 inhabitants per square mile (10.6/km^{2}). There were 536 housing units at an average density of 12.0 per square mile (4.6/km^{2}). The racial makeup of the town was 97.55% White, 0.57% Black or African American, 0.16% Native American, 0.16% Asian, and 1.55% from two or more races. Hispanic or Latino of any race were 0.65% of the population.

There were 440 households, out of which 37.5% had children under the age of 18 living with them, 61.4% were married couples living together, 11.1% had a female householder with no husband present, and 23.2% were non-families. 16.4% of all households were made up of individuals, and 7.0% had someone living alone who was 65 years of age or older. The average household size was 2.77 and the average family size was 3.08.

In the town, the population was spread out, with 29.6% under the age of 18, 6.3% from 18 to 24, 31.3% from 25 to 44, 22.0% from 45 to 64, and 10.9% who were 65 years of age or older. The median age was 36 years. For every 100 females, there were 99.5 males. For every 100 females age 18 and over, there were 97.0 males.

The median income for a household in the town was $39,115, and the median income for a family was $41,000. Males had a median income of $29,306 versus $21,384 for females. The per capita income for the town was $16,516. About 8.9% of families and 11.6% of the population were below the poverty line, including 13.3% of those under age 18 and 12.0% of those age 65 or over.

== Communities and locations in Truxton ==
- Cheningo – A hamlet in the southern part of the town by Cheningo Creek.
- Cheningo Creek A tributary of the East Branch Tioughnioga River in the southern part of Truxton.
- Crains Mills – A hamlet east of Truxton village on Route 13.
- Forest Lake Campground - A privately owned campground is home to 100+ families during the summer camping season.
- Labrador Creek – A stream flowing southward to enter the East Branch of the Tioughnioga River near Truxton village.
- Labrador Hollow Unique Area – A state-owned conservation area in the southwestern part of the town.
- Labrador Mountain – A skiing area near the western town line.
- Manchester Mills – A former community in the town near the East Branch Tioughnioga River.
- Truxton – The hamlet of Truxton is on NY-13 and NY-91.
- Tubville – A former community in the town.
