= Susquehanna State Park =

Susquehanna State Park can refer to:

- Susquehanna State Park (Maryland) near Havre de Grace, Maryland.
- Susquehanna State Park (Pennsylvania) in Williamsport, Pennsylvania.

or a related term, Susquehannock:

- Susquehannock State Park in Lancaster County, Pennsylvania
- Susquehannock State Forest near Coudersport, Pennsylvania.

other possibilities:

- Susquehanna State Forest in Otsego County, New York
