= Morgan Hill (New York) =

Mountain in New York, United States

- Location within New York Location within the United States

Highest point
- Elevation: 2,028 feet (618 m)
- Listing: New York county high points 35th (Onondaga County)
- Coordinates: 42°45′28″N 76°00′24″W, 42°44′24″N 76°00′32″W, 42°47′07″N 75°59′36″W

Geography
- Location: NNE of Truxton, New York, U.S.
- Topo map(s): USGS Tully, Truxton, DeRuyter

Morgan Hill is a mountain in the central part of the state of New York. It is located north-northeast of Truxton in Cortland County with a small portion in Onondaga County. The portion of the mountain within Onondaga County is the highest point in the county.

Much or all of the hill, including its summit, is within Morgan Hill State Forest.

== History ==
In 1940, the Civilian Conservation Corps Camp S-103 of DeRuyter built an 82.5-foot-tall (25.1 m) International Derrick steel fire lookout tower on the mountain. Due to increased use of aerial fire detection, the tower ceased fire lookout operation at the end of 1970. The tower was later removed in 1978.
