= Little Rock City =

Little Rock City may refer to:

- Little Rock, Arkansas
- Little Rock City, an area of geological features within Rock City State Forest in western New York
- Stone Fort bouldering area in Soddy-Daisy, Tennessee
