= California Hill State Forest =

State forest in New York, United States

- Location within New York
- Location: Putnam County, NY, USA
- Coordinates: 41°26′18″N 73°46′23″W
- Area: 982 acres (397 ha)
- Established: 2007
- Governing body: New York State Department of Environmental Conservation

California Hill State Forest is a 982-acre (397 ha) New York State Forest in the towns of Kent and Putnam Valley in Putnam County, New York. The forest was created in 2007 when the state bought land that made contiguous three existing multiple use areas at Pudding Street, Gordon Road, and California Hill.

The New York State Department of Environmental Conservation is creating a system of mixed use trails for mountain biking (there is an existing, unauthorized, biking trail in the park), hiking, and hunting. The forest includes Lake Waywayanda and the Pudding Street Pond that contain a large variety of fish. Wildlife in the forest includes wild turkey, white-tailed deer, pheasants, and rabbits. Seasonal hunting is permitted in the forest, as is off-trail camping.

== See also ==
- List of New York state forests
