= Great Western Turnpike =

The Great Western Turnpike was a series of east–west toll roads that crossed part of New York in the United States. The toll roads that carried this name were:

- The First Great Western Turnpike, extending from Albany to Cherry Valley over a path similar to today's U.S. Route 20 (US 20)
- The Second Great Western Turnpike, extending from Cherry Valley to Sherburne via Cooperstown over a path similar to today's New York State Route 80 (NY 80)
- The Third Great Western Turnpike (Cherry Valley Turnpike), extending from Cherry Valley to Cazenovia over a path similar to today's US 20
- The Fourth Great Western Turnpike, extending the Second Great Western initially from Sherburne to Fabius, and then later extended to Homer, over a path similar to New York State Routes 80 and 13 (NY 80/NY 13)
- The Fifth Great Western Turnpike, extending the Fourth Great Western from Homer to Lake Cayuga near King Ferry over a path similar to today's New York State Route 90 (NY 90)

The First and Third Turnpikes were rebuilt as part of US 20 in the 1920s, bypassing the older NY 5, which passed through several cities.

== See also ==
- Skaneateles Turnpike
- History of Albany, New York
