= Flat Rock State Forest =

Coordinates: 44°50′24.61″N 73°36′39.75″W

Flat Rock State Forest is 1,931-acre (7.81 km^{2}) a New York State Department of Environmental Conservation state forest property located in Altona, New York. It is home to a Sandstone Pavement Barrens. The Sandstone Pavement Barrens community is a narrow regional endemic that is possibly restricted to the northernmost counties of New York, north of the Adirondack Mountains in the northeastern portion of the Great Lakes Ecoregion, where the bedrock is sandstone. The Sandstone Pavement Barrens is concentrated in the Champlain Valley of Clinton and Essex Counties where it reaches large patch size. Several small patch occurrences are reported from the Eastern Ontario and St. Lawrence Lowlands including islands in the Thousand Islands Region. Additional occurrences are suspected from within Lake George.

This community is possibly restricted to the northeastern portion of the Great Lakes Basin and parts of Maine. It may extend into Northern and Central Canada. The narrowly defined jack pine Pinus banksiana dominated barrens are known from northeastern New York, southern Quebec and Maine. Similar communities may also occur in Ontario, Minnesota, and Iowa.

== See also ==
- List of New York state forests
