= Stewart State Forest =

State forest in U.S. state of New York

- Location within New York
- Location: Orange County, New York, US
- Nearest city: Newburgh
- Coordinates: 41.493°N 74.160°W
- Area: 6,700 acres (2,700 ha)
- Established: 1999
- Governing body: New York State Department of Environmental Conservation

Stewart State Forest is a state forest in Orange County, New York, United States. It is located West of Stewart International Airport and North of Rock Tavern. It comprises a mix of wetlands, fields and forest.

It offers 22 miles (35 km) of gravel roads and 18 miles (29 km) of hiking trails. Activities include hiking, biking, horseback riding, hunting, cross country skiing, snowmobiling, bird watching and fishing.

Wildlife includes white-tailed deer, coyotes, bobcats, wild turkeys, great blue herons and hawks.

== History ==
Most of Stewart State Forest land was formerly in farm or residential use. It was acquired in the 1970s by the Metropolitan Transportation Authority (MTA) to establish and develop Stewart International Airport.

In March 1999, New York State Governor George Pataki announced the effective transfer of 5,200 acres from the Department of Transportation (DOT) to the Department of Environmental Conservation (DEC) to permanently preserve the land. Another 1,600 acres were transferred in June 2006.
