= Fabius Village Historic District =

Historic district in New York, United States

- U.S. National Register of Historic Places
- U.S. Historic district
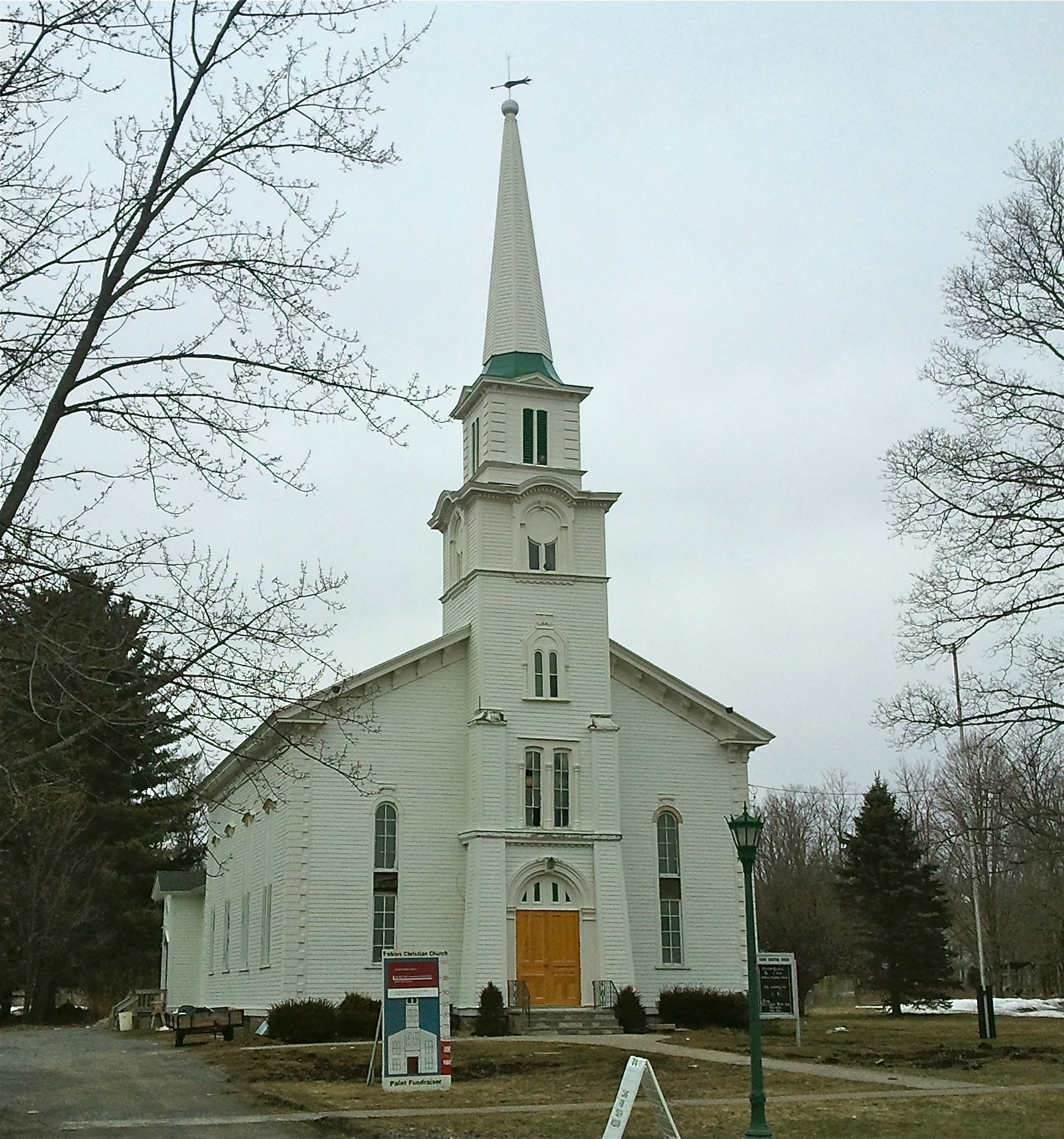
- The First Baptist Church in Fabius Village Historic District

- Location within New York
- Location: Roughly bounded by N. West St., Mill St., Keeney St., and Fabius Town Line, Fabius, New York
- Coordinates: 42°50′5″N 75°59′12″W
- Area: 70 acres (28 ha)
- Architectural style: Federal, Greek Revival, et al.
- NRHP reference No.: 00001409
- Added to NRHP: 22 November 2000

The Fabius Village Historic District in Fabius, New York is a 70-acre (280,000 m^{2}) historic district that was listed on the National Register of Historic Places in 2000. It includes 57 contributing buildings, 2 contributing sites, 2 contributing structures, and 4 contributing objects.

The Historic District is located in Onondaga County, New York.

Contributing properties include:

- First Baptist Church, the most prominent building in the district
- Cemetery of first Baptist church
- Fabius United Methodist Church, 7818 Academy Street, with a denticulated cornice
- Fabius Central School, c. 1930, a collegiate Gothic style school
- 7767 Academy Street, c. 1860, a Gothic Revival style house
- 7771 Academy Street, c. 1870, a Gothic Revival style house
- 7824 Main Street, c. 1840
- Stevens-Wheaton-Hamilton House, 7833 Main Street
- 7763 Main Street, 1830, a Federal style house
- 7764 Main Street, c. 1885, a Queen Anne style house with a 2-story carriage barn
- Fabius Evergreen Cemetery, c. 1860, a rural cemetery
