= Ambler State Forest =

Forest in New York

Ambler State Forest is a forested region in Chenango County, New York, United States. It is part of the Between Rivers Unit Management Plant. The forest consists of native hardwoods and species of softwoods. It covers a land area of 629 acres.

== Location ==
The state forest is located on the hillside that overlooks the Unadilla River valley. It is situated in the town of New Berlin, Chenango County. Nearby locations include Colgate University (20 miles), Oquaga Creek State Park Campground (24 miles), Taylor Lake (21 miles), Verona Beach (47 miles), Chenango County Historical Society museum (4 miles), Hunts Pond State Forest (4 miles), Bannerman Castle (105 miles), and Norwich city (5 miles).

== Wildlife ==
The state forest has a diverse habitat. It is home to black-capped chickadees, red and grey squirrels, golden-crowned kinglets, goshawks, white-tailed deer, cottontail rabbits, red-tailed hawks, and kestrels, among other mammals fish, reptiles, amphibians, and insects.

== Facilities and recreation ==
The activities in this state forests include camping, fishing, hunting, boating, birding, and water sports.
