= Apulia Station, New York =

- Hamlet
- Location within New York Location within the United States
- Coordinates: 42°49′07″N 76°04′21″W
- Country: United States
- State: New York
- County: Onondaga
- Elevation: 1,243 ft (379 m)
- Time zone: UTC-5 (Eastern (EST))
  - Summer (DST): UTC-4 (EDT)
- ZIP code: 13020
- Area codes: 315 & 680
- GNIS feature ID: 942060

Apulia Station is a hamlet in Onondaga County, New York, United States. The community is located along New York State Route 80, 2.4 miles (3.9 km) northeast of Tully. Apulia Station has a post office with ZIP code 13020, which opened on August 17, 1861.
