= Fabius (village), New York =

Fabius, New York
- Village
- Location in Onondaga County and the state of New York.
- Coordinates: 42°50′8″N 75°59′7″W
- Country: United States
- State: New York
- County: Onondaga

Area
  - Total: 0.42 sq mi (1.10 km^{2})
  - Land: 0.42 sq mi (1.10 km^{2})
  - Water: 0 sq mi (0.00 km^{2})

Population (2020)
  - Total: 309
  - Density: 725.4/sq mi (280.06/km^{2})
- Time zone: UTC-5 (Eastern (EST))
  - Summer (DST): UTC-4 (EDT)
- FIPS code: 36-24867

Fabius is a village in Onondaga County, New York, United States. As of the 2020 census, the population was 309. It is part of the Syracuse Metropolitan Statistical Area. The village is near the center of the town of Fabius and is south of Syracuse.

== History ==
The village is within the former Central New York Military Tract and was originally called "Franklinville." Fabius became an incorporated village in 1880. Fabius was named for Quintus Fabius Maximus Verrucosus, a Roman soldier and politician.

The Fabius Village Historic District was listed on the National Register of Historic Places in 2000.

== Geography ==
Fabius is located at 42°50′7″N 75°59′6″W (42.835551, -75.98515).

According to the United States Census Bureau, the village has a total area of 0.4 square mile (1.0 km^{2}), all land.

The village is situated at the intersection of state routes 80 and 91.

== Demographics ==
Historical population
Census	Pop.	Note	%±
1870	378		—
1880	405		7.1%
1890	312		−23.0%
1900	387		24.0%
1910	344		−11.1%
1920	240		−30.2%
1930	267		11.3%
1940	308		15.4%
1950	369		19.8%
1960	378		2.4%
1970	374		−1.1%
1980	367		−1.9%
1990	310		−15.5%
2000	355		14.5%
2010	352		−0.8%
2020	309		−12.2%
U.S. Decennial Census

As of the census of 2000, there were 355 people, 127 households, and 92 families residing in the village. The population density was 885.6 inhabitants per square mile (341.9/km^{2}). There were 137 housing units at an average density of 341.8 per square mile (132.0/km^{2}). The racial makeup of the village was 98.03% White, 1.41% Native American, 0.28% Asian, and 0.28% from two or more races. Hispanic or Latino of any race were 2.25% of the population.

There were 127 households, out of which 38.6% had children under the age of 18 living with them, 60.6% were married couples living together, 9.4% had a female householder with no husband present, and 26.8% were non-families. 22.0% of all households were made up of individuals, and 7.9% had someone living alone who was 65 years of age or older. The average household size was 2.80 and the average family size was 3.23.

In the village, the population was spread out, with 31.5% under the age of 18, 5.1% from 18 to 24, 29.9% from 25 to 44, 23.1% from 45 to 64, and 10.4% who were 65 years of age or older. The median age was 36 years. For every 100 females, there were 85.9 males. For every 100 females age 18 and over, there were 92.9 males.

The median income for a household in the village was $52,321, and the median income for a family was $55,417. Males had a median income of $39,844 versus $26,500 for females. The per capita income for the village was $17,994. About 4.0% of families and 5.5% of the population were below the poverty line, including 12.7% of those under age 18 and none of those age 65 or over.

== Notable person ==
- James J. Belden, former U.S. Congressman
