= Beebe Hill State Forest =

State forest in New York, United States

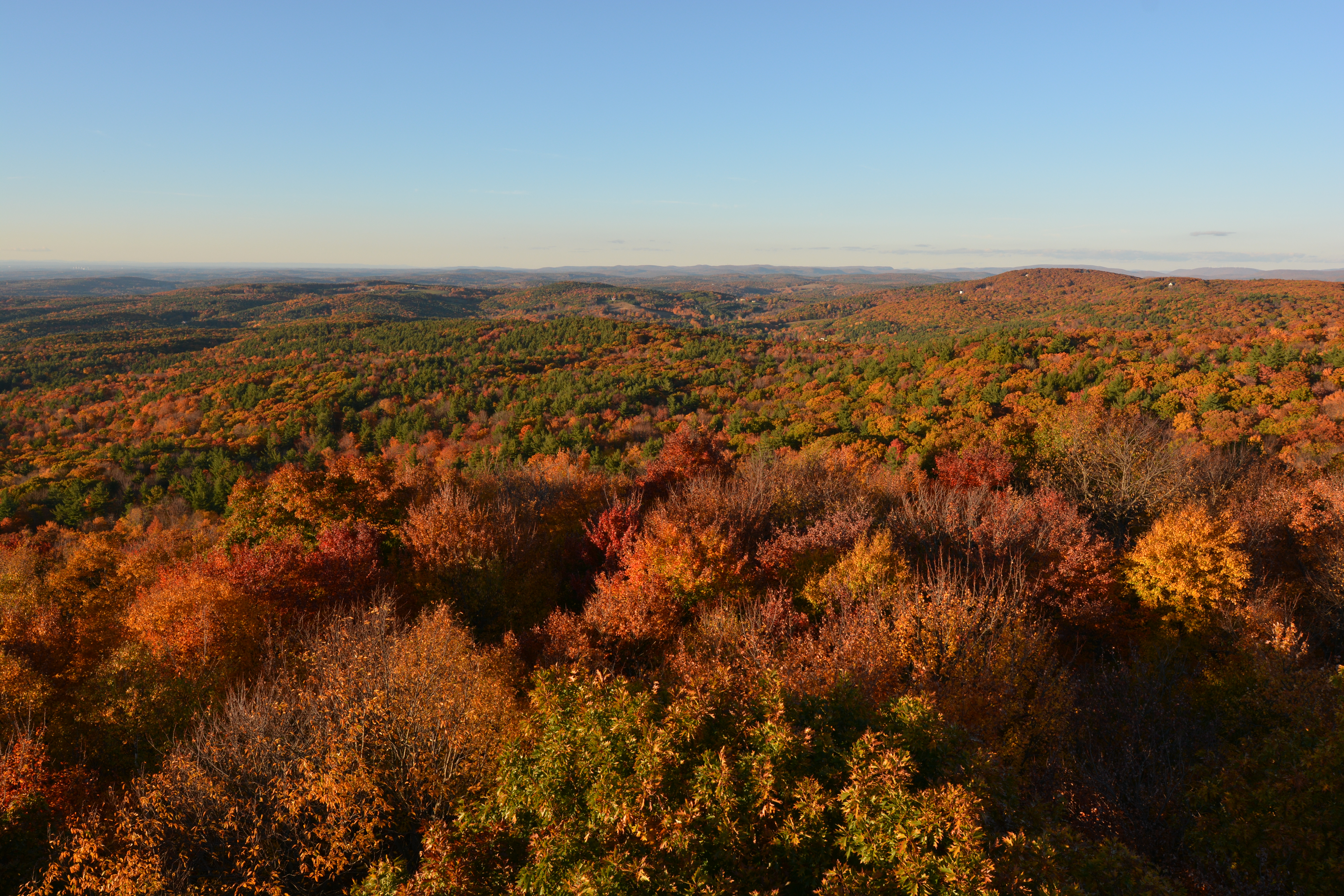
- View looking northeast from the Beebe Hill Fire Tower

- Location within New York
- Location: Austerlitz, Columbia County, New York
- Coordinates: 42°20′20″N 73°28′24″W
- Area: 1,383 acres (560 ha)
- Established: 1963
- Governing body: New York State Department of Environmental Conservation

Beebe Hill State Forest is a state forest in the town of Austerlitz, Columbia County, New York, United States. Compromising 1,383 acres (560 ha) in the Taconic Mountains, it adjoins Harvey Mountain State Forest to the southeast. With around 30 mi (48 km) of multiple-use trails, the area is managed for environmental protection, recreation, and timber harvesting. The 6.5-acre (2.6 ha) Barrett Pond is located within the state forest on the west side of Columbia County Route 5, and was home to numerous fish species when last sampled in 1983.

The defunct Beebe Hill Fire Tower is located on the summit of Beebe Hill at an elevation of 1,726 ft (526 m). As of late 2024, the tower was deemed unsafe, according to the state forest's web site ( see ref#2). Initially constructed in 1928 on Alander Mountain in Massachusetts, the tower was moved to Washburn Mountain in Columbia County in 1933, and finally to Beebe Hill in 1964. It remained in operation until 1987. In 1997, local residents, the Forest Fire Lookout Association, and the New York State Department of Environmental Conservation began efforts to restore the fire tower and establish access through a network of hiking trails. Along the main trail near the fire tower, a lean-to shelter is available for public use.
