= The Saddles State Forest =

New York State Forest

- IUCN category Ib (wilderness area)
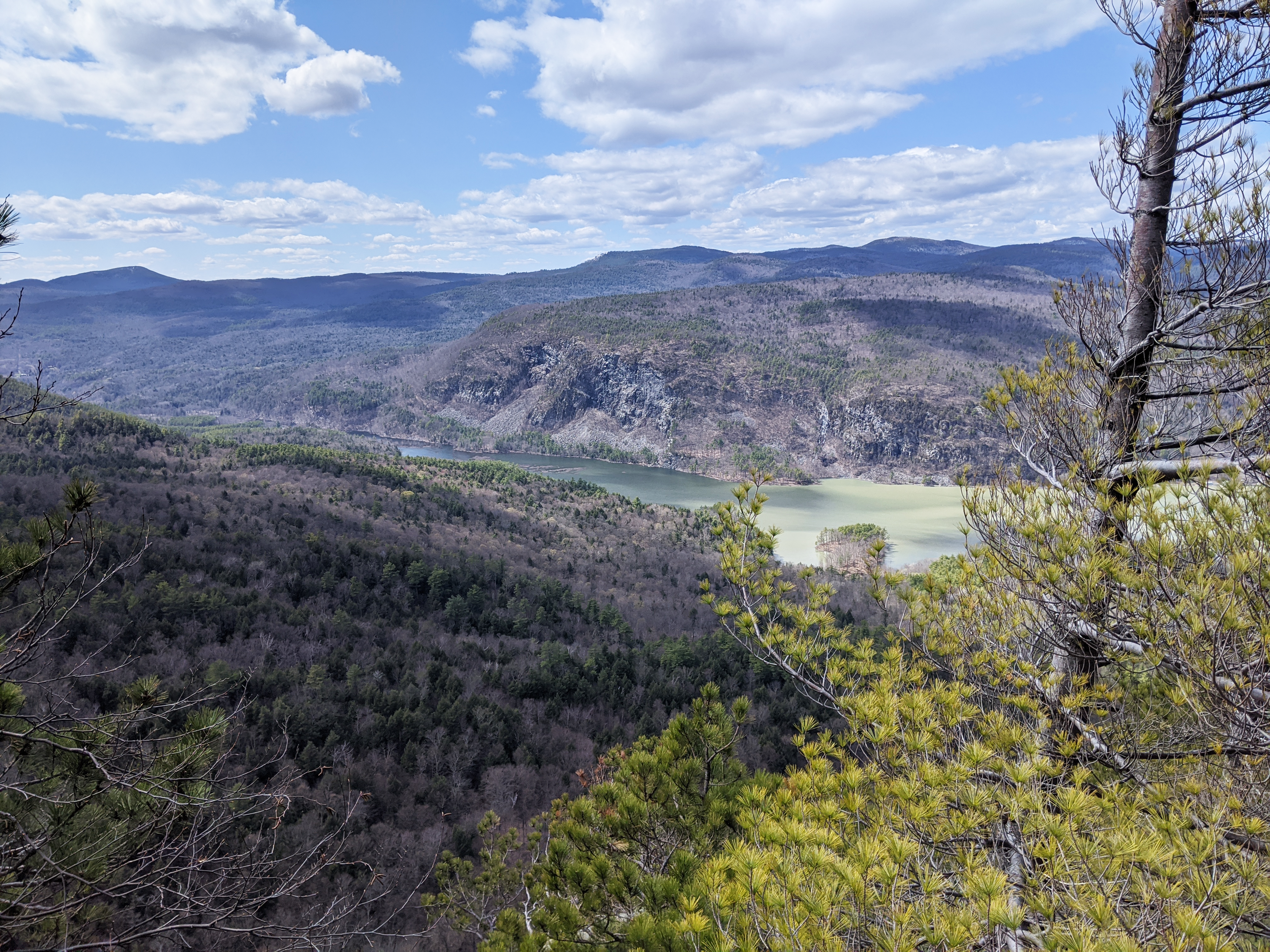
- The South Bay of Lake Champlain seen from The Saddles State Forest

- Location within New York
- Location: Washington County, New York, United States of America
- Nearest city: Whitehall
- Coordinates: 43°31′40″N 73°25′26″W
- Area: 2,471 acres (10.00 km^{2})
- Established: 2013
- Governing body: New York State Department of Environmental Conservation

The Saddles State Forest is a state forest in New York State. The area was purchased by The Nature Conservancy and was sold to the state in 2013. The two peaks that reach 1,600 feet are purportedly the reasoning behind the naming of the forest. The forest contains over 2,250 feet of undeveloped Lake Champlain shoreline. The area is open for recreation year round. A steep unmaintained gravel road from New York State Route 22 provides access to a parking area. There are no marked DEC trails, although unmaintained logging trails and unofficial hiking paths can be found throughout the forest.

Peregrine falcons, bald eagles, and timber rattlesnakes are known to inhabit the area.
