= Beaver Creek State Forest (Madison County) =

State forrest in Madison County, New York

- Location within New York
- Location: Madison County, NY, USA
- Nearest city: Utica, New York
- Coordinates: 42.859°N 75.277°W
- Area: 3,484 acres (1,410 ha)
- Governing body: New York State Department of Environmental Conservation

Beaver Creek State Forest is a state forest in Madison County, New York, United States. It comprises a lowland swamp drained by Beaver Creek and surrounded by forested hills. In addition to native trees these forests contain managed plantations of conifers like Japanese Larch, maintained to provide forest resources like timber and seeds.

It includes 25 miles (40 km) of mixed-use recreational trails in the hills and around the perimeter of the swamp. These are part of the larger Brookfield Trail System, which contains 130 miles (210 km) of trails spanning Beaver Creek, Charles E. Baker, and Brookfield Railroad state forests.
