= Chateaugay State Forest =

Forest in New York State

- Location within New York
- Interactive map of Chateaugay State Forest

Geography
- Location: New York State, United States
- Coordinates: 43.600927°N 75.964914°W
- Area: 4,014 acres (16.24 km^{2})

Administration
- Authority: New York State Department of Environmental Conservation

Chateaugay State Forest is a 4,014 acre New York State Forest in Central New York managed by the New York State Department of Environmental Conservation. On the edge of the Tug Hill Plateau in Oswego County, New York, the area offers snowshoeing, hiking, and cross-country skiing trails. Hunting, trapping, snowmobiling, and fishing are other regulated activities in the area. The area gets a lot of lake effect snow. It is on County Route 2 just east of the hamlet of Orwell, New York.

The land was shaped by glaciers and their melt. It was used for timber and farms. Rock walls that may have been built by Vic Waggoner and George Waggoner of Orwell remain. The walls are remnants of agricultural pursuits that were tried. Geology includes slate and sandstone. Wildlife include red-eyed vireo, wood thrush, blue jay, and red-tailed hawk.

A map of the area shows trails and parking areas as well as Pelin Brook passing through the area. The area offers fall foliage viewing including from a "truck trail".

Chateaugay State Forest is one of various public land areas in Oswego County comprising together some 40,000 acres.

== See also ==
- Chateaugay River
