= Morgan Hill State Forest =

State Forest in Onondaga and Cortland counties in New York State

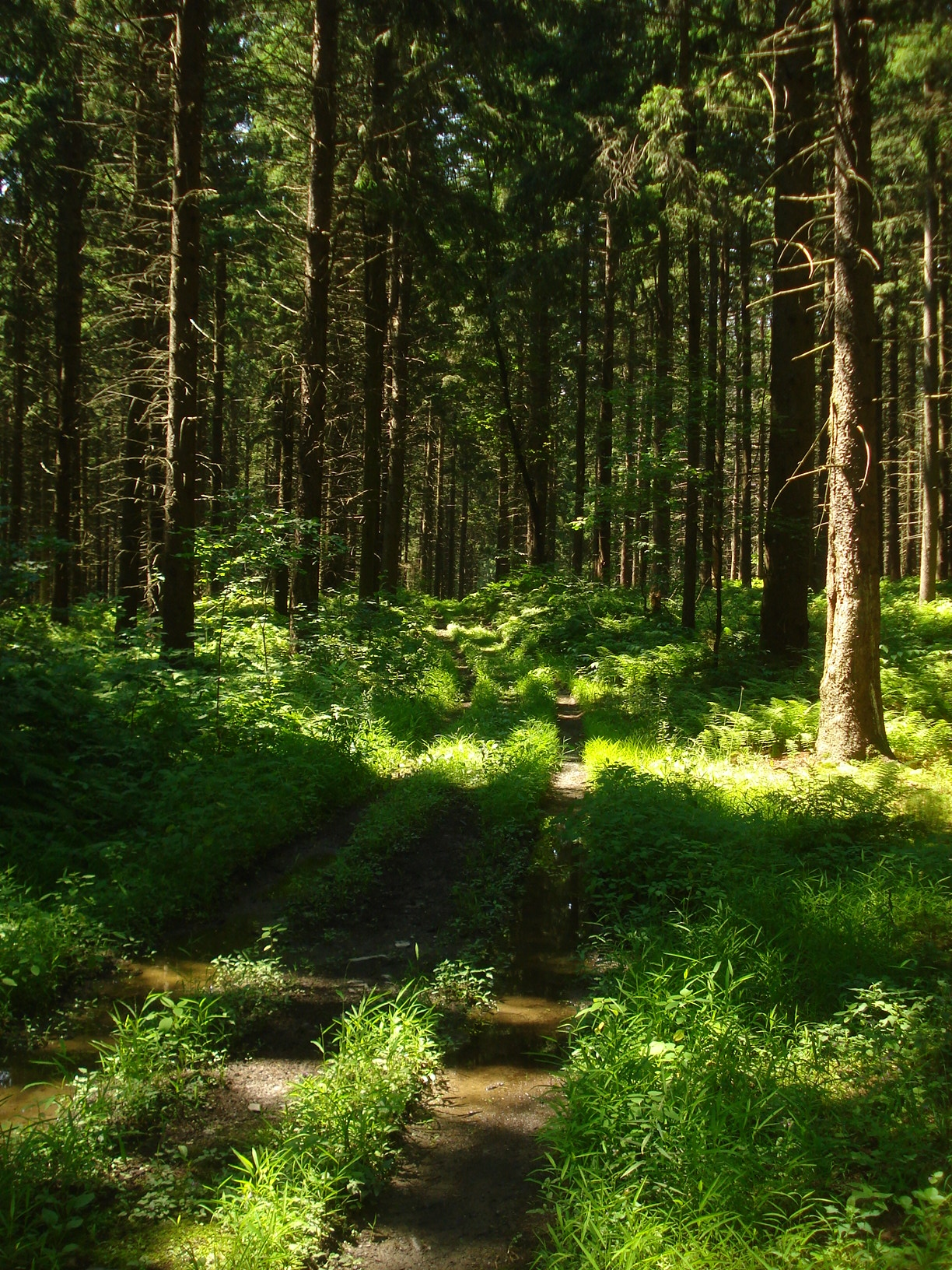
- An old logging road through a pine plantation at Morgan Hill State Forest

- Location within New York
- Location: Onondaga County and Cortland County, NY, USA
- Nearest city: Cortland, New York
- Coordinates: 42.775°N 76.004°W
- Area: 5,284 acres (2,138 ha)
- Governing body: New York State Department of Environmental Conservation

Morgan Hill State Forest is a state forest in Onondaga County and Cortland County, New York, United States.

It includes 11.2 miles (18.0 km) of hiking trails and 11.5 miles (18.5 km) of public forest access roads. The hiking trails are part of the main North Country Trail and Onondaga Branch of the Finger Lakes Trail.

It includes much or all of the Morgan Hill mountain.

== Geography ==
The New York State Department of Environmental Conservation manages Morgan Hill as part of a larger unit of land that includes the neighboring Labrador Hollow Unique Area, and Kettlebail State Forest. Morgan Hill State Forest itself is 5,284 acres of land. 3,108 of those are in Onondaga County, and 2,176 in Cortland County.

The highest point in the forest is 2,020 feet (620 m) above sea level.

Morgan Hill also includes 20 acres of wetland, several streams, and two ponds: Spruce and Shackham.

== Activities ==
Morgan Hill State Forest has hiking and snowmobiling trails.
