= Winona State Forest =

Coordinates: 43°41′50″N 75°58′30″W

Winona State Forest is a 9,223-acre (37.32 km^{2}) protected area (New York State Forests) in southern Jefferson County, New York and northern Oswego County, New York. It is on the western edge of the Tug Hill Plateau east of Interstate 81 and west of the Littlejohn Wildlife Management Area.

Trails in the Winona State Forest are maintained by New York's Department of Environmental Conservation (DEC). Once an area of abandoned farmland, the land was purchased in the early 1930s by New York State for $4 an acre. The Civilian Conservation Corps (CCC) established a work camp and the land was replanted with trees including white spruce, red spruce, larch and Norway spruce. The Civilian Conservation Corps' Mannsville Camp remains in the area. The DEC maintain a 10-year plan for the land.

Winona State Forest offers a variety of winter sports opportunities including cross country skiing, snow mobiling, snowshoeing and ATV riding. If the snow melts, hiking is also available. The park includes a trail that crosses Sandy Creek.

In 2025, Pat McFalls of Oswego rode a bicycle across the United States 4,000 miles from San Francisco to Winona State Forest raising $7,000 the Winona State Forest Recreation Association.

The Tug Hill Challenge is a sled dog race held at Winona State Forest.
