= Truxton station =

Truxton
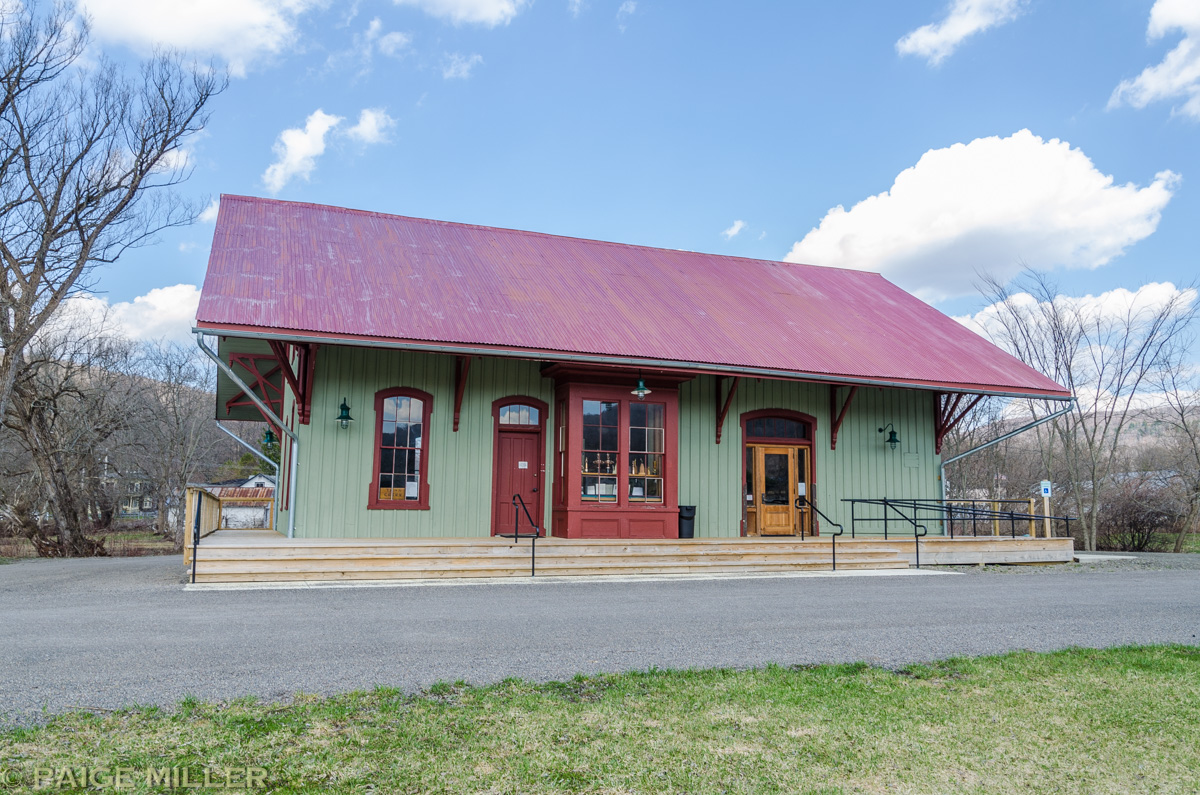
- The former Truxton station in 2015

General information
- Location: Railroad Street, Truxton, New York
- Coordinates: 42°42′39″N 76°1′48″W
- Lines: Elmira and Cortland Branch

Former lines
Preceding station	Lehigh Valley Railroad	Following station
East Homer toward Elmira	Elmira and Cortland Branch	Cuyler toward Camden
- Truxton Depot
- U.S. National Register of Historic Places
- Location within New York Location within the United States
- Location: Railroad St., Truxton, New York
- Coordinates: 42°42′39″N 76°1′48″W
- Area: less than one acre
- Built: 1872
- Architectural style: Late Victorian
- NRHP reference No.: 08000930
- Added to NRHP: September 25, 2008
Location

Truxton Depot, also known as Lehigh Valley Depot, is a historic railway depot located at Truxton in Cortland County, New York. It was built about 1872 by the Lehigh Valley Railroad. It is a small rectangular, one story structure, 50 feet long and 30 feet wide. The building ceased use as a train station in 1967 and was then used by Agway as a warehouse. In 1991, it was sold to the town of Truxton for $1.00. It now serves as the Truxton Town Hall.

It was listed on the National Register of Historic Places in 2008.
