= McCarty Hill =

Mountain in New York, United States

- Location within New York Location within the United States

Highest point
- Elevation: 2,330 feet (710 m)
- Coordinates: 42°15′15″N 78°41′39″W

Geography
- Location: Center of Cattaraugus County, New York, U.S.
- Topo map: USGS Ellicottville

McCarty Hill is a mountain in the Southern Tier of New York. It is located in Cattaraugus County, mostly in Little Valley and Great Valley, with portions in Ellicottville and Mansfield. In 1940, an 82-foot-6-inch-tall (25.15 m) steel fire lookout tower was built on the mountain. The tower ceased fire lookout operations and then officially closed in early 1989. In 1993, the tower was dismantled and removed and replaced with a free-standing communications tower.

== History ==
In 1940, the Civilian Conservation Corps Camp S-106 of Salamanca, New York built an 82-foot-6-inch-tall (25.15 m) International Derrick steel fire lookout tower on the mountain. The tower was initially intended to be on Irish Hill, which is located 6 miles (9.7 km) northeast of McCarty Hill. The tower was first staffed in 1941 and reported 4 fires and 980 visitors. The tower ceased fire lookout operations at the end of the 1988 fire lookout season. The New York State Department of Environmental Conservation (NYSDEC) officially closed the tower in early 1989. Beginning in 1987, the tower hosted repeater antennae for the Cattaraugus County Sheriff's Office (CCSO). A small building was built at the base with a chain link fence to protect the building. In 1993, the NYSDEC made an agreement with the CCSO that the CCSO could build a free-standing tower on the site of the fire lookout tower. The tower was dismantled and removed at the same time the new free-standing tower was constructed.

Both the Holimont Ski Resort and Holiday Valley Resort are constructed on the north-facing side of the mountain. Most of the remainder of the mountain is owned by the state of New York as the Rock City State Forest and McCarty Hill State Forest (New York State Forests). The state offers mountain biking, camping, hiking (via the Finger Lakes Trail), horseback riding, snowmobiling during winter months, and hunting; the southern portion of the state forest includes a geological formation of large boulders resembling a city, hence the Rock City name.
