= Hunts Pond State Park =

State park in Chenango County, New York

- Location within New York
- Type: Former state park
- Location: Town of New Berlin, Chenango County, New York
- Nearest city: New Berlin
- Coordinates: 42°35′33″N 75°22′20″W
- Area: 235 acres (0.95 km^{2})
- Visitors: 4,757 (in 2009)
- Open: All year
- Camp sites: 12 (primitive)
- Other information: Managed since 2011 as part of Hunts Pond State Forest by the New York State Department of Environmental Conservation.

Hunts Pond State Park is a former state park in Chenango County, New York, United States. The former park is located in the town of New Berlin, west of Route 8 and southwest of the village of New Berlin. It has been managed since 2011 as part of Hunts Pond State Forest.

== History ==
The 235-acre (0.95 km^{2}) park was managed by the New York State Office of Parks, Recreation and Historic Preservation prior to 2011, when ownership and management was transferred to the New York State Department of Environmental Conservation. The former park has since been managed as part of Hunts Pond State Forest, a 1,397-acre (5.65 km^{2}) state-managed conservation area.

== Facilities and recreation ==
The former park is dominated by 50-acre (20 ha) Hunts Pond in its center. The land remains accessible by the public, and offers space for hiking, fishing, seasonal deer hunting, cross-country skiing and snowmobiling. A boat launch is available; as a pollution control measure, only non-motorized watercraft are permitted in the lake.

Beginning in 2013, 12 primitive campsites along Hunts Pond's perimeter were once again made available for public use. The campsites are available between May 1 and September 30, and campers are required to obtain a free permit issued by the NYS-DEC's office in Sherburne. Outside of the former Hunts Pond State Park area, primitive camping is permitted throughout Hunts Pond State Forest, pursuant to general state forest regulations.

== See also ==
- List of New York state parks
- List of New York state forests
