= Susquehanna State Forest =

State forest in New York, US

- Location within New York Location within the United States
- Location: Otsego County, NY USA
- Nearest city: Oneonta, New York
- Coordinates: 42°33′31″N 74°56′8″W
- Area: 423 acres (171 ha)
- Governing body: New York State Department of Environmental Conservation

Susquehanna State Forest is a New York State Forest in Otsego County, New York. it has a land area of 423 acres, The Susquehanna river flows through the middle of the forest. A boat ramp is available for patrons to use. Recreational activities are allowed by park management. Hunting is allowed when the time is appropriate and the season is ongoing. Fishing opportunities are similar to that of most of the Susquehanna river. There are no designated trails of any type; only an unpaved road.
