= Rock City State Forest =

New York State Forest the with trails and rock formations

Coordinates: 42°13′10″N 78°42′45″W

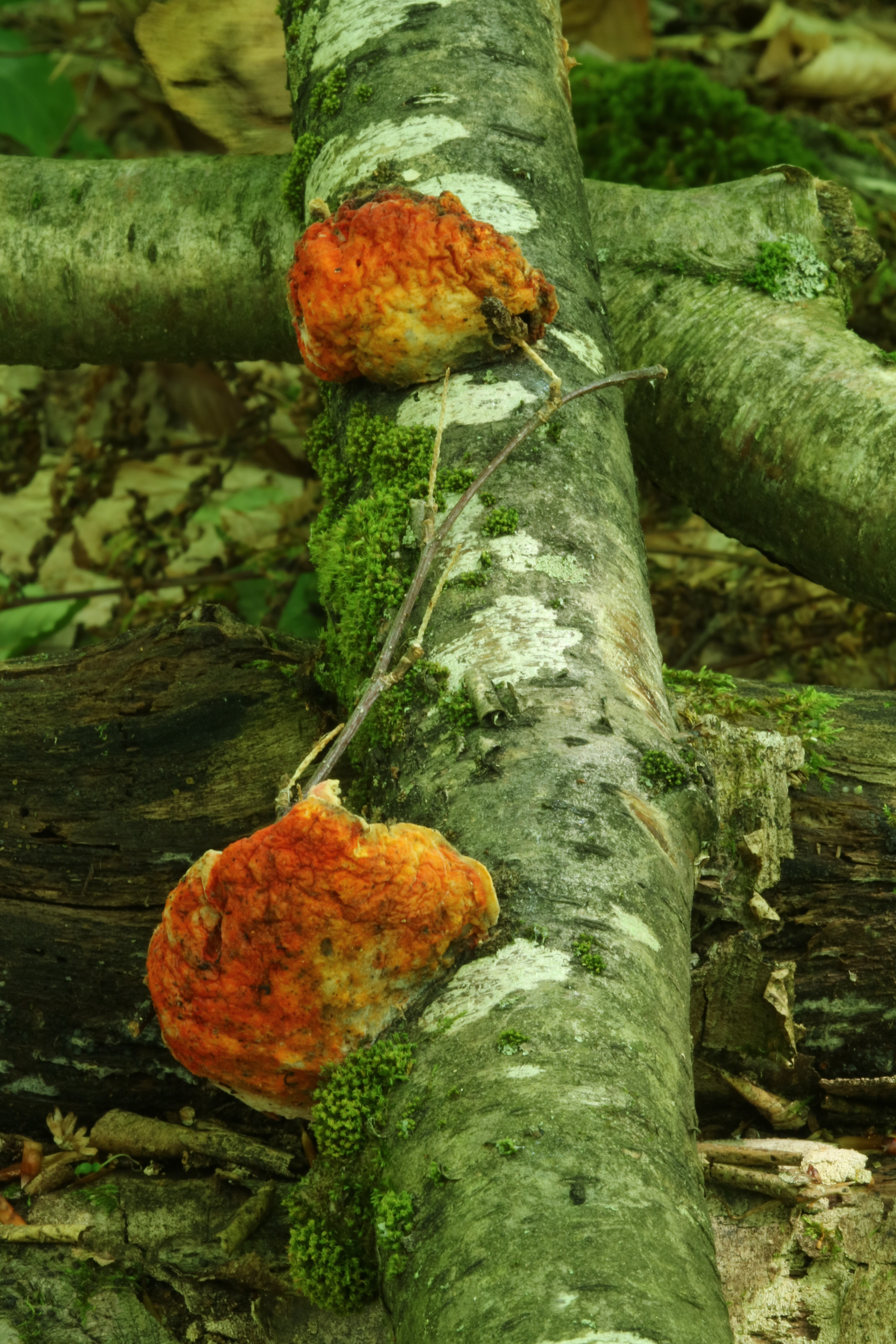
Fungus and lychens growing on a tree branch photographed at Rock City State Forest

Rock City State Forest is a New York State Forest in Cattaraugus County, New York. It cover 2,905 acres. It is named for its Little Rock City rock formations. It borders McCarty Hill State Forest. Various trails are in the preserves including Little Rock City Nature Trail.

Access to the park includes Little Rock City Road near Little Valley, New York.

Little Rock City is in Salamanca, New York and has large rock formations. There are also rock carvings dated to the 1800s. In 1995 the preserves were noted as reforestation areas.

The North Country Trail passes through Rock City State Forest.

== See also ==
- Rock City Park in Olean, New York
