= Labrador Hollow Unique Area =

Protected area in New York, United States

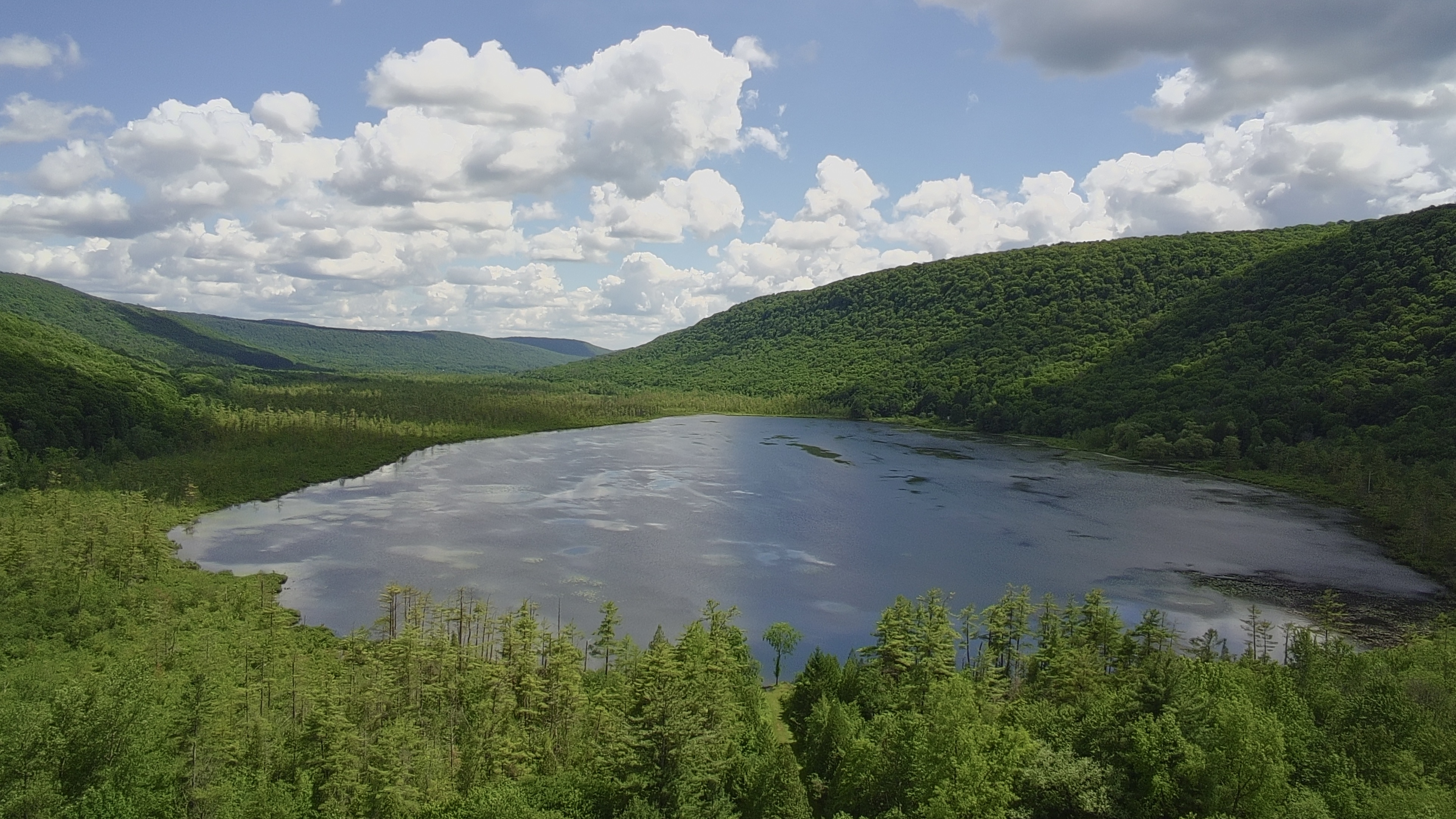
- An aerial view of Labrador Hollow Unique Area, facing north towards Labrador Pond

- Location within New York
- Location: Cortland and Onondaga counties, New York
- Nearest city: Tully, New York
- Coordinates: 42°47′10″N 76°02′46″W
- Area: 1,474 acres (5.97 km^{2})
- Established: 1978
- Governing body: New York State Department of Environmental Conservation

The Labrador Hollow Unique Area is a 1,474-acre (5.97 km^{2}) conservation area located in Cortland and Onondaga counties, New York. The area is located adjacent to and between Kettlebail State Forest and Morgan Hill State Forest, and is managed by the New York State Department of Environmental Conservation. The area is open to the public and includes Labrador Pond and the 50-foot (15 m) Tinker Falls.

Labrador Hollow is a glacially carved valley. The land was sparsely populated throughout the 19th and 20th centuries, though portions were logged or used for farming, including the cultivation of ginseng. New York state purchased the land for preservation purposes between 1974 and 1978, naming it a "Unique Area". Since that time several trails have been developed on the land, including a boardwalk around wetlands by Labrador Pond and a handicapped accessible trail to Tinkers Falls.

== Physical features ==
Labrador Hollow sits within a one-half-mile-wide (0.80 km) glacially carved valley with steep walls. The valley's orientation and topography cause it to be shaded for most of the day, leading to cooler conditions and plant life more typical of mountain bogs such as those found in the Adirondacks. 336 acres (1.36 km^{2}) of Labrador Hollow are classified as freshwater wetlands.

The valley ends to the north at a roughly 100-foot (30 m) hill, which divides water that flows south into Labrador Creek (and is part of the Susquehanna River watershed) from water that flows north into Butternut Creek (and eventually reaches the St. Lawrence River). The unique area is situated between Kettlebail State Forest and Morgan Hill State Forest, and its 1,474 acres (5.97 km^{2}) are split between Cortland County (714 acres (2.89 km^{2})) and Onondaga County (760 acres (3.1 km^{2})), New York. A paved county paved roads travel north to south through the unique area.

=== Tinker Falls ===
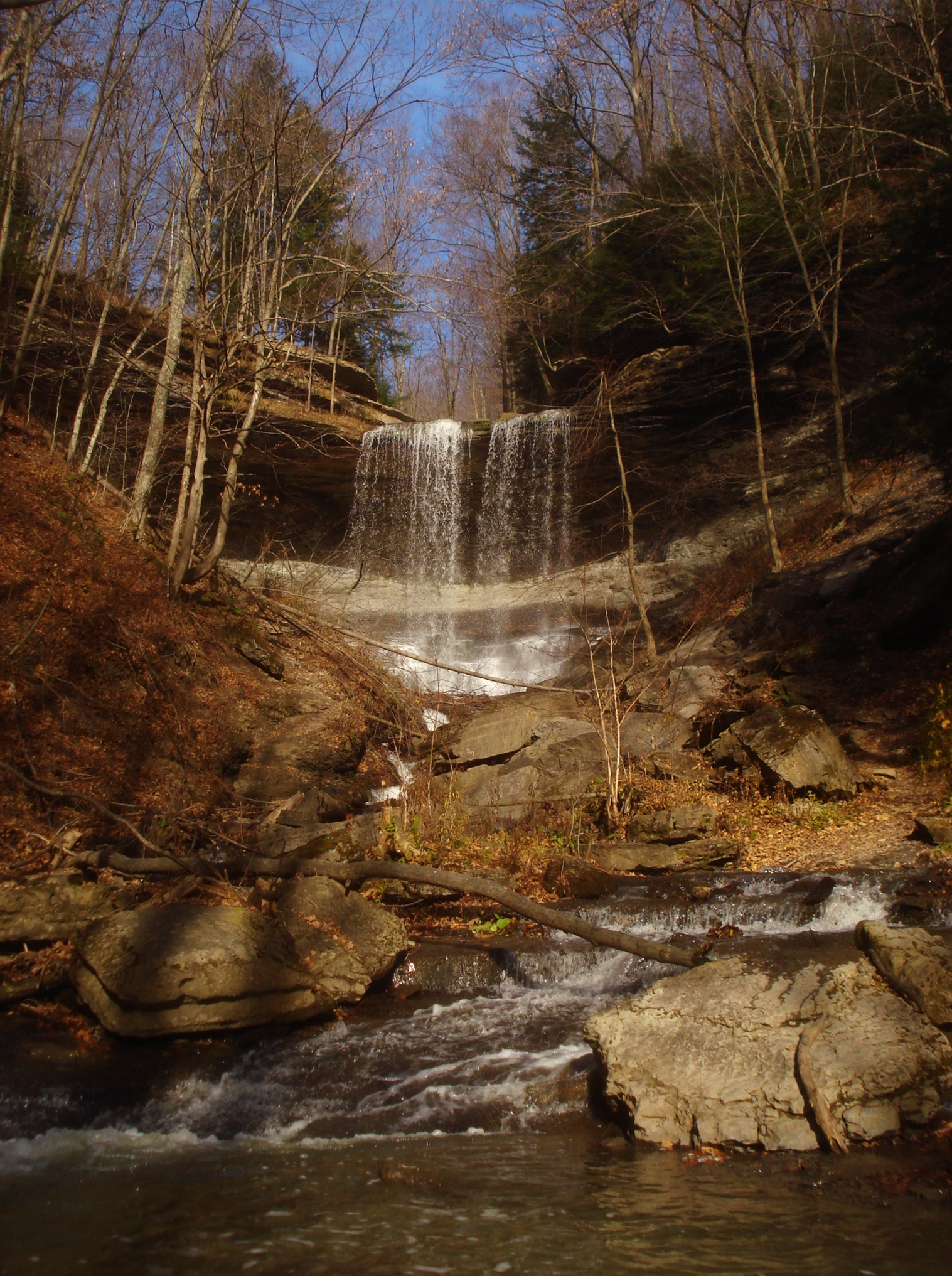
Tinker Falls

Tinker Falls (also known as Tinkers Falls) is a waterfall approximately 50 feet (15 m) in height. The falls are formed by a small stream which cut a gorge through shale above a 20-to-30-foot-thick (6.1 to 9.1 m) layer of limestone, which rests atop more shale. As the limestone shelf eroded much slower than the more easily eroded shale below, a waterfall with a recessed amphitheater was formed.

=== Labrador Pond ===
Labrador Pond is 102 acres (41 ha) in size, and is shallow throughout, with a maximum depth of four to five feet (1.2 to 1.5 m). The pond floor is largely muck, that can be as deep as 30 feet (9.1 m). It supports a variety of warm-water fish species, and contains significant aquatic vegetation.

A major tributary to the pond is Shackham Brook. The pond's outflow is Labrador Creek, which flows into the east branch of the Tioughnioga River.

== History ==
There is no documentation of Native American presence in the valley prior to European settlement. Portions of trees were logged in the 1800s. In 1908, William Martin Beauchamp described Labrador Pond as being surrounded by "thick and marshy woods". The land around Labrador Pond was a noted area for cultivating ginseng in the early 20th century. In 1905, the Syracuse Herald-Journal reported that it had been "pronounced by experts to be the most desirable" land for growing ginseng in the United States.

In the 1970s, local environmentalists became concerned with preserving the land around Labrador Pond. The preservation group "Save the County" (based in Onondaga County), conducted walkathons to fund land purchases in the interest of preservation. Around the same time, New York State began considering purchasing the land with funds raised by its 1972 Environmental Quality Bond Act. In 1974, the State announced that it had approved up to $500,000 for the purpose of purchasing 900 acres (360 ha) of largely undeveloped land around Labrador Pond from private landowners. At the time, there were several farms and, according to The Post-Standard, "fewer than a dozen homes" on the land, but many landowners were unwilling to sell. Negotiations took several years, and in 1978, the State announced that it had reached agreements to purchase 1,000 acres (400 ha). The area opened in April 1978. An additional 307 acres (124 ha) of land were transferred from Morgan Hill State Forest to Labrador Hollow in 1984.

In the 1980s, the area had a forest ranger. A wooden boardwalk in the wetlands by Labrador Pond opened in October 1985, and repaired in a 2004-2008 DEC project, when the wood was replaced with wood–plastic composite. As part of the same repair project, a handicapped accessible path was developed to Tinker Falls, and boardwalk installed by the boat launch. In 2013-2014, the state DEC, in partnership with the Adirondack Mountain Club, developed a stone staircase that went to the amphitheater behind Tinker Fall, and another that went to the top of the falls.

== Ecology ==
Labrador Hollow contains a forested peatland of red maples and conifers. Studies conducted in the early 2000s estimated that 75-80% of the peatland was covered with sphagnum mosses. Amphibians including spotted salamanders live and breed in the unique area and nearby state forests. Although a 1982 inventory of species in Labrador Hollow found

Species of fish that can be found in Labrador Pond include chain pickerel, largemouth bass, yellow perch, pumpkinseed, bluegill, common carp, and brown bullhead. Waterfowl, dragonflies, and several mammal species also live in and around the pond.

== Recreation and facilities ==
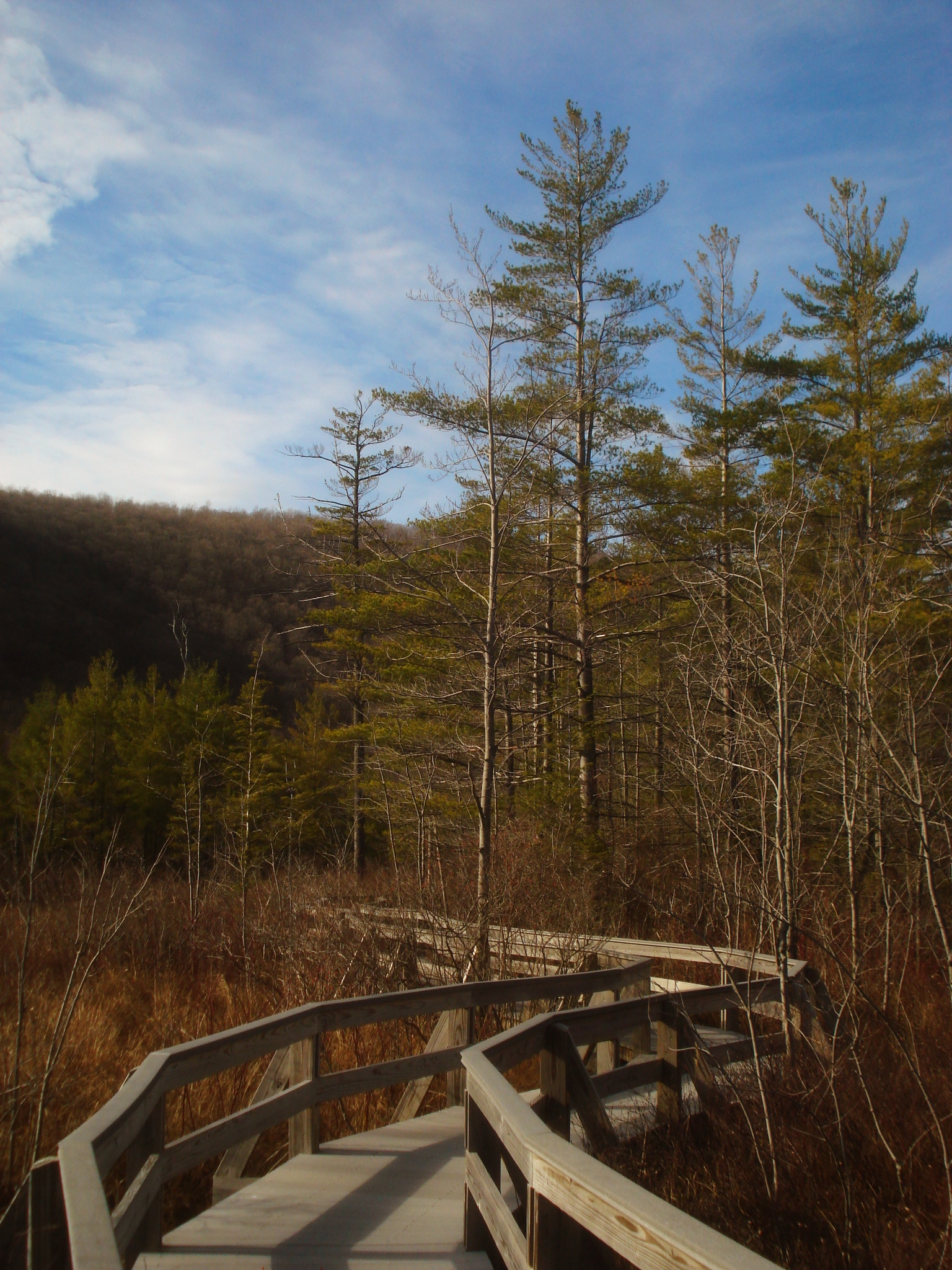
Boardwalk through the wetlands at the north end of Labrador Pond

Labrador Hollow Unique Area is open to the public for recreation including hiking, snowshoeing, cross-country skiing, nature viewing, fishing, hunting, and non-motorized boating. A hang glider launch is located on a hillside in the eastern portion of the area.

In addition to 4.8 miles (7.7 km) of trails that are maintained within the area, a 2,000-foot (0.38 mi; 0.61 km) handicapped-accessible boardwalk is available within the wetlands at the northern end of Labrador Pond. Additional accessible features include a fishing pier along the pond's western shore, and a trail to view Tinkers Falls from near its base.

Fishing is permitted from a pier constructed on the western shore, or from non-motorized boats that may be hand-launched from the same location. To protect the sensitive shoreline habitat, shore fishing is not permitted.

Prohibited activities within the unique area include camping and the building of fires, although primitive camping is permitted in the adjacent state forest properties.

== See also ==
- List of New York state forests
