= Tully (village), New York =

Tully, New York
- Village
- Location in Onondaga County and the state of New York.
- Coordinates: 42°47′52″N 76°6′23″W
- Country: United States
- State: New York
- County: Onondaga

Government
  - Type: Village Board
  - Mayor: Erin Goodfellow

Area
  - Total: 0.73 sq mi (1.89 km^{2})
  - Land: 0.73 sq mi (1.89 km^{2})
  - Water: 0 sq mi (0.00 km^{2})

Population (2020)
  - Total: 904
  - Density: 1,237.5/sq mi (477.79/km^{2})
- Time zone: UTC-5 (Eastern (EST))
  - Summer (DST): UTC-4 (EDT)
- FIPS code: 36-75627
- Website: villageoftully.us

Tully is a village in Onondaga County, New York, United States. As of the 2020 census, the population was 904. The name of the village is derived from that of Roman orator Marcus Tullius Cicero. The village of Tully is in the southeastern part of the town of Tully and is south of Syracuse.

== History ==
The village was in the former Central New York Military Tract. The community was first settled by outsiders circa 1795 and was incorporated as a village in 1875.

== Geography ==
Tully is located at 42°47′51″N 76°6′23″W (42.797655, -76.106434).

According to the United States Census Bureau, the village has a total area of 0.6 square miles (1.7 km^{2}), all land.

Tully is on U.S. Route 11 at the intersection of New York State Route 80.

== Demographics ==
Historical population
Census	Pop.	Note	%±
1880	434		—
1890	498		14.7%
1900	574		15.3%
1910	551		−4.0%
1920	477		−13.4%
1930	680		42.6%
1940	719		5.7%
1950	744		3.5%
1960	803		7.9%
1970	899		12.0%
1980	1,049		16.7%
1990	911		−13.2%
2000	924		1.4%
2010	873		−5.5%
2020	904		3.6%
U.S. Decennial Census

As of the census of 2000, there were 924 people, 404 households, and 242 families residing in the village. The population density was 1,432.6 inhabitants per square mile (553.1/km^{2}). There were 431 housing units at an average density of 668.3 per square mile (258.0/km^{2}). The racial makeup of the village was 97.62% White, 0.11% Black or African American, 0.43% Native American, 0.11% Asian, 0.43% from other races, and 1.30% from two or more races. Hispanic or Latino of any race were 0.76% of the population.

There were 404 households, out of which 33.4% had children under the age of 18 living with them, 40.6% were married couples living together, 14.9% had a female householder with no husband present, and 39.9% were non-families. 32.7% of all households were made up of individuals, and 16.8% had someone living alone who was 65 years of age or older. The average household size was 2.29 and the average family size was 2.89.

In the village, the population was spread out, with 26.4% under the age of 18, 7.4% from 18 to 24, 33.1% from 25 to 44, 20.2% from 45 to 64, and 12.9% who were 65 years of age or older. The median age was 35 years. For every 100 females, there were 88.6 males. For every 100 females age 18 and over, there were 81.3 males.

The median income for a household in the village was $39,000, and the median income for a family was $46,563. Males had a median income of $35,375 versus $21,902 for females. The per capita income for the village was $19,688. About 6.0% of families and 9.9% of the population were below the poverty line, including 18.8% of those under age 18 and 8.0% of those age 65 or over.

== Schools ==
Schools in Tully date back to Miss Ruth Thorpe, who established a place of learning in Timothy Walker's barn in 1801. The district received its first charter from the Board of Regents to form a high school in 1898. The centralization of the Tully school district occurred in 1930. The centralized school was housed in the current elementary school building with both younger students and high schoolers in the same building.

== In popular culture ==
Tully is mentioned in the "Mirror Image" episode of the original Twilight Zone series.
