= Butternut =

Butternut may refer to:

- Butternut (tree), Juglans cinerea, a species of walnut tree commonly called a butternut tree
- Butternut squash, Cucurbita moschata, an edible winter squash
- USS Butternut (YAG-60), a 1941 ship of the United States Navy
- Butternut Breads, a regional brand marketed by Flowers Foods
- Butternut (people), a nineteenth-century term for Southern settlers of the American old Northwest

== Places ==
- Butternut, Wisconsin, a village
- Butternuts, New York, a town
- Butternut, Minnesota, an unincorporated community
- Butternut Lake (Meeker County, Minnesota), a lake
- Butternut Valley Township, Blue Earth County, Minnesota, a township
- Ski Butternut, a ski resort in Great Barrington, Massachusetts

== See also ==
- Butternut Creek (disambiguation)
- Butternut Valley (disambiguation)
