= DeWitt, New York =

Town in New York, United States

- Town
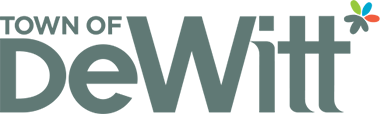
- Logo

- Location in Onondaga County and the state of New York.
- Coordinates: 43°3′16″N 76°4′45″W
- Country: United States
- State: New York
- County: Onondaga

Government
  - Type: Town Council
  - Town Supervisor: Maxwell Ruckdeschel (D)
  - Town Council: Members' List: • H Bernard Alex (D); • Joe Chiarenza (D); • Kerry Mannion (D); • Jack Dooling (D); • Sarah Klee Hood (D); • Max Ruckdeschel (D)

Area
  - Total: 33.87 sq mi (87.71 km^{2})
  - Land: 33.77 sq mi (87.47 km^{2})
  - Water: 0.093 sq mi (0.24 km^{2})
- Elevation: 417 ft (127 m)

Population (2020)
  - Total: 26,074
  - Density: 772.1/sq mi (298.1/km^{2})
- Time zone: UTC-5 (Eastern (EST))
  - Summer (DST): UTC-4 (EDT)
- ZIP Codes: 13214 (De Witt); 13057 (East Syracuse); 13078 (Jamesville); 13206, 13224 (Syracuse); 13211 (Mattydale); 13104 (Manlius)
- Area code: 315
- FIPS code: 36-20478
- GNIS feature ID: 0978901
- Website: www.dewittny.gov

DeWitt is a town in Onondaga County, New York, United States. As of the 2020 census, the population was 26,074. The town is named after major Moses DeWitt, a judge and soldier. An eastern suburb of Syracuse, DeWitt also is the site of most of the campus and all of the academic buildings of Le Moyne College.

== History ==
DeWitt was part of the Central New York Military Tract. The first settlers arrived around 1789.

The original Erie Canal progressed through the town in 1825. DeWitt was formed in 1835 from the Town of Manlius and was named in honor of Moses DeWitt, a major in the militia, a county judge, and one of the first settlers of the county.

== Geography ==
According to the United States Census Bureau, the town has a total area of 33.9 square miles (88 km^{2}), of which 33.8 square miles (88 km^{2}) is land and 0.1 square miles (0.26 km^{2}) (0.15%) is water.

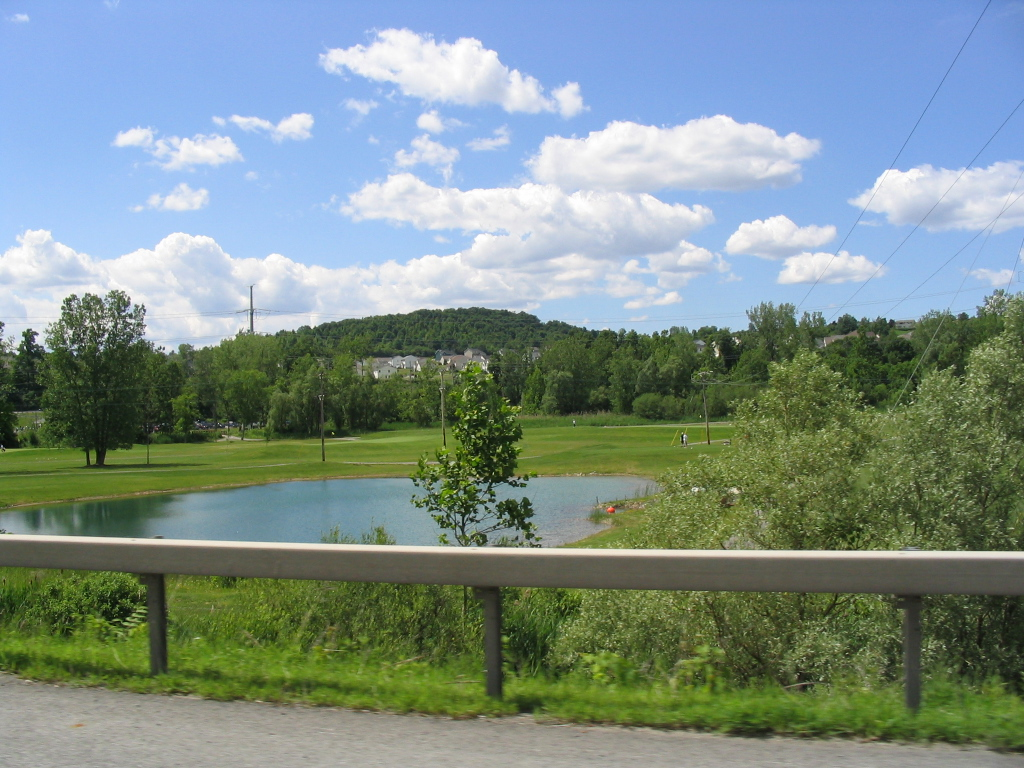
Southern DeWitt from I-481

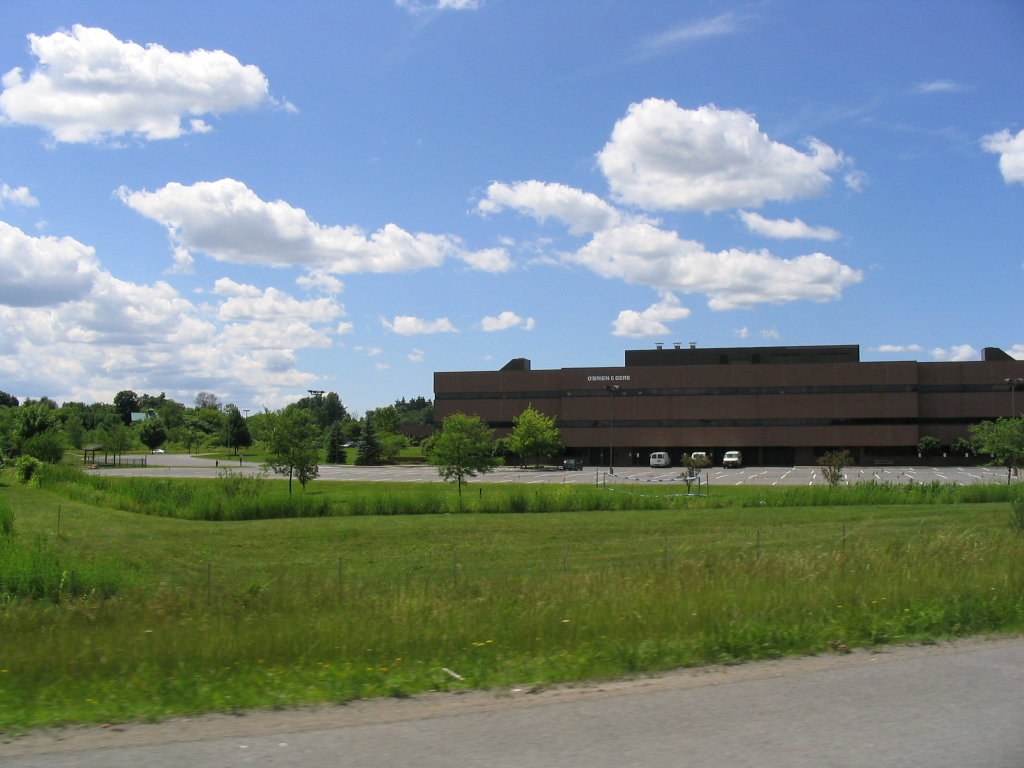
An Office Building off I-481 in the flat northern part of DeWitt.

=== Highways ===
Interstate 81 is the major highway in DeWitt crossing the center of the town and turning northward along the eastern side of DeWitt. I-81 intersects Interstate 690 in the eastern part of the town and Interstate 90 (New York State Thruway) in the northern part of the town.

New York State Route 92 conjoined with New York State Route 5 intersects I-81 in the east part of DeWitt. New York State Route 91 has its northern terminus at New York State Route 173, which crosses the southern part of the town at Jamesville. New York State Route 298 crosses the northern part of the town, while New York State Route 290 crosses the middle portion of the town. Other state routes of note include New York State Route 598 in the extreme northwest portion of the town and New York State Route 635, which straddles the western town boundary with the City of Syracuse.

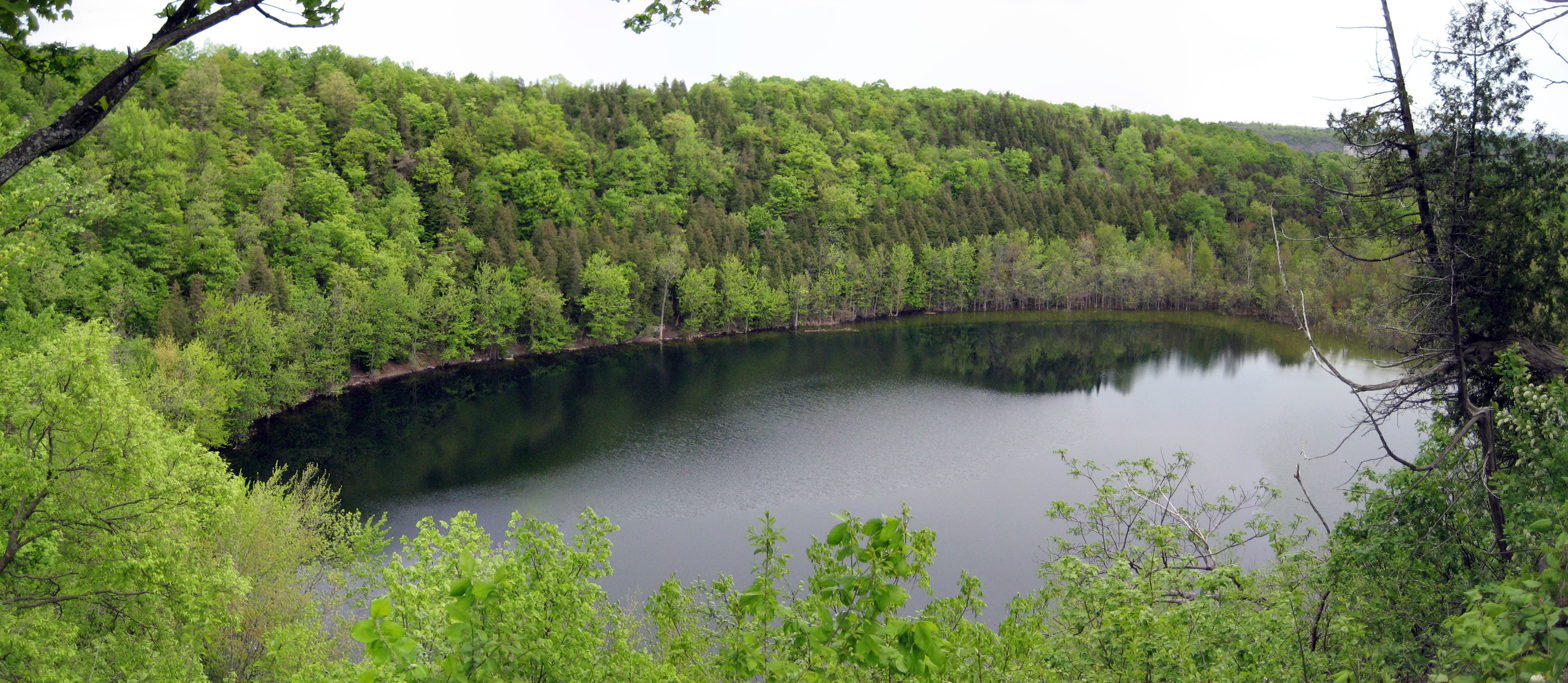
Glacier Lake, Clark Reservation State Park

=== Bodies of water ===
Natural bodies of water in the Town of DeWitt include:

- Butternut Creek flows from south of Jamesville Reservoir, under the Erie Canal, and north and east to Limestone Creek, which in turn flows into Chittenango Creek, and ultimately into Oneida Lake
- Meadow Brook, a tributary of Butternut Creek, flows east from Syracuse to DeWitt
- Glacier Lake at Clark Reservation State Park
- Ley Creek (South Branch) flows north and west from near Erie Boulevard in DeWitt, ultimately to Onondaga Lake
- White Lake, a natural area near Clark Reservation.

=== Erie Canal ===
The Long Level section of the Old Erie Canal runs through DeWitt, which in turn is part of the Erie Canalway National Heritage Corridor.

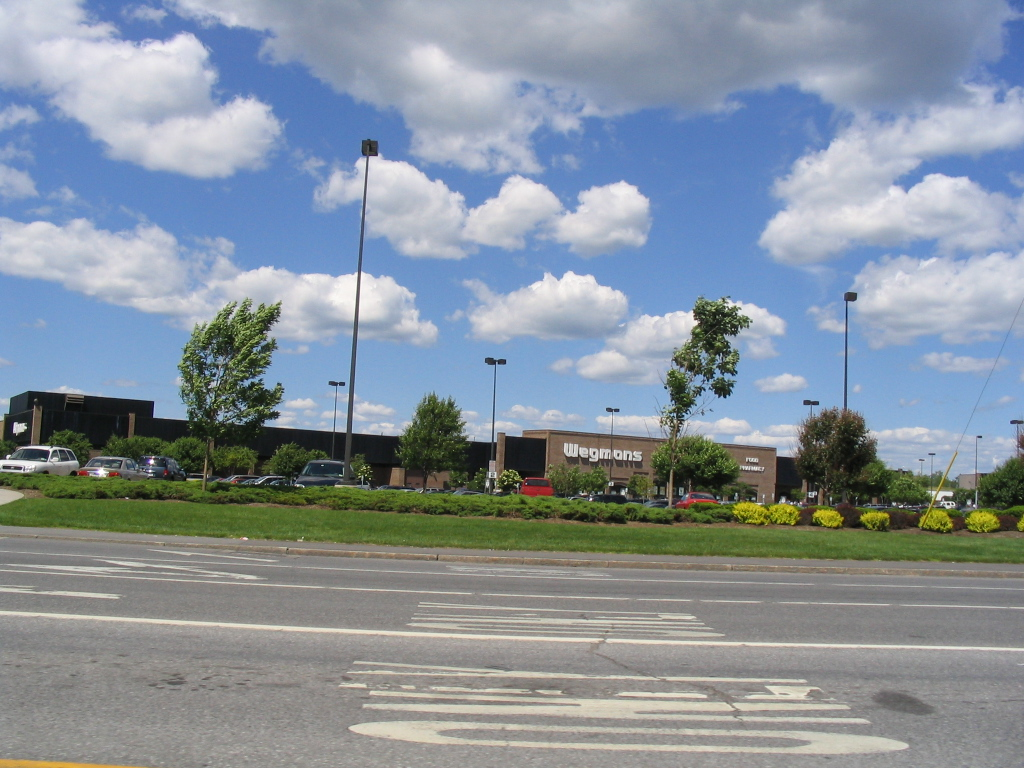
Wegmans DeWitt supermarket

== Demographics ==
As of the 2000 United States Census, there were 24,071 people, 10,068 households, and 6,503 families residing in the town. The population density was 711.0 inhabitants per square mile (274.5/km^{2}). There were 10,694 housing units at an average density of 315.9 per square mile (122.0/km^{2}). The racial makeup of the town was 89.70% White, 4.89% African American, 2.98% Asian, 0.56% Native American, 0.02% Pacific Islander, 0.26% from other races, and 1.58% from two or more races. Hispanic or Latino of any race were 1.35% of the population.

Historical population
Census	Pop.	Note	%±
1840	2,802		—
1850	3,302		17.8%
1860	3,043		−7.8%
1870	3,105		2.0%
1880	3,975		28.0%
1890	4,560		14.7%
1900	5,435		19.2%
1910	7,422		36.6%
1920	10,279		38.5%
1930	9,536		−7.2%
1940	10,836		13.6%
1950	15,329		41.5%
1960	22,740		48.3%
1970	29,198		28.4%
1980	26,868		−8.0%
1990	25,148		−6.4%
2000	24,937		−0.8%
2010	25,838		3.6%
2020	26,074		0.9%
U.S. Decennial Census

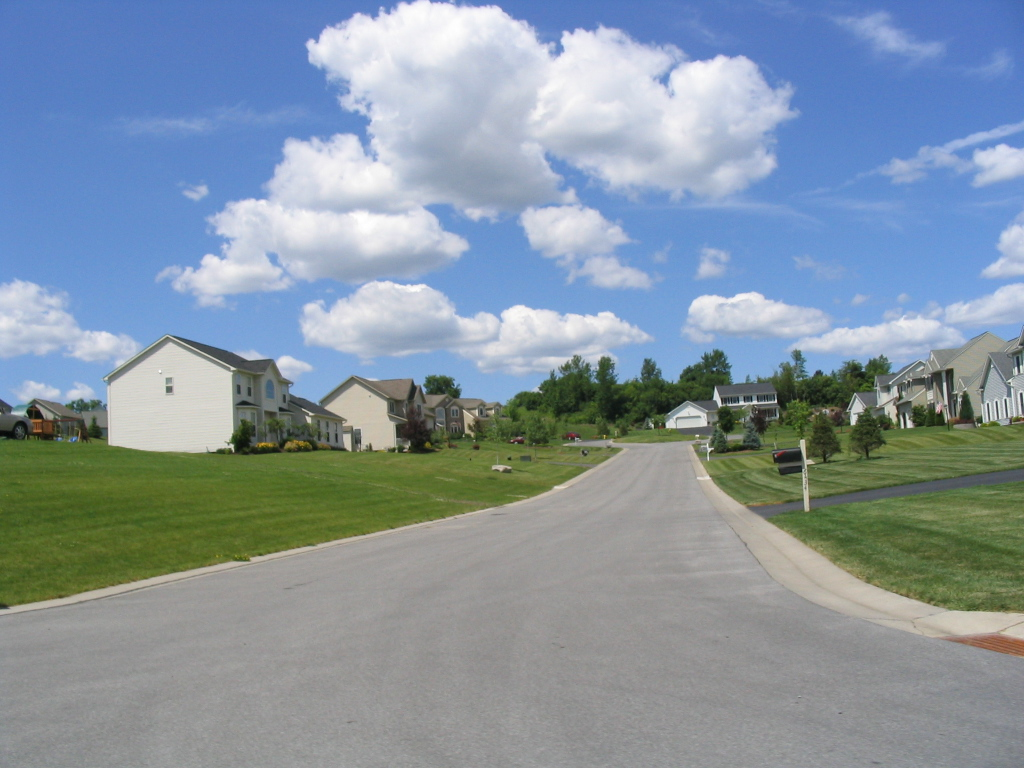
A neighborhood in the hills of DeWitt

There were 10,068 households, out of which 30.0% had children under the age of 18 living with them, 50.2% were married couples living together, 10.7% had a female householder with no husband present, and 35.4% were non-families. 30.9% of all households were made up of individuals, and 13.4% had someone living alone who was 65 years of age or older. The average household size was 2.35 and the average family size was 2.94.

The age distribution was as follows: 24.1% of residents were under the age of 18, 5.6% from 18 to 24, 27.0% from 25 to 44, 25.0% from 45 to 64, and 18.3% who were 65 years of age or older. The median age was 41 years. For every 100 females, there were 91.6 males. For every 100 females age 18 and over, there were 88.3 males.

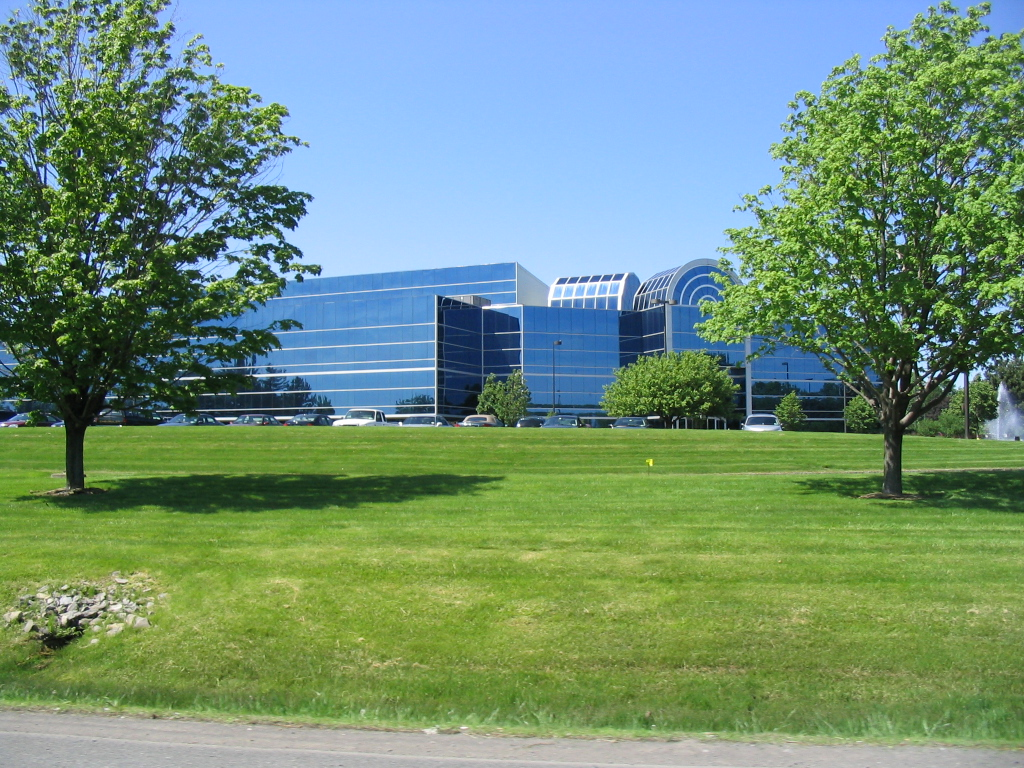
An office building in DeWitt. Outside of downtown Syracuse, DeWitt is home to the most employers in the region.

The median income for a household in the town was $46,759, and the median income for a family was $60,325. Males had a median income of $45,926 versus $29,797 for females. The per capita income for the town was $29,198. About 4.7% of families and 7.2% of the population were below the poverty line, including 9.4% of those under age 18 and 3.7% of those age 65 or over.

As of July 2009, the population was 24,422, up 1.5% from 2000, with the average household income at $57,273. The average condo value in 2009 was $142,735.

Towns in Onondaga County, New York

== Government ==
Officials in the Town of DeWitt are elected at-large. Current offices are:

- Town Supervisor (two-year term of office)
- Town Clerk (two-year term of office)
- Six Town Councilors (four-year term of office)
- Two Town Justices (four-year term of office)
- Town Highway Superintendent (two-year term of office)

The Town Hall is located at 5400 Butternut Drive, East Syracuse, NY 13057-8510.

The current Town Supervisor is Maxwell Ruckdeschel, who took office in 2026.

== Economy ==
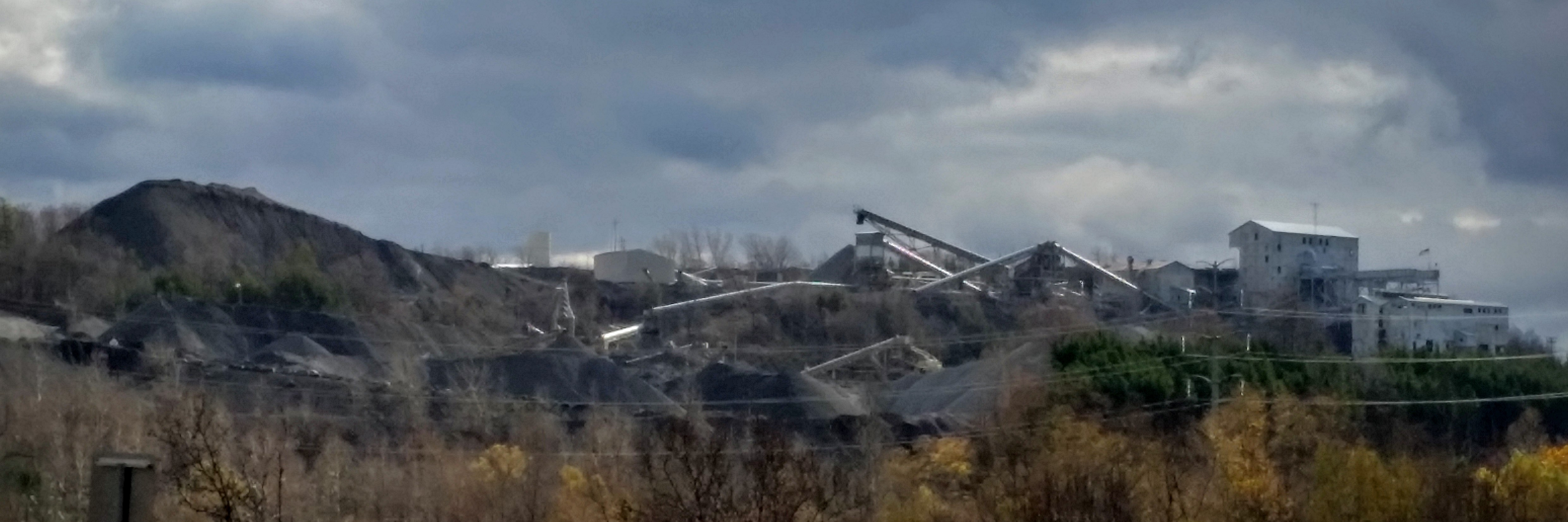
Hanson Aggregates, Jamesville, NY

- Aspen Dental was founded in the town, near East Syracuse
- Carrier Corporation has an engineering and design center, known locally as Carrier Campus, located in DeWitt
- Community Bank, N.A. is headquartered on Widewaters Parkway.
- Hanson Aggregates owns and operates the Jamesville Quarry

== Notable people ==
- Jim Boeheim, head basketball coach at Syracuse University from 1976 to 2023
- Elizabeth Bunnell Read, journalist and suffragist

== Communities and places ==
Village

- East Syracuse – A village east of the Eastwood neighborhood of the City of Syracuse.

Hamlets

- Collamer (formerly "Brittons Settlement") – A hamlet in the northeastern part of DeWitt on NY-298.
- DeWitt (formerly "Youngsville" and "Orville") – The hamlet of DeWitt is near the town center on NY-5.
- Franklin Park – A suburban hamlet in the northwestern part of DeWitt.
- Lyndon Corners – A hamlet in the eastern portion of town.
- Jamesville – A hamlet in the south of DeWitt on NY-173.
- Oot Park – A hamlet by the eastern town line.

Other

- DeWitt Acres – A residential neighborhood next to ShoppingTown Mall.
- Hancock Field Air National Guard Base – A United States Air Force base home to the New York Air National Guard's 174th Attack Wing (174 ATW), and the 274th Air Support Operations Squadron (274 ASOS).
- Messina Springs – A small community near East Syracuse, settled in the early 19th century.
- Morehouse Flats – An early community located north of Jamesville.
- Onondaga County Department of Correction – A jail located east of Jamesville on NY-173.
- Syracuse Hancock International Airport – Half the airport is in the northwestern section of DeWitt.

== Visitor attractions ==
National historic sites

- Erie Canalway National Heritage Corridor
- Dr. John Ives House
- Saint Mark's Church, Jamesville
- Southwood Two-Teacher School, Jamesville

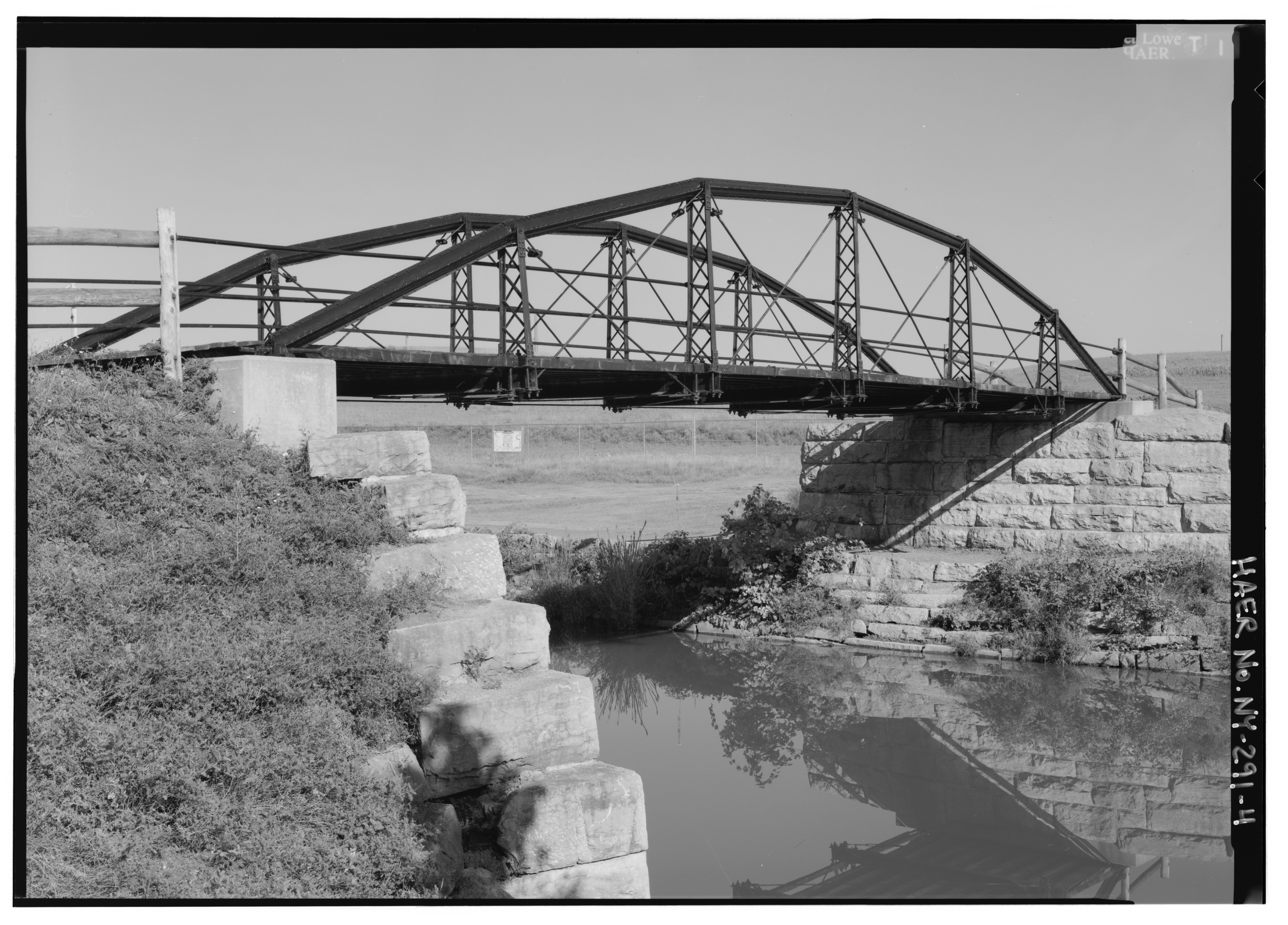
Cooper's Tubular Arch Bridge, Old Erie Canal State Historic Park, DeWitt

State parks and historic sites

- Clark Reservation State Park – a state park south of Syracuse
- Old Erie Canal State Historic Park – a linear state historic park, part of the New York State Canalway Trail, originating near the Town offices in central DeWitt, continuing on to Rome, New York; includes:
  - Cedar Bay Park
    - The Town of DeWitt has hosted Erie Canal Day, an annual celebration with entertainment games, music, and refreshments at Cedar Bay Park since 1968.

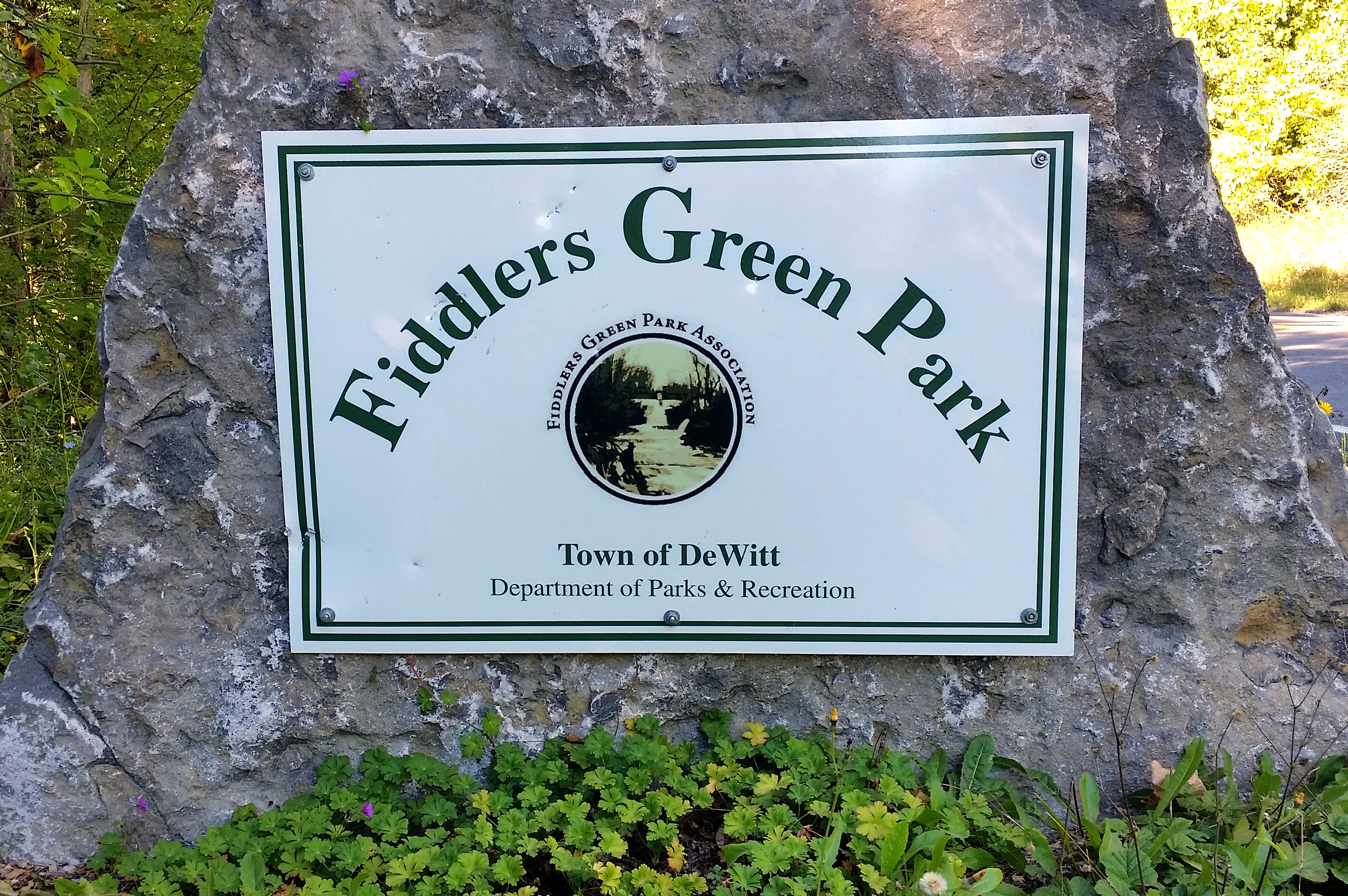
Upper entrance to Fiddlers Green Park, Jamesville, New York

Municipal parks

- Butternut Creek Recreation and Nature Trail – a 67-acre, partially developed area off of Kinne Road, near Wegmans
- Fiddlers Green Park – a small, developing park in the hamlet of Jamesville
- Maxwell Park – a 105-acre park in East Syracuse
- Ryder Park and Recreation Area – a 12-acre park next to DeWitt Town Hall
- Willis Carrier Recreation Center and Park – a 22-acre park next to Carrier Campus

Other

- Community Library of DeWitt and Jamesville – the public library that serves the Town of DeWitt as part of the Onondaga County Public Library System
- Drumlins Country Club – owned by Syracuse University, operates two 18-hole golf courses, one private and one public

== Education ==
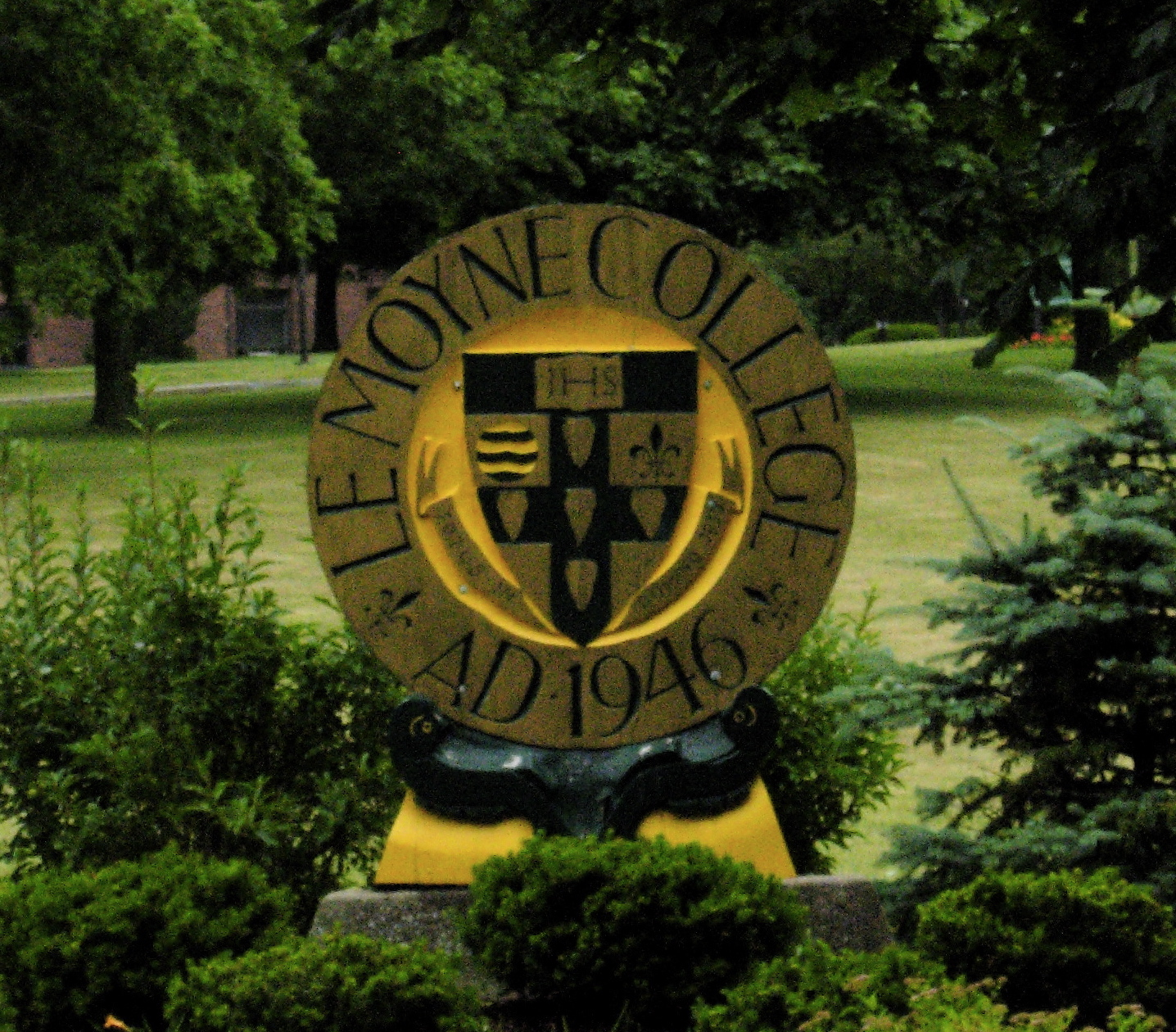
Le Moyne College

School districts

- Jamesville-DeWitt (JD) School District, headquartered in DeWitt, serves portions of the Town
- East Syracuse-Minoa (ESM) School District, headquartered in the Town of Manlius, serves portions of the Town of DeWitt
- North Syracuse Central School District
- Fayetteville-Manlius Central School District

Other

Other schools in the Town of DeWitt include:

- Bishop Grimes Junior/Senior High School
- Christian Brothers Academy (CBA)
- Le Moyne College
- Manlius Pebble Hill School (MPH)
- Syracuse Hebrew Day School (SHDS)

== See also ==
- Cicero, New York
- LaFayette, New York
- Manlius, New York
- Onondaga, New York
- Salina, New York
- Timeline of town creation in Central New York
