= Indian Hill (New York) =

Historical site in New York, U.S.

Coordinates: 42.9700°N 75.9711°W

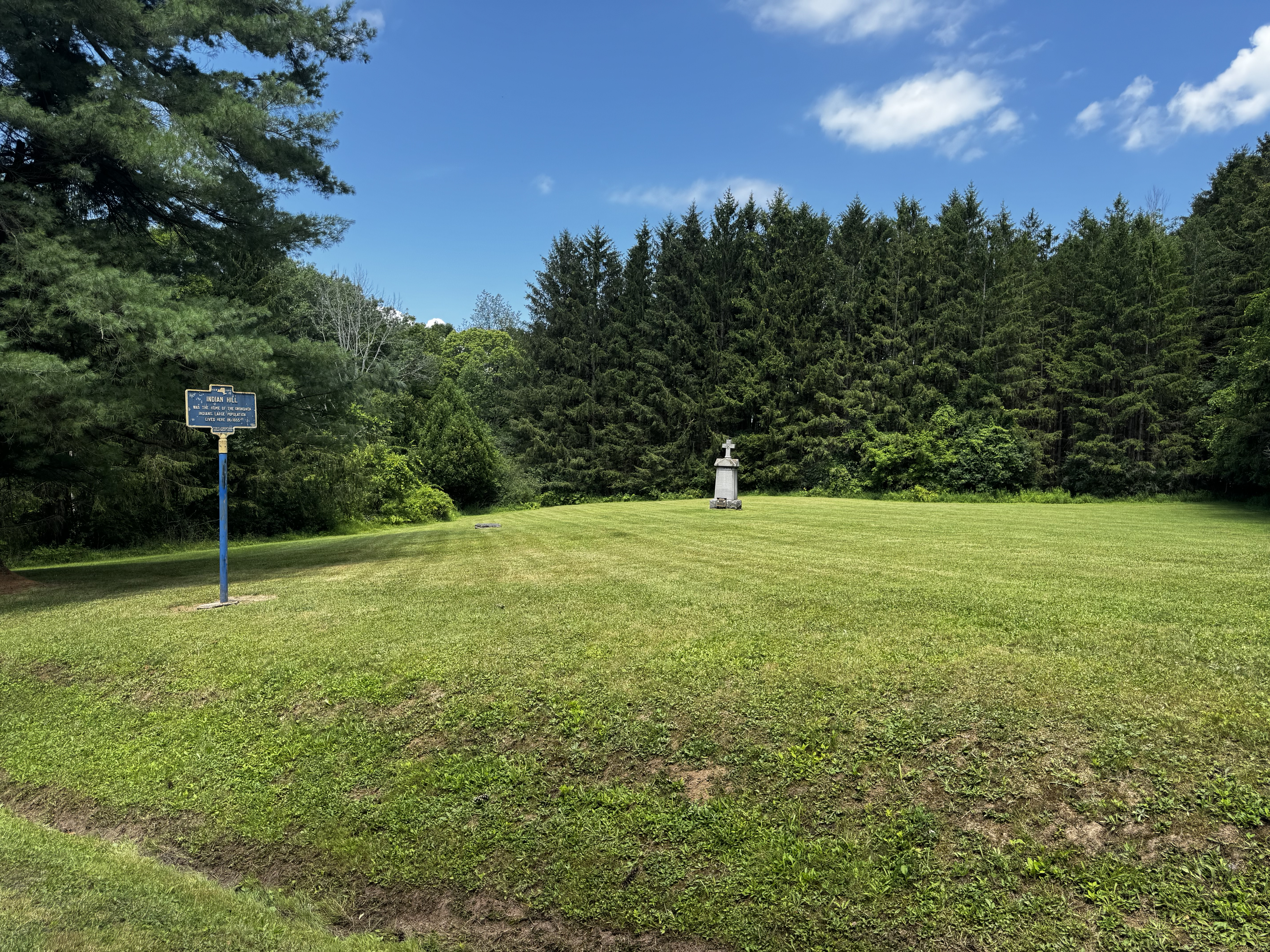
The Indian Hill Memorial Park site with historical marker and monument

Indian Hill is located in south of Manlius, New York, in Onondaga County. Indian Hill was the site of a 17th-century Onondaga village and later a Catholic mission, founded by Father Simon Le Moyne. It is among the first Onondaga settlements ever visited by Europeans.

The largest population of the Onondaga people lived in Indian Hill in 1654. The Indian Hill marker was installed as part of New York's Historic Marker project, which ran from 1926 to 1939. The marker is one of many New York State historic markers in Onondaga County.

== Geography ==
Indian Hill is located on Indian Hill Road West, positioned between Watervale Road and Pompey Center Road, approximately 0.6 miles west of Pompey Center Road. It is found between the two branches of Limestone Creek. Indian Hill is located east of Jamesville Beach Park and west of Cazenovia Lake. The marker is on Indian Hill Road with an address of 8031 Indian Hill Road, Manlius, New York 13104.

Indian Hill is the site of Indian Hill Memorial Park, which can be found by car from Trout Lily Lane via Pompey Center Road.

Indian Hill's close proximity to water was important for the Onondaga civilization because it helped their agriculture and orchards flourish.

== History ==
=== 17th century ===
Seneca historian Arthur C. Parker wrote that the site was a Native American settlement that once had an earthwork and four-to-five-foot-tall walls.

French colonists entered the area in 1654 and wrote about the settlement having palisades and gates. Archaeologists have found European-made artifacts, including kaolin pipes and brass objects, from around 1650 to 1675. Onondaga craftspeople upcycled European brass into points, replacing knapped stone points. Metal artifacts, including knives, awls, lead shot, fishhooks, and scissors were excavated and are now in the collection of Syracuse University. Archaeologists also found glass pony beads and bugle beads. Artifacts from the Indian Hill site are also found in other collections throughout New York.

In 1655, French priests came to Indian Hill and celebrated mass. Despite the presence of the priests, the early Onondaga people did not preserve any of Catholic traditions, except for the use of ashes. It was only after this visit that the Onondaga were recognized as a specific people by Europeans.

Following the mass, the priests built a chapel, establishing the "Mission of St. John the Baptist", which spanned from Indian Hill to a point near Jamesville, covering a distance of several miles. This mission was conducted for 27 years, from 1655 to 1681.

Historical records suggest that one Onondaga village at Indian Hill was occupied from approximately 1663 to 1682, and a nearby village, dubbed the Indian Castle site, was also occupied until 1682.

By 1677, English colonist Wentworth Greenhalgh recorded the settlement not longer had palisaded defenses. Later colonists recorded that one circular wall was 300 to 350 feet across. Greenhalph wrote that the Onondaga town was "very large; consisting of about 140 houses, not fenced; it is situate upon a hill that is very large" with "cleared land, whereon the corner is planted. They have likewise a small village about two miles beyond thatt, consisting of about 24 houses."

In 1696, a French army under Frontenac entered Indian Hill and burned down several Onondaga villages.

=== 19th century ===
The site became the farmstead of Isaac P. Jobs.

=== 20th century ===
In 1905, Father George Mahan funded a celebration at Indian Hill Memorial Park to recognize the 250th anniversary of the Mass at the Roman Catholic Church in Pompey Hill where over 2500 people attended.

In 1917, a Roman Catholic service organization, named the Order of Alhambra erected a marker on current day Indian Hill Memorial Park. The marker was erected during a national convention held in Syracuse, NY.

The marker reads,

Indian Hill / In a bark chapel on this spot / The Holy Sacrifice of the Mass / Was First Offered in New York State / By Rev. Joseph M. Chaumonot / Sunday 14, November 1655 / Going Therefore Teach / Ye all Nations / Baptizing Them in the / Name of the Father / And the Son and the Holy Ghost / Teaching Them to Observe all / Things Whatsoever Have Commanded You / St. Matthew XXVII 19–20 / Erected by the Order / Of the Alhambra / Anno Domini – MCMXVII

The “bark chapel” in which the mass was held, which is mentioned in the inscription, was the home of an Onondaga woman named Teotonhararo, which the marker does not mention.

The New York State Education Department erected a historical marker on the site, stating that Indian Hill "was the home of the Onondaga / Indians. Large population / lived here in 1655."

== Controversies regarding the memorial ==
A controversy associated with Indian Hill Memorial Park is the use of the word “population” to describe the Onondaga in a marker on the site. This is considered to be a loaded word because it limits the history of the Onondaga to Indian Hill, although their history is much more extensive and complicated.

== Current uses of Indian Hill ==
Indian Hill has been used for religious ceremonies in the late 20th century by several catholic churches in the greater Manlius area including the Oran Community Church, Delphi Falls United Church, Pompey Hill United Church, and the Church of the Immaculate Conception.

Indian Hill Memorial Park is home to various wildlife and is a preserved area owned by Save The Country Land Trust. The memorial has been left largely untouched.

Indian Hill Memorial Park is occasionally still used for pilgrimages, interfaith prayer services, and Roman Catholic celebrations.
