= De Witt (CDP), New York =

De Witt, New York
- Census-designated place
- Location within New York Location within the United States
- Coordinates: 43°2′6″N 76°4′4″W
- Country: United States
- State: New York
- County: Onondaga
- Town: DeWitt

Area
  - Total: 6.51 sq mi (16.85 km^{2})
  - Land: 6.49 sq mi (16.80 km^{2})
  - Water: 0.019 sq mi (0.05 km^{2})
- Elevation: 473 ft (144 m)

Population (2020)
  - Total: 11,247
  - Density: 1,734.1/sq mi (669.54/km^{2})
- Time zone: UTC-5 (Eastern (EST))
  - Summer (DST): UTC-4 (EDT)
- ZIP Codes: 13214 (De Witt); 13057 (East Syracuse); 13078 (Jamesville); 13224 (Syracuse)
- Area codes: 315/680
- FIPS code: 36-20467
- GNIS feature ID: 2806956

De Witt is a census-designated place (CDP) in the town of DeWitt, Onondaga County, New York, United States. It was first listed as a CDP prior to the 2020 census.

The CDP is in eastern Onondaga County, in the southern part of the town of DeWitt. It is bordered to the northwest by the city of Syracuse, to the north by the village of East Syracuse, and to the east and south by Interstate 481, which separates it from the rest of the town of DeWitt. East Genesee Street is the main road through the CDP, leading west 4 miles (6 km) to downtown Syracuse and east 3 miles (5 km) to Fayetteville. New York State Route 92 follows East Genesee Street within the De Witt CDP, while State Route 5 follows it in the eastern part of the CDP, before turning north to take Erie Boulevard toward downtown.

== Demographics ==
Historical population
Census	Pop.	Note	%±
2020	11,247		—
U.S. Decennial Census

== Education ==
All of the CDP is in the Jamesville-DeWitt Central School District.

Le Moyne College is in the northwest corner of the CDP.
