= Indian Hill Site =

Indian Hill Site may refer to:

- Indian Hill site (Manlius, New York), a 17th-century Onondaga town
- Indian Hill site (Marquette, Kansas), listed on the National Register of Historic Places in Ellsworth County, Kansas
- Indian Hill site (Royalton, Minnesota), listed on the National Register of Historic Places in Benton County, Minnesota (listing code="DR")
- Indian Hill Site (St. Helena Island, South Carolina), listed on the National Register of Historic Places in Beaufort County, South Carolina
