= Butternut Creek (Limestone Creek tributary) =

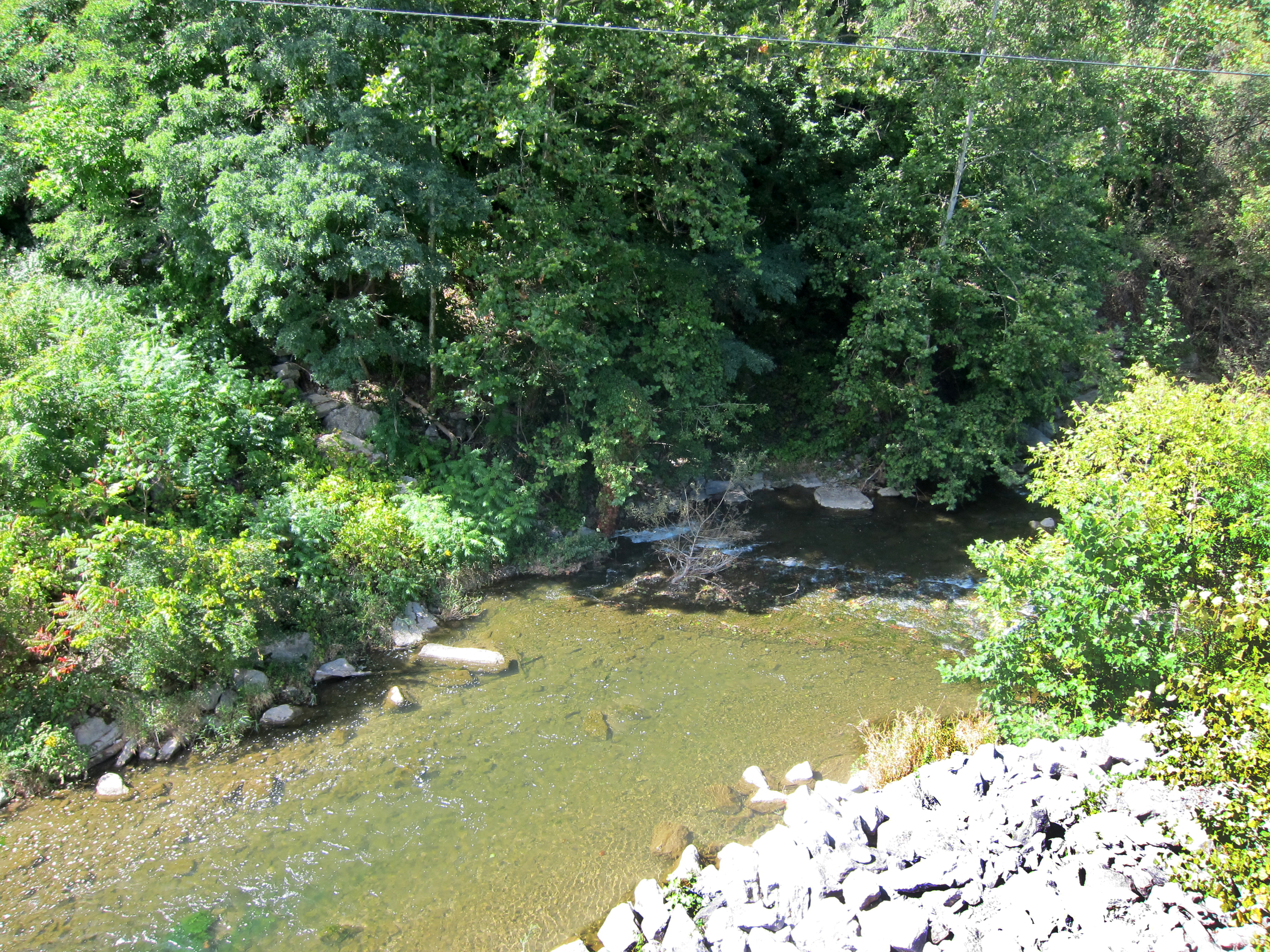
- Butternut Creek at the Jamesville Road bridge

Location
- Country: United States
- State: New York

Physical characteristics
- Source: Unnamed marsh
  - location: Apuila Station
  - coordinates: 42°49′25″N 76°04′22″W
  - elevation: 1,212 ft (369 m)
- Mouth: Limestone Creek
  - location: Minoa
  - coordinates: 43°05′53″N 75°59′59″W
  - elevation: 387 ft (118 m)
- Length: 16 mi (26 km)
- Discharge
  - location: Jamesville
  - average: 49.5 cu ft/s (1.40 m^{3}/s)
  - minimum: 3.85 cu ft/s (0.109 m^{3}/s)
  - maximum: 2,820 cu ft/s (80 m^{3}/s)

Basin features
- Tributaries
  - left: Rush Creek (New York), Meadow Brook (New York)
  - right: Cascades Creek

Butternut Creek is a stream in the greater Syracuse, New York area and a tributary of Limestone Creek, part of the Oneida Lake watershed. The creek is about 16 miles (26 km) long.

== Geography ==
The creek begins in a marshy area at Apulia Station, near State Route 80, as the confluence of a few seasonal streams that drain the nearby Truxton, Jones and Fellows Hills. It flows north through a glacial valley into Jamesville Reservoir. Below Jamesville Reservoir it is joined by Rush Creek, flows through the village of Jamesville, past Clark Reservation State Park, and then under Interstate 481. The creek intersects the old Erie Canal at the Cedar Bay near DeWitt where it is also joined by Meadow Brook. The creek then flows past the CSX DeWitt rail yards and Interstate 90, turns east, and flows into Limestone Creek near Minoa.

The Butternut Creek watershed encompasses approximately 75 square miles (190 km^{2}). There are 77.6 miles (124.9 km) of mapped streams within the watershed. Water quality in the Jamesville reach and above is considered good. However, the lower reaches of the creek are moderately affected by high nutrient levels from agriculture and urban runoff. The 100-year flood flow at Interstate 90 bridge is estimated at 4,306 cubic feet per second (121.9 m^{3}/s).

== Geology ==
The topography of the Butternut Creek watershed was sculpted by glaciers during the last ice age, During the glacial maximum, about 20,000 years ago, the whole area was covered by a thick ice sheet. As the ice retreated about 12,000 years ago during the Pleistocene, Glacial Lake Newbury was formed to the west, in the present-day Syracuse area. The lake was initially dammed on its east end by the hills between the Butternut and Onondaga Creek valleys. As meltwater filled the lake, it overflowed this ridge, turning what is now lower Butternut Creek into a large river, eventually connecting to the Mohawk–Hudson River river system. After the ice fully melted, the water drained northward into the Great Lakes and the Saint Lawrence River, leaving the now dry "Syracuse channels" – a series of large breaks between the Butternut and Onondaga valleys – and a 180 foot escarpment at Clark Reservation State Park, which was once a giant waterfall fed by glacier melt.

Near Jamesville, the Butternut Creek valley has carved through the limestone Onondaga Escarpment, part of the 550-million-year-old Onondaga Formation, creating a steep and narrow gorge. The Jamesville Quarry is situated along the creek and has excavated about 2,238 acres (906 ha) of the area.

== History ==
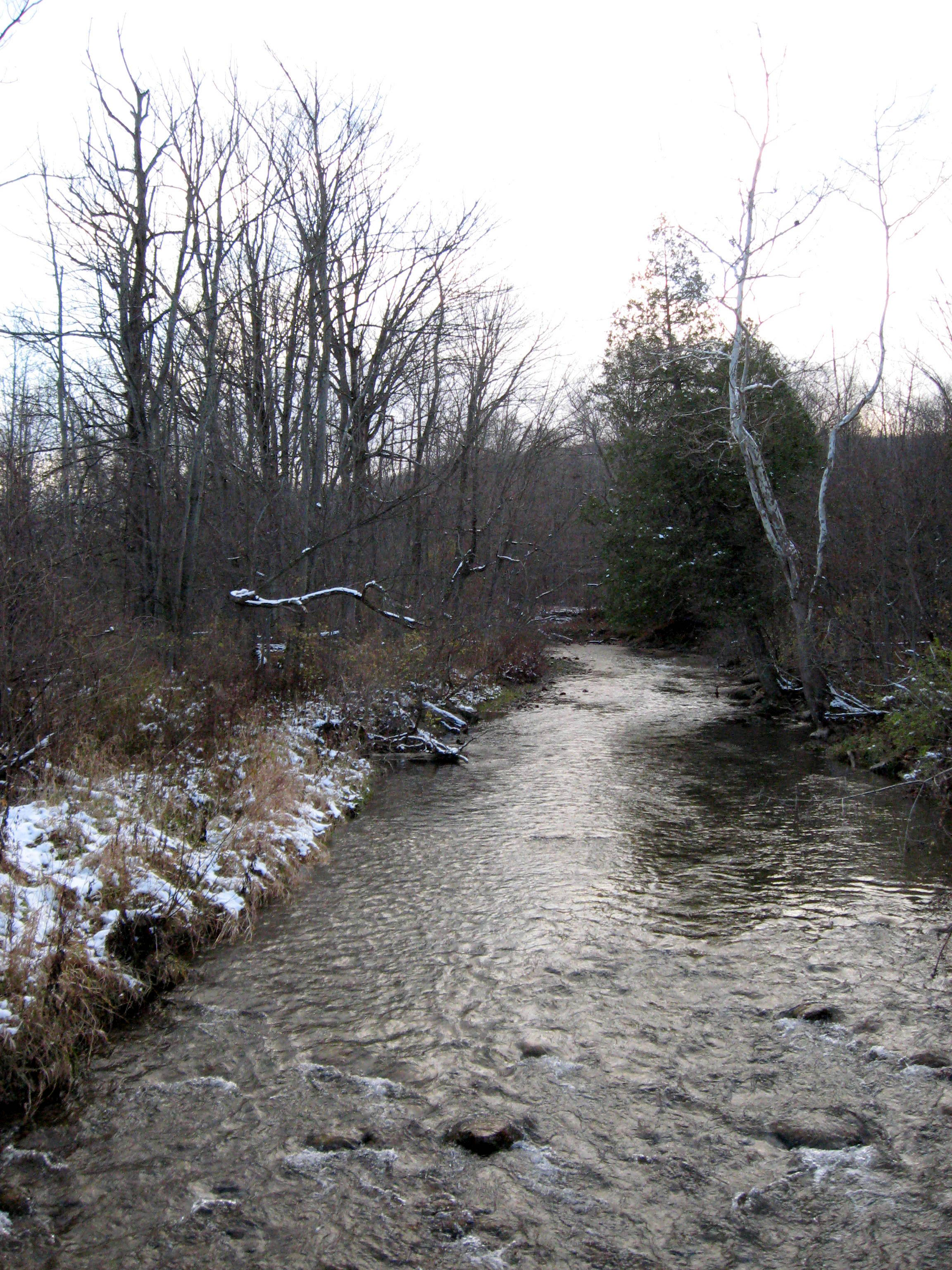
Butternut Creek above Jamesville Reservoir

The Butternut Creek valley was centrally located in the traditional lands of the Onondaga people. In 1681, Father Jean de Lamberville wrote that the main Onondaga village was situated along the east bank of the creek about a mile south of present day Jamesville, in the valley now flooded by Jamesville Reservoir. After clashes with French colonists in the early 1700s the Onondaga moved south into the hill country along upper Butternut Creek, before being forced west to the Onondaga Creek during the 1720s. According to the Geographic Names Information System, known Native American names for the creek include Ka-soongk-ta, Kashunkta, Ki-ech-i-o-i-ah-te, and Oh-jees-twa-ya-na.

In 1856, the first Butternut Creek Aqueduct was built to carry the Erie Canal across the creek. The original wooden structure has since been replaced by a three-span stone and concrete bridge, with a span of 80 feet (24 m).

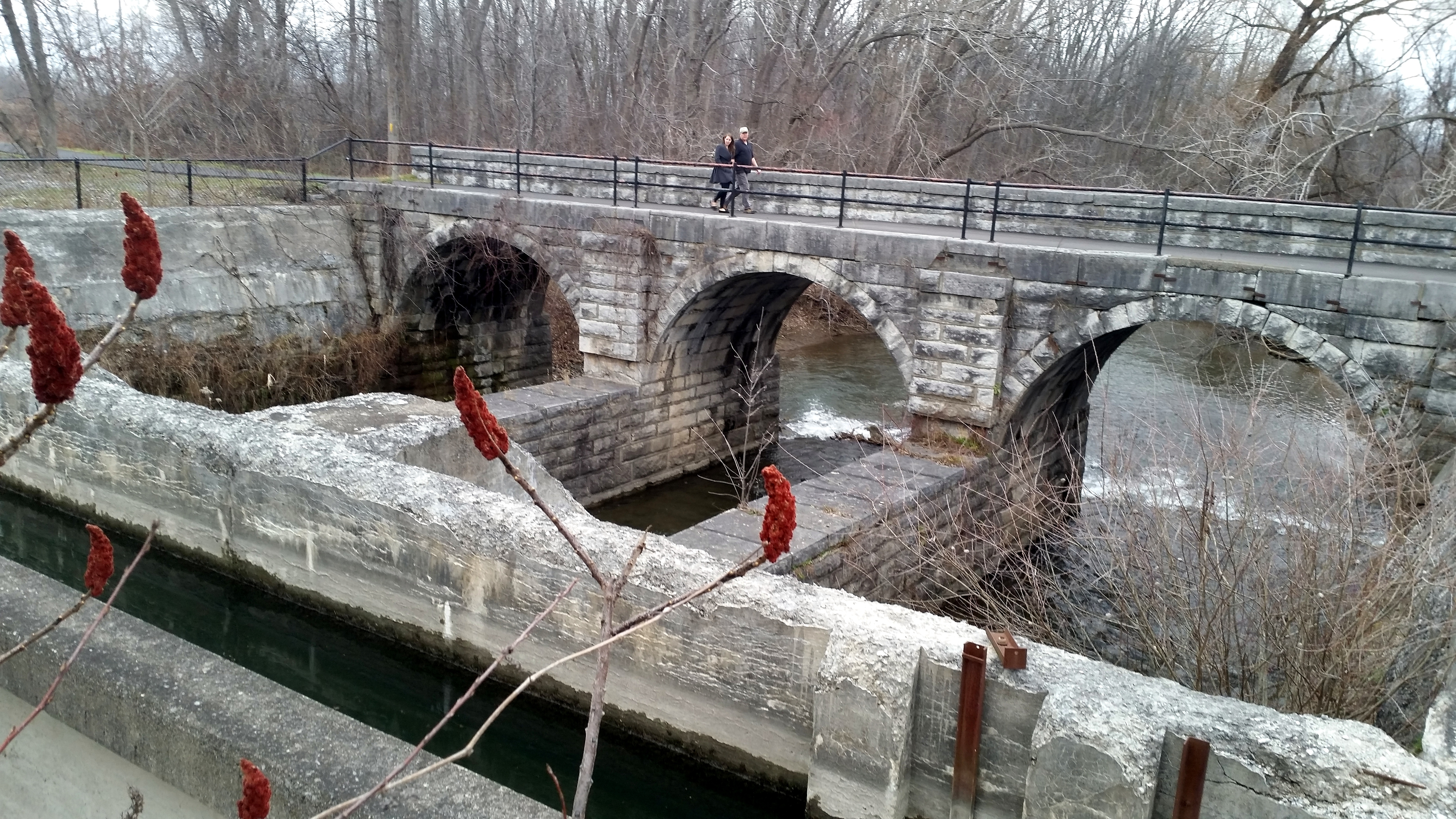
Butternut Creek aqueduct at Old Erie Canal, DeWitt, NY

Jamesville Reservoir was originally constructed in 1874 to provide water for the Erie Canal during dry seasons. The reservoir has 224 acres (91 ha) of water, a capacity of 4,000 acre⋅ft (4,900,000 m^{3}), and is bordered by Jamesville Beach County Park, a popular local swimming area. During the 1970s, the Jamesville Dam was found to have cracked from age and the reservoir was temporarily drained while repairs were carried out.

During the floods of 1974 the creek crested at a record 7.84 ft (2.39 m), causing flooding in portions of DeWitt. Several portions of the creek were channelized during the construction of Interstate 481 in the 1970s, to provide flood control and reduce erosion.

In 2012 the Butternut Creek aqueduct breached, draining a large part of the Erie Canal and causing flash flooding in Butternut Creek. The aqueduct was repaired by plugging the breach with gravel.

== Recreation ==
The creek is stocked annually with 7,600 brown trout and 600 brook trout from the Carpenter's Brook Fish Hatchery. The New York State Department of Environmental Conservation maintains 8.1 miles (13.0 km) of the creek for public fishing. There is also a population of wild brook trout.

The 67.5-acre (27.3 ha) Butternut Creek Recreation Area, a municipal park of the Town of DeWitt, is located adjacent to the creek in the vicinity of I-481 and Kinne Road, and consists of a hiking/ biking trail along the creek as well as boardwalk trails in nearby marshes. The trail connects with the New York State Canalway Trail at Ryder Park and Recreation Area, on the old Erie Canal. There is a proposal to add a canoe launch and fishing dock on Butternut Creek.

== List of crossings ==
From the mouth upstream:

- Schepps Corner Road
- Myers Road
- I-90 / New York State Thruway
- Fremont Road
- Kirkville Road
- Ellis Street
- Conrail (CSX DeWitt yards)
- Manlius Center Road
- Old Erie Canal and Canalway Trail
- Kinne Road
- NY 5 / East Genesee Street
- I-481
- Andrews Road
- Jamesville Road
- I-481
- Jamesville Road
- Syracuse, Binghamton & New York Railway
- NY 173 / East Seneca Turnpike
- Unnamed road
- Jamesville Dam
- Footpath in Jamesville Beach County Park
- Palladino Road
- Walburger Road
- Apulia Road
- Apulia Road
- Colton Road
- Weller Road
- Dodge Road
- US 20 / Cherry Valley Turnpike
- Palmer Road
- Cascade Road
- Clark Hollow Road
- Clark Hollow Road
- Daley Road
- NY 80

== See also ==
- List of rivers of New York
