= Roy Atwell =

American actor (1878–1962)

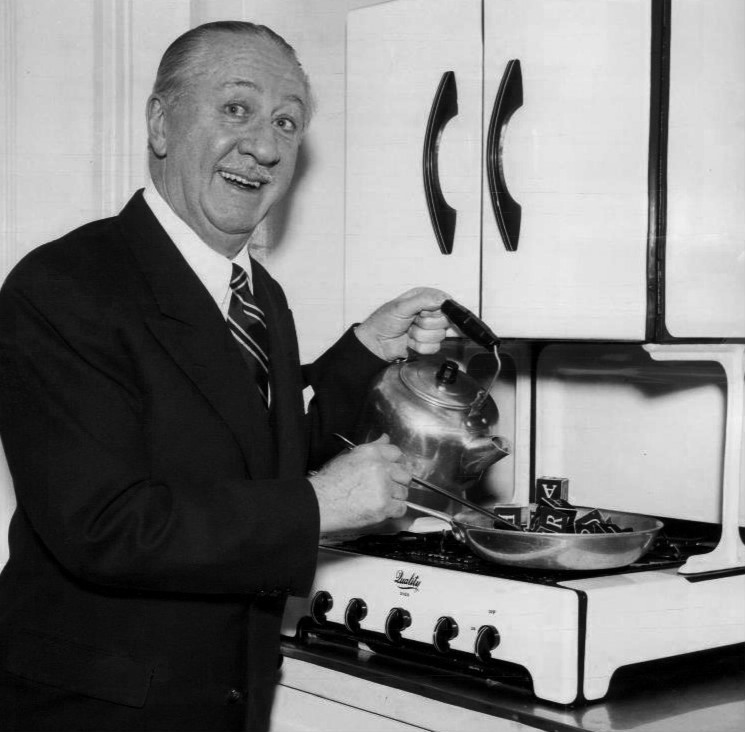
- Atwell in 1940
- Born: John Leroy Atwell; May 2, 1878; Syracuse, New York, U.S.
- Died: February 6, 1962 (aged 83); New York City, U.S.
- Resting place: Evergreen Cemetery, Cazenovia, New York, U.S.
- Occupations: Actor, comedian
- Years active: 1914–1947
- Spouses: Blanche Wear (m. 1907, divorced) Dorothy Young (m. 1913; div. 1916) Ethel Smith (m. 1916; div. 1936)
- Children: 1

John Leroy Atwell (May 2, 1878 – February 6, 1962) was an American actor and comedian. He was known for playing characters that misdeliver their lines or stammer, most notably Doc from Walt Disney's Snow White and the Seven Dwarfs.

== Early life ==
Atwell, son of Joseph Addison Atwell, was born on May 2, 1878, in Syracuse, New York. He was educated at the Sargent School of Acting.

Atwell was a direct descendant of Joseph Atwell (1754–1834), a Revolutionary War soldier who in 1792 purchased land in the military tract in New York and built a house ("Atwell's Corners") in what is today Pompey Hollow, south of Syracuse, near Cazenovia.

== Career ==
Atwell appeared in 34 films between 1914 and 1947, primarily playing cameos or portraying characters that comedically messed up their dialogue, and was famous for voicing Doc the Dwarf in Disney's feature film, Snow White and the Seven Dwarfs.

As well as his film work, he appeared in several Broadway productions, including The Little Missus, The Mimic World, Oh, My Dear!, The Firefly, Apple Blossoms, and How's Your Health? He was a member of the Fortune Gallo's San Carlo Opera Company.

When Atwell began working on Broadway, he had a role, as a serious actor, in which he was to deliver the following line: "It is spring and all the little birds are twittering in the tree tops." Being new and somewhat on edge, what Atwell actually did say was: "Tis ting and the twits are birdering in the tree flops." Atwell fully expected to be dismissed, but the misdelivered line drew a big laugh from the audience and, after the show was over, he was congratulated and asked to repeat it the next night. His unwitting comedic success caused Atwell to make the change from being a dramatic actor to becoming a comedian.

Atwell joined ASCAP in 1957. He composed the popular song "Some Little Bug is Going to Find You" and wrote the words to a song called "When a Piece of Toast Climbs Your Bedpost with a Cigar."

== Personal life ==
Atwell was married three times: to Blanche West (1907–?), Dorothy Young (1913–1916), and Ethel Smith (1916–1936).

== Filmography ==
- 1922: Don't Get Personal as Horace Kane
- 1922: Red Hot Romance as Jim Conwell
- 1922: Grand Larceny as Harkness Boyd
- 1922: The Heart Specialist as Winston Gates
- 1922: South of Suva as Marmaduke Grubb
- 1923: Souls for Sale as Arthur Tirrey
- 1926: The Outsider as Jerry Sidon
- 1933: Crashing the Gate (Short)
- 1933: The Little Broadcast as Announcer
- 1936: The Harvester as Jake Eben
- 1937: Varsity Show as Prof. Washburn
- 1937: Behind the Mike as Vale
- 1937: Snow White and the Seven Dwarfs as Doc (voice, uncredited)
- 1939: Honolulu as Bearded Man on Ship (uncredited)
- 1939: Bridal Suite as Professor Kockerthaler (uncredited)
- 1942: The Fleet's In as Arthur Sidney
- 1946: People Are Funny as Mr. Pippensiegal
- 1946: Gentleman Joe Palooka as Senator Sam H. Smiley
- 1946: Abie's Irish Rose as Dick Saunders
- 1947: Where There's Life as Salesman (final film role)
