= List of New York State Historic Markers in Onondaga County, New York =

This is a list of New York State Historic Markers in Onondaga County, New York.

== Listings county-wide ==
Marker name	Image	Location	City/Town	Coords	Marker text
SITE OF		On NYS 5, two miles west of Syracuse at Fairmount Corners	Camillus, Town Of, New York		Home Of James Geddes, 1798 Erie Canal Surveyor, 1808 Chief Engineer 1816–1825
EARLY SCHOOL		On county road, about 1/2 mile south of Brewerton	Cicero, Town Of, New York		Here Stood Schoolhouse; District No. 1, Built 1824. First District School In Town Of Cicero
JOHN LEACH		On US 11 at Cicero	Cicero, Town Of, New York		Made First Settlement At Cicero Corners In 1802. Kept A Tavern In Loghouse
LANDING PLACE		On US 11 at Brewerton	Cicero, Town Of, New York		Near This Point Van Schaick Expedition Against Onondagas Landed April 20, 1779
SITE OF INDIAN VILLAGE		On US 11 at Brewerton	Cicero, Town Of, New York		Techiroguen Visited By Le Moyne 1654 And By La Salle 1673
TOLL-GATE HOUSE		On Bennett St. at Brewerton	Cicero, Town Of, New York		Built At South End Of First Highway Bridge, 1824 At Brewerton. Moved To This Site About 1850.
CAUGHDENOY		On county road at Caughdenoy	Clay, Town Of, New York		Lock Constructed By State Of New York 1841.
OAK ORCHARD		On county road 1½ miles north of Euclid	Clay, Town Of, New York		Lock Constructed By State Of New York 1840.
ONONDAGA NATION		On NYS 57 about one mile south of Three Rivers	Clay, Town Of, New York		Of Indians Settled Hereabouts According To Tradition Several Centuries Before Discovery Of America By Columbus, 1492.
SITE OF		On South Bank Of Barge Canal At Three Rivers	Clay, Town Of, New York		Mc Gee's Inn (According To Traditions) Patrick Mc Gee, First Settler Town Of Clay, 1793. In 1791 Kept First Inn At Brewerton.
DANFORTH MILLS		On County Rd. About 1/2 Mile North Of Jamesville	Dewitt, Town Of, New York		On This Side Of The Creek Saw Mill Built 1792 Grist Mill
JOHN YOUNG		On NYS 5 And NYS 92 At Dewitt	Dewitt, Town Of, New York		1752–1834 Revolutionary Soldier First Settler Here In 1791 Village First Called Youngsville
MOREHOUSE FLATS		On NYS 5 And NYS 92 At Dewitt	Dewitt, Town Of, New York		Benj. Morehouse Settled Here 1789 His Log Tavern Opened 1790 Mexico Town Organized Here 1791 Meeting Here Proposed Formation Of Onondagaco. Dec 23, 1793
UNION		On NYS 20 N & NYS 173 About 1/2 Mile East Of Jamesville	Dewitt, Town Of, New York		Congregational Church Building Erected 1808 Society Moved To Jamesville 1828
BUILT ABOUT 1820		On NYS 5 At Elbridge	Elbridge, Town Of, New York		Home Of Col. John Stevens, Onondaga County Militia, War Of 1812
THIS LOT		On NYS 5 At Elbridge	Elbridge, Town Of, New York	43°01′58.9434″N 76°27′28.04″W	Was Part Of Military Tract Of Capt. Wm. Stevens, Member Mass. Society Cincinnati: State Superintendent Of Salt Industry.
ANDREWS CABIN		On County Rd. About 2½ Mi. South Of Fabius	Fabius, Town Of, New York		Built By William Andrews About 1821
BAPTIST CHURCH		On NYS 80 At Fabius	Fabius, Town Of, New York		First In Town Of Fabius Unbroken Service Since Its Organization On Aug. 24, 1803. This Building Erected 1818.
FIRST CHURCH		On County Rd. About 3 Mi. South Of Fabius	Fabius, Town Of, New York		In The Valley Organized Here 1803 First Baptist Church Of Fabius
SITE OF		On County Rd. About 2½ Mi. South Of Fabius	Fabius, Town Of, New York		Keeney Cabin Inhabited 1795 By Simon Keeney, Jr. Birthplace Of Son John First White Child Born In This Valley 1797
SITE OF		On NYS 80 At Fabius	Fabius, Town Of, New York		Woodruf Cabin Pioneer Home Of Gurdon Woodruf Built About 1795
WEBSTER CABIN		On County Rd. About 3 Mi. South Of Fabius	Fabius, Town Of, New York		Built About 1820 By Eli Webster First Frame House In This Valley
CARDIFF GIANT		On Us 20 At Cardiff	Lafayette, Town Of, New York		Disinterred Near This Village On Oct. 16, 1869. Represented As A Petrified Prehistoric Man, It Was Subsequently, Proved A Hoax
MASON CREEK		On Apulia Road at intersection of Colton Road.	Lafayette, Town Of, New York	42.90885°N 76.07446°W)	
NEAR HERE WAS THE HOME OF		On NYS 91 At Jamesville	Lafayette, Town Of, New York		Moses Dewitt Pioneer Settler, Surveyor Major Of Militia And Judge Of The County Court
[ARROW] 600 FEET		On NYS 91 About 1½ Miles South Of Jamesville	Lafayette, Town Of, New York		Site Of Indian Town Onondaga 1684–1696 Destroyed At Time Of Frontenac's Invasion 1696
BATTERY B		On NYS 370 About 3 Miles Southwest Of Baldwinsville	Lysander, Town Of, New York		First N.y. Light Artillery Drilled Near This Point Under Their Organizer, Capt. Rufus D. Pettit, In The Summer Of 1861.
FIRST LIFT LOCK		On NYS 31 & NYS 370 At Baldwinsville	Lysander, Town Of, New York		The First Lift Lock To Be Constructed West Of Little Falls Was Built Here In 1809 By Jonas C. Baldwin.
FIRST SETTLER		On County Rd. At Jacksonville	Lysander, Town Of, New York		The Home Of The First White Settler In The Township Of Lysander, Jonathan Palmer, Revolutionary Soldier, Was Built On This Site, 1793.
GRACE CHURCH		On Elizabeth St. At Baldwinsville	Lysander, Town Of, New York		The Episcopal Church Was The First Church In The United States, According To Tradition, To Be Lighted By Electricity
ON THIS HILL		On NYS 31 At Baldwinsville	Lysander, Town Of, New York		In The Original House, 31 Women Organized The Female Charitable Society, Second Oldest Woman's Society In The U.s., July 27, 1817.
SITE OF		On NYS 48 About 4 Miles North Of Baldwinsville	Lysander, Town Of, New York		Halfway Tavern 1814-34 Stopping Place For Stage And For Oudiaga, Indian Runner, First Mail Carrier Between Syracuse And Oswego
CHERRY VALLEY TURNPIKE		On Academy Street At Manlius	Manlius, Town Of, New York	43°00′09″N 75°58′37″W	Terminated Here Completed About 1809, Joining The Seneca Turnpike Here
CHRIST CHURCH		On NYS 173 At Manlius	Manlius, Town Of, New York	43°00′08″N 75°58′27″W	Oldest Church Edifice And Oldest Episcopal Parish In Onondaga County, Inc. 1804, 1811; Built 1813; Removed To This Side, 1832.
DEEP SPRING		On NYS 173 At The Madison & Onondaga County Line	Manlius, Town Of, New York	43°01′37.85″N 75°54′47.09″W	Te-ungh-sat-ayagh 450 Ft. North On Iroquois Trail. First Road Made 1790 By Gen. James Wadsworth. County Line And Survey Mark.
FAYETTEVILLE		On NYS 5 & NYS 92 At Fayetteville	Manlius, Town Of, New York		First Called "Manlius Four Corners". Settled In 1791 By Origen Eaton And Joshus Knowlton. Boyhood Home Of Grover Cleveland
GEN. JOHN J. PECK		On NYS 173 At Manlius	Manlius, Town Of, New York	43°00′07″N 75°58′30″W	Born Here Jan. 4, 1821; Won Promotion For Gallantry Mexican War; Made Maj. Gen. 1862; Defended Suffolk, Va.; Died Syracuse, April 21, 1878.
GROVER CLEVELAND		On NYS 5 & NYS 92 At Fayetteville	Manlius, Town Of, New York	43°01′46″N 76°00′26″W	President Of United States 1884–1888 And 1892–1896. His Boyhood Home Is The First House On The Left North Of The Corner House
THE FIRST		On NYS 92 At Manlius	Manlius, Town Of, New York	43°00′05″N 75°58′47″W	Schoolhouse In The Town Of Manlius Was Built Of Logs And Stood Near Here In 1798
THE MANLIUS SCHOOL		On NYS 92 & NYS 20 N At Manlius	Manlius, Town Of, New York		Founded 1869
THE MANLIUS SCHOOL		On NYS 92 About 1/2 Mi. South Of Manlius	Manlius, Town Of, New York		Founded 1869 As St. John's School Oldest Boy's Private Preparatory School In Central New York
THIS WELL		On Rown Rd. About 1 Mile East Of Manlius	Manlius, Town Of, New York		Dug In 1795 By Joseph Williams Soldier Of The Revolution Whose Log House Stood About 50 Feet North
FIRST SAWMILL		On NYS 20 N & NYS 175 At Marcellus	Marcellus, Town Of, New York		In Town Of Marcellus Built 1796 By Deacon Samuel Rice And Judge Dan Bradley
SITE OF		On NYS 20 N & NYS 175 At Marcellus	Marcellus, Town Of, New York		First Frame House In Town Of Marcellus. Built By Dr. Elnathan Beach, Who Served In American Revolution: Sheriff Of County From 1799 To 1801
SITE OF		On NYS 175 At Marcellus	Marcellus, Town Of, New York		Tavern Kept By Deacon Samuel Rice 1800 First Church Services Were Held Here, Also Town Meetings
SITE OF		On NYS 20 N & NYS 175 At Marcellus	Marcellus, Town Of, New York		First Church Edifice In Onondaga County, Completed 1803; Present Church Built 1851 In Central New York
FRANCIS ASBURY		On NYS 20 N & NYS 175 At Onondaga Hill	Onondaga, Town Of, New York		First Bishop Of The Methodist Episcopal Church Preached June 26, 1807, In Onondaga Court House Then Standing On This Site
MORAVIANS		On NYS 11 A About 1 Mi. South Of Syracuse	Onondaga, Town Of, New York		Bishop Spangenberg And David Zeisberger As Missionaries Came To Onondaga Indians Near Here In 1745. David Returned '50,'52, '53, '54, '66.
ONONDAGA RESERVATION		On NYS 11 A About 1 Mi. South Of Syracuse	Onondaga, Town Of, New York		Established 1788. The Onondaga Indian Nation Founded The Iroquois League.
SENTINEL HEIGHTS		On Bull Hill Rd. About 4 Mis. Southeast Of Syracuse	Onondaga, Town Of, New York		Pioneer Cemetery Andrew Share, 1763–1847, Rev. Soldier, Who Gave Land For Cemetery, School House, And Methodist Church, Buried Here
WAR OF 1812		On NYS 20 N & NYS 173 About 1/2 Mi. East Of Onondaga Hill	Onondaga, Town Of, New York	43°0′19.44″N 76°10′4.58″W	Captain Henry Crouch And Captain Benjamin Branch Soldiers Of War Of 1812 Who Died While Encamped Near Here Are Buried Above.
ATWELL'S CORNERS		On Co. Rd. At Madison & Onon. Co. Line 4 Mi. South Of Oran	Pompey, Town Of, New York	42°55′30″N 75°54′22″W)	Joseph Atwell, 1754–1834 Revolutionary Soldier Settled Here 1792. Overseer Of Pompey Highways 1794 Owned Lot In Military Tract
BAPTIST CHURCH		On Co. Rd. At Pompey	Pompey, Town Of, New York	42°54′02″N 76°00′47″W	Built 1820 By N. Sterling. Frederick Freeman First Pastor. Abandoned In 1834. Roman Catholic Church 1866-92. Now Lemoyne Hall.
BIRTHPLACE OF		At Intersection Of Us 20 And NYS 91 At Pompey	Pompey, Town Of, New York	42°53′56″N 76°00′57″W) -->	Gov. Horatio Seymour, 1811 Twice Governor Of New York State. Democratic Candidate For President Against Grant
BIRTHPLACE OF		On Us 20 About 3 Miles Northeast Of Pompey	Pompey, Town Of, New York	42°55′17″N 75°58′13″W)	Charles Mason Born Here In Log House 1804 Graduate West Point 1829 Chief Justice Iowa 1838-42 U.s. Comm'r Patents 1853-57.
CAPE COD COTTAGE		On Co. Rd. About 1 Mi. S.e. Of Oran	Pompey, Town Of, New York		Built 1794 Slave Running Station For Sheltering Slaves During Civil War.
CONGREGATIONAL CHURCH		On County Rd. At Pompey	Pompey, Town Of, New York	42°53′58″N 76°00′56″W	Organized Oct. 19, 1796 By Rev. Ameni R. Robinson Church Built In 1817-18. Now Pompey Presbyterian.
DROVERS TAVERN, 1820		On NYS 92 & NYS 20 N About 1 Mile Southeast Of Oran	Pompey, Town Of, New York	42°58′06.72″N 75°54′56.16″W	Built Of Materials Taken From Premises; Design Of Main House On File Library Of Congress; Last Remaining Tavern For Drovers.
FIRST MASS		At Indian Hill On Town Rd. About 2 Mis. Southwest Of Oran	Pompey, Town Of, New York		In New York State Was Offered About 300 Feet North Of This Marker By Rev. J.m. Chaumont, 1655, In A Bark Chapel
FIRST SCHOOL		On NYS 91 At Pompey	Pompey, Town Of, New York	42°54′00″N 76°00′58″W	Erected In Town Of Pompey 1797 And Used Until 1810 Hepsabah Beebee—teacher Cemetery Adjoined School Grounds, Later Removed
FIRST STEAMBOAT		On NYS 92 & NYS 20 N About 1/2 Mile Northwest Of Oran	Pompey, Town Of, New York	42°59′01.98″N 75°56′38.82″W	Built By Wm. Avery 1 Mile South Of Oran. Launched In Limestone Creek Near Buellville, 1823, Later First Steamboat Used On Erie Canal
FIRST TAVERN		On NYS 92 & NYS 20 N At Oran	Pompey, Town Of, New York	42°58′43.08″N 75°56′01.86″W	1796–1808 Built And Kept By Job Bartholomew. Burned 1808. Another Built On Same Site In 1809 Kept By Wm. Scoville
HANDY'S TAVERN		On NYS 91 At Pompey	Pompey, Town Of, New York		1797 First Frame Building Erected By E. Butler, Jr. And Run As A Tavern By Him. The Original Frame Is Still In The House.
INDIAN HILL		At Indian Hill On Town Rd. About 2 Miles Southwest Of Oran	Pompey, Town Of, New York	42°58′11.22″N 75°58′14.94″W	Was The Home Of The Onondaga Indians. Large Population Lived Here In 1655.
INDIAN WAR STONE		On County Rd. At Pompey	Pompey, Town Of, New York	42°54′01″N 76°00′47″W	Grindstone Of The Onondaga Indians. Used To Sharpen Arrows And Spears At Indian Hill Until 1666. Moved To Lemoyne Park Pompey, 1905.
LOG HOUSE		On Us 20 At Pompey	Pompey, Town Of, New York	42°53′56″N 76°00′50″W	Erected 1791 By Ebenezer Butler, Jr. First White Settler On Pompey Hill. A Rev. War Soldier, Member Of Assembly
OLDEST FRAME HOUSE		On Us 20 At Pompey	Pompey, Town Of, New York	42°53′51″N 76°01′01″W	In Town Of Pompey Built By Ebenezer Handy, 1806
ORAN		On NYS 92 & NYS 20 N At Oran	Pompey, Town Of, New York	42°58′41.94″N 75°56′00.06″W	Settled In 1793 By The Barnes Brothers, Asa Rosewll, And Phineas. Came Here With Their Families From Massachusetts.
PRATT'S FALLS		On County Rd. At Pratt's Falls Park	Pompey, Town Of, New York		First Mills In Onon. Co. Built By Manoah Pratt, Sr. Abnd Abraham Smith In 1796 First A Saw Mill And Then A Flour Mill In 1798.
ROMAN CATHOLIC MISSION CHURCH		On Town Rd. At Pompey	Pompey, Town Of, New York	42°54′01″N 76°00′46″W	First In Pompey Was Located Here, 1857–1866. Father James Cahill, First Priest
SITE OF		On Us 20 At Pompey Center	Pompey, Town Of, New York		Green's House Built Of Logs In 1796 By David Green. The Settlement Was Known For Years As Green's Corners
SITE OF		On NYS 91 About 1¼ Miles North Pompey	Pompey, Town Of, New York		Log City Rival Of Pompey With A Store, Asery, Tannery, Shoe And Carpenter Shops, And A Schoolhouse.
SITE OF FIRST SCHOOL		On Co. Rd. At Oran	Pompey, Town Of, New York	42°58′37.08″N 75°56′02.76″W	Built Here About 1800. George Clark, First Teacher And Afterwards The First Merchant In Oran
SITE OF		On Town Rd. At Pompey	Pompey, Town Of, New York		Pompey Academy 1810–1834 Original Academy Was 40 × 50 Feet Frame Buildings, Two Stories, Gable End Facing South.
SALT MAKING		On NYS 57 & NYS 370 At Liverpool	Salina, Town Of, New York		Manufacture Of Salt Was Begun Here In Liverpool By John Danforth, Brother As Asa Danforth, 1794
GEDDES		At The Intersection Of NYS 48 And Hiawatha Blvd. At Syracuse	Syracuse, City Of, New York		Town Named For James Geddes 1763–1838, Engineer Of State Canals For N.y. Was First To Make Salt Here. Surveyed Site Of Syracuse, 1804
ONONDAGA BRICK		At The Intersection Of NYS 48 And Hiawatha Blvd. At Syracuse	Van Buren, Town Of, New York		Thomas Marvin, Soldier In Wars Of 1776 And 1812, Settled Here 1811 (Cazenovia 1800). Made First Brick Here From Native Clay Trod By Oxen.
Buellville		Rte 92	Manlius, Town of	42°59′4″N 75°56′43″W	Hamlet named for Buell Family who arrived in 1799. Ran lumber/plaster mills. Luther Buell, "Pompey Pioneer." 1786–1876
Disciples Church		Academy Street	Pompey, Town Of, New York	42°54′02″N 76°00′54″W	Disciples of christ church organized in 1834 with 28 members present building by Matthias Berry in 1868.
Site of Pompey Academy		Academy Street	Pompey, Town Of, New York	42°54′02″N 76°00′43″W	1810-1834 Original academy was 40 X 50 feet frame building, two stories, gable end facing south.
THE ERIE CANAL - CANVASS WHITE		Manlius Center at Old Erie Canal State Historic Park	Manlius, Town Of, New York		Development of hydraulic cement, used in construction of the Erie Canal, by Canvass White
MATILDA JOSLYN GAGE		On Rte 5, Corner of Walnut Street, Fayetteville, NY	Manlius, Town Of, New York	43°01′45″N 76°00′29″W	Nationally Known Abolition and Women's Rights Advocate Lived Here From 1854 Until Her Death In 1898

== See also ==
- List of New York State Historic Markers
- National Register of Historic Places listings in New York
- List of National Historic Landmarks in New York
