= Dr. John Ives House =

Historic house in New York, United States

- U.S. National Register of Historic Places
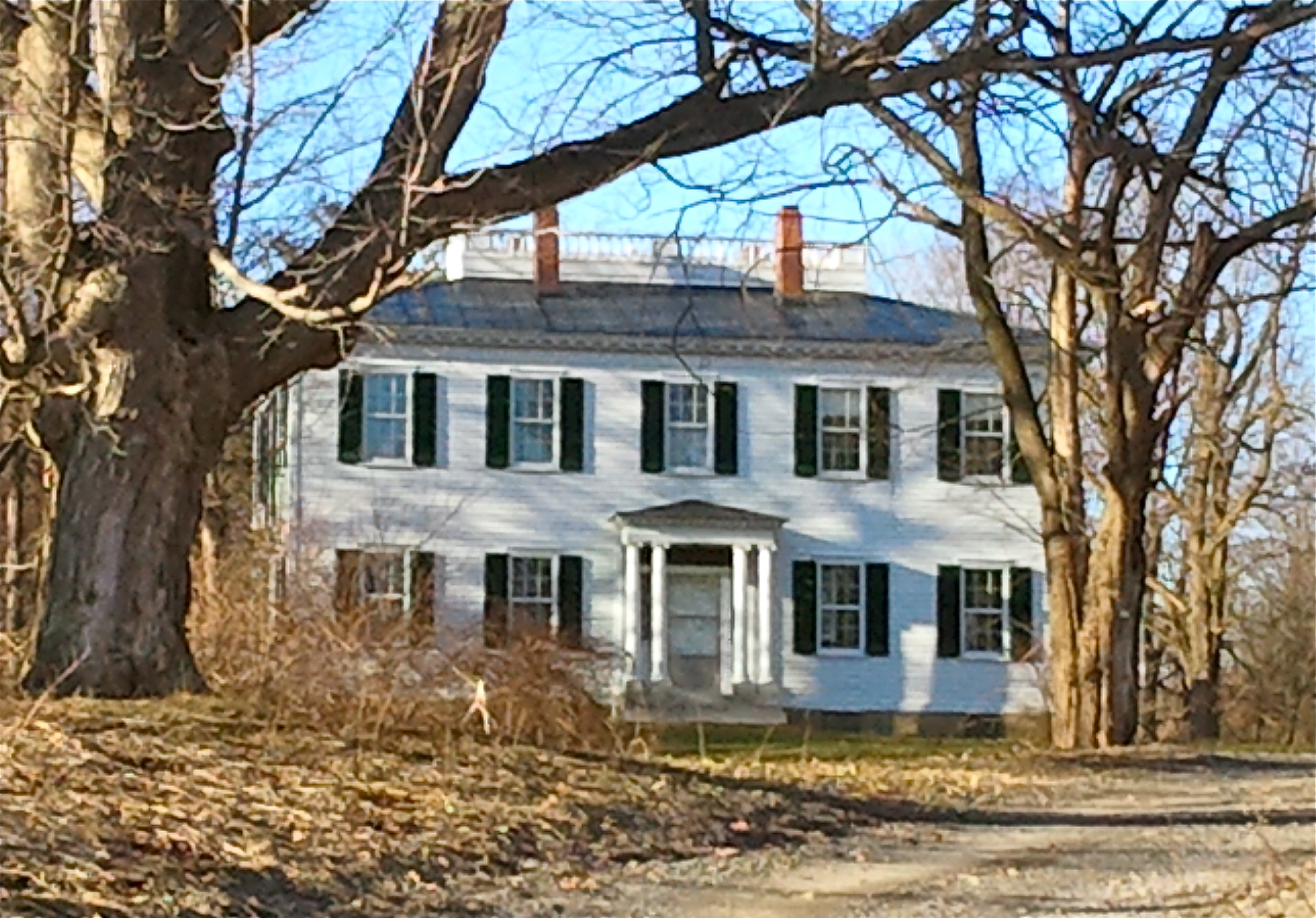

- Location within New York Location within the United States
- Location: 6575 E. Seneca Turnpike, Jamesville, New York
- Coordinates: 42°59′27″N 76°4′4″W
- Area: 6 acres (2.4 ha)
- Built: 1813
- Architectural style: Federal
- NRHP reference No.: 85001938
- Added to NRHP: August 29, 1985

The Dr. John Ives House is a Federal style house in the town of DeWitt, New York, on a hill overlooking the hamlet of Jamesville. It has a widow's walk on top. The original property included 630 acres (250 ha). Over the years the property was sold and divided amongst family members.

It includes 3 contributing buildings—the house, a barn, and a smokehouse—over a 6 acres (2.4 ha) area.

It was the home of John Ives, a Jamesville dentist.
