= Jamesville-DeWitt Central School District =

School district in New York, United States

Jamesville-DeWitt Central School District is a public school district that serves Jamesville, New York, and the town of DeWitt, New York. The school district consists of 2786 students in 5 schools (three K-4 elementary schools, one 5-8 middle school, and one 9-12 high school). As of 2025, the superintendent is Darcy Woodcock (Jan 2019). The Jamesville-DeWitt Central School District offices are located in DeWitt, New York.

The district was founded in 1950 by combining other school districts.

Jamesville-DeWitt student test scores are listed in a New York Times article reporting New York State test scores by county.

== Schools ==
=== Elementary (K-4) ===
- Jamesville Elementary School - Mrs. Marcy Baker, Principal.
- Moses DeWitt Elementary School - Ms. Victoria Lee, Principal.
- Tecumseh Elementary School - Mrs. Ashley Carducci, Principal.

=== Middle (5-8) ===
- Jamesville-DeWitt Middle School - Mr. Andrew “Andy” Eldridge, Principal.

=== High (9-12) ===
- Jamesville-DeWitt High School - Mr. Greg Lawson, Principal.
