= Butternut Creek =

Butternut Creek can mean any of the following:

- Butternut Creek (Limestone Creek tributary), stream in the greater Syracuse, New York area
- Butternut Creek (Unadilla River tributary), downstream of Mount Upton, New York
