= Jamesville Reservoir =

Lake in New York, United States

- Location within New York
- Location: Onondaga County, New York, United States
- Coordinates: 42°58′30″N 76°04′10″W
- Primary inflows: Butternut Creek
- Primary outflows: Butternut Creek
- Basin countries: United States
- Surface area: 198 acres (0.80 km^{2})
- Average depth: 10 feet (3.0 m)
- Max. depth: 36 ft (11 m)
- Shore length^{1}: 3.2 miles (5.1 km)
- Surface elevation: 640 ft (200 m)
- Islands: 1
- Settlements: Jamesville, New York
- ^{1} Shore length is not a well-defined measure.

Jamesville Reservoir is a lake located by Jamesville, New York. The reservoir was created to provide water for the Erie Canal in the 1870s. Since at least the 1940s, it has been a popular recreational site. Onondaga County operates Jamesville Beach Park on the reservoir.

== History ==
The creation of Jamesville Reservoir on Butternut Creek was approved by the Erie Canal Commission in 1872, and a dam completed by 1874. The Canal Commission intended the reservoir to supply the Erie Canal with water during dry months, estimating that it would be able to provide 2,000 cubic feet (57 m^{3}) per minute for sixty days through a feeder canal near Orville. The final cost was $130,000, greater than the initial estimate, which was $100,000.

In the early 20th-century, a company harvested ice from the Reservoir in the winter. By the 1940s, Jamesville Reservoir was a popular site for swimming, and Onondaga County began considering the development of a public beach. The Jamesville Beach Park officially opened on July 2, 1949, though initial work continued on the park for at least a year afterwards. The park was expanded in the 1960s, and again in 1996.

== Fishing ==
Fish species present in the lake include bluegill, largemouth bass, yellow perch, black bullhead, tiger muskie, rock bass, smallmouth bass, pickerel, walleye, and pumpkinseed sunfish. There is carry down access located at the Jamesville Beach Park with the purchase of a day use fee.
