= Saint Mark's Church (Jamesville, New York) =

Historic church in New York, United States

- U.S. National Register of Historic Places
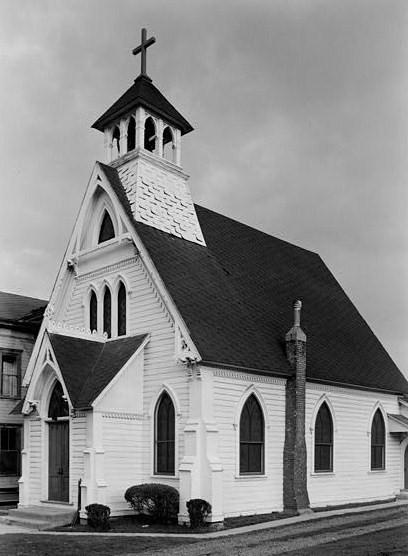
- St. Mark's Church in 1963 (HABS)

- Location within New York Location within the United States
- Location: 6492 E. Seneca Trnpk., Jamesville, New York
- Coordinates: 42°59′28″N 76°4′21″W
- Area: less than one acre
- Built: 1878
- Architectural style: Gothic Revival
- MPS: Historic Churches of the Episcopal Diocese of Central New York MPS
- NRHP reference No.: 97000114
- Added to NRHP: March 9, 1997

The Saint Mark's Church in Jamesville, New York is a Gothic Revival-style church built in 1878. It no longer functions as a church, and instead houses the Jamesville Community Museum.

The building was added to the National Register of Historic Places in 1997.

The church occupies a prominent position in the center of the hamlet of Jamesville, at the corner of E. Seneca Turnpike and Apulia Road. The Seneca Turnpike was the first highway in the region.
