= LaFayette, New York =

Town in Onondaga County, New York, U.S.

LaFayette, New York Onondaga: Tgahwisdaniyóñ·daʼ
- Town
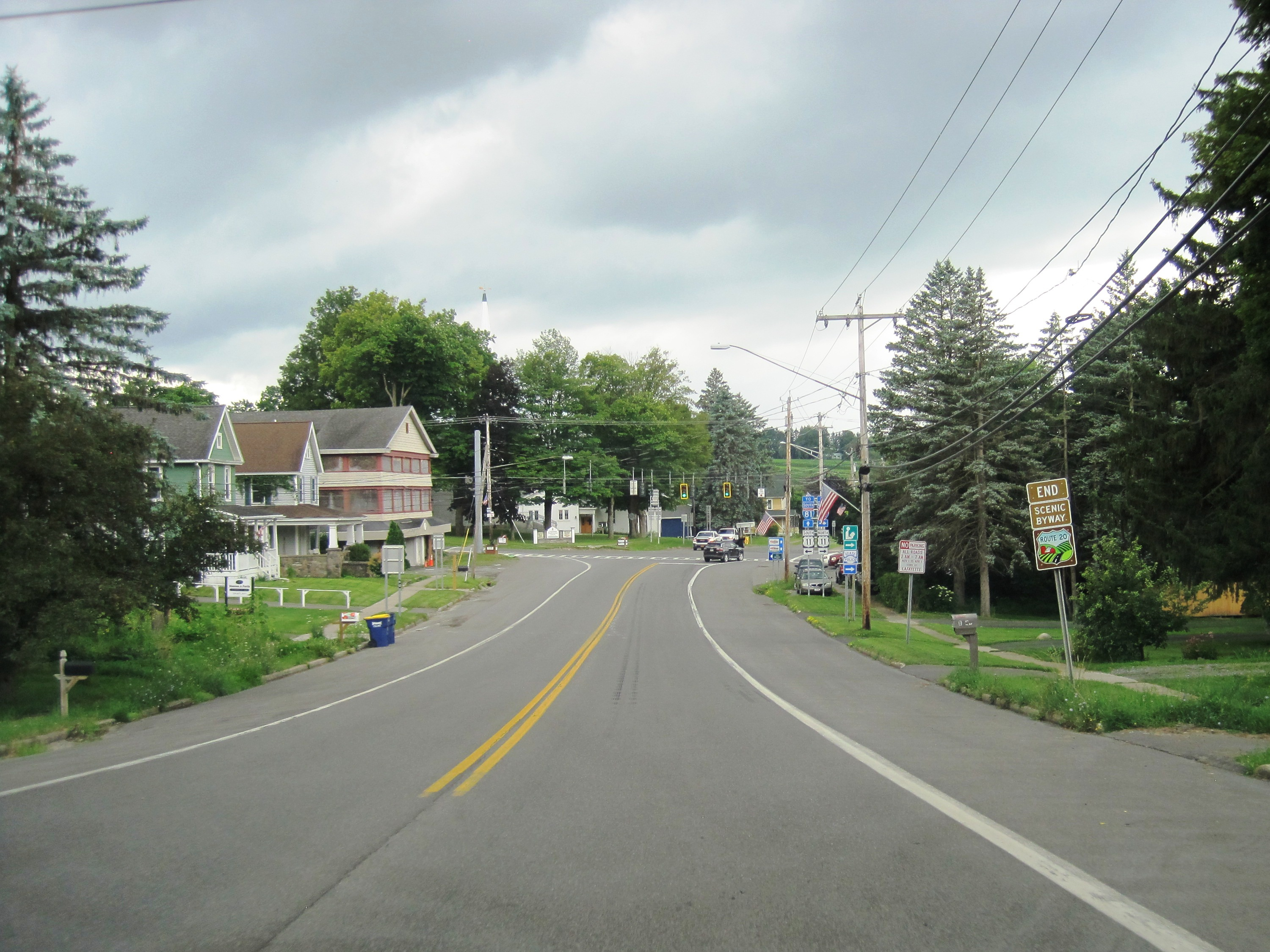
- US 20 westbound entering the hamlet of LaFayette

- Location in Onondaga County and the state of New York.
- Coordinates: 42°54′45″N 76°6′22″W
- Country: United States
- State: New York
- County: Onondaga

Government
  - Type: Town Council
  - Town Supervisor: Mark Distler (D)
  - Town Council: Members' List: • Melanie Palmer (R); • Steve Zajac (R); • Bill McConnell (R); • Carole Dwyer (R)

Area
  - Total: 39.64 sq mi (102.68 km^{2})
  - Land: 39.25 sq mi (101.65 km^{2})
  - Water: 0.40 sq mi (1.03 km^{2})
- Elevation: 1,198 ft (365 m)

Population (2020)
  - Total: 4,910
  - Density: 125/sq mi (48.3/km^{2})
- Time zone: UTC-5 (Eastern (EST))
  - Summer (DST): UTC-4 (EDT)
- ZIP Codes: 13084 (La Fayette); 13078 (Jamesville); 13159 (Tully)
- Area code: 315
- FIPS code: 36-40266
- GNIS feature ID: 0979125
- Website: www.townoflafayetteny.gov

LaFayette (Onondaga: Tgahwisdaniyóñ·daʼ ) is a town in Onondaga County, New York, United States. As of the 2020 Census, its population was 4,910. The town is named after the Marquis de Lafayette, a key figure in the French and American revolutions, and widely considered a national hero of France and the United States. LaFayette is in the southern part of Onondaga County, south of Syracuse.

== History ==
The town is located within the former Central New York Military Tract and is partly in an area reserved for members of the Onondaga people. The first settler arrived circa 1797. The land was purchased from the Onondagas in 1817 and resold to settlers. It is known as Tgahwisdaniyú·daʼ in the Onondaga language.

The town of LaFayette was formed and organized on April 15, 1825, from parts of the Towns of Pompey and Onondaga after the Marquis de Lafayette famously toured the United States in 1824/1825.

Every year, the town holds an Apple Festival on the Saturday and Sunday before Columbus Day. This is in part because most of the agricultural land west of the town has historically held apple orchards. There are a total of four apple orchards in LaFayette today.

== Geography ==
According to the United States Census Bureau, the town has a total area of 39.6 square miles (103 km^{2}), of which 39.2 square miles (102 km^{2}) is land and 0.3 square miles (0.78 km^{2}) (0.88%) is water.

North-south highways I-81 and US 11 intersect US 20 by LaFayette hamlet. NY 11A is a north-south highway in the town that parallels US 11.

== Demographics ==
Historical population
Census	Pop.	Note	%±
1830	2,560		—
1840	2,600		1.6%
1850	2,533		−2.6%
1860	2,537		0.2%
1870	2,233		−12.0%
1880	2,160		−3.3%
1890	1,874		−13.2%
1900	1,678		−10.5%
1910	1,413		−15.8%
1920	1,293		−8.5%
1930	1,438		11.2%
1940	1,550		7.8%
1950	2,083		34.4%
1960	3,379		62.2%
1970	4,401		30.2%
1980	4,488		2.0%
1990	5,105		13.7%
2000	4,833		−5.3%
2010	4,952		2.5%
2020	4,910		−0.8%
U.S. Decennial Census

As of the 2000 census, there were ,833 people, 1,826 households, and 1,338 families residing in the town. The population density was 123.1 inhabitants per square mile (47.5/km^{2}). There were 1,925 housing units at an average density of 49.0 per square mile (18.9/km^{2}). The racial makeup of the town was 95.28% White, 0.37% African American, 2.32% Native American, 0.58% Asian, 0.10% Pacific Islander, 0.12% from other races, and 1.22% from two or more races. Hispanic or Latino of any race were 0.43% of the population.

There were 1,826 households, out of which 35.7% had children under the age of 18 living with them, 60.0% were married couples living together, 9.5% had a female householder with no husband present, and 26.7% were non-families. 21.8% of all households were made up of individuals, and 8.0% had someone living alone who was 65 years of age or older. The average household size was 2.64 and the average family size was 3.09.

In the town, the population was spread out, with 26.9% under the age of 18, 6.3% from 18 to 24, 26.8% from 25 to 44, 28.0% from 45 to 64, and 12.0% who were 65 years of age or older. The median age was 40 years. For every 100 females, there were 99.1 males. For every 100 females aged 18 and over, there were 92.4 males.

The median income for a household in the town was $50,179, and the median income for a family was $60,523. Males had a median income of $40,341 versus $30,435 for females. The per capita income for the town was $24,591. About 3.3% of families and 5.1% of the population were below the poverty line, including 4.6% of those under age 18 and 5.4% of those aged 65 or over.

== Attractions ==
LaFayette has a post office, gas station, optometrist's, a McDonald's and a Byrne Dairy. It is also home to the Lafayette Junior/Senior High School and Grimshaw Elementary School.

== Communities and other locations in the Town of LaFayette ==
- Baileys Settlement – A hamlet west of Lafayette hamlet.
- Big Bend – A hamlet southeast of LaFayette hamlet on US-20.
- Cardiff – A hamlet west of LaFayette hamlet on US-20.
- Collingwood – A hamlet southwest of Big Bend.
- LaFayette – The town's largest hamlet, located at the intersection of US-11 and US-20. Sometimes referred to as "the village", though it never was incorporated as such.
- Jamesville Beach Park – a county park at the Jamesville Reservoir, south of Jamesville.
- Jamesville Reservoir – A lake located by the Jamesville Beach Park.
- Onativia – A hamlet east of LaFayette hamlet.
- Tully Valley – A location on NY-11A in the southwest part of LaFayette.
- Webb Hollow – A location on Webb Road, around the intersection with Shute Road, northwest of the LaFayette hamlet. It is so named for the hollow in the creek that runs alongside Webb Road, the true name of which is Webb Hollow Road.

== Notable person ==
- Gerrit T. Thorn, Wisconsin legislator and lawyer, was born in Lafayette.
