= Butternut Lake (Meeker County, Minnesota) =

Lake in the state of Minnesota, United States

- Location within Minnesota
- Location: Meeker County, Minnesota
- Coordinates: 45°3′34″N 94°18′23″W
- Type: Lake
- Surface elevation: 1,083 feet (330 m)

Butternut Lake is a lake in Meeker County, in the U.S. state of Minnesota.

Butternut Lake was named for the butternut trees near the lake.

== See also ==
- List of lakes in Minnesota
