= Oran Community Church =

Historic church in New York, United States

- U.S. National Register of Historic Places
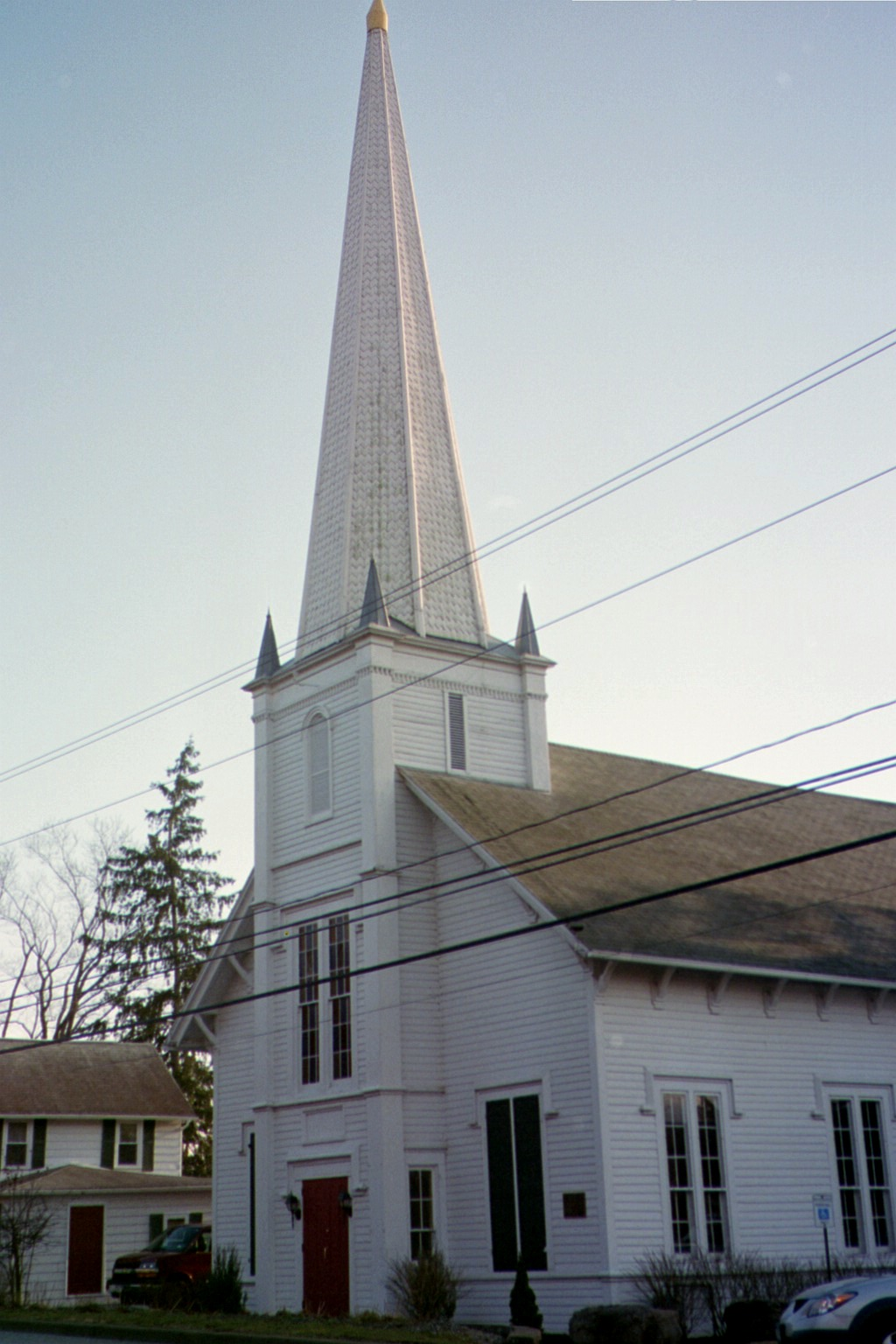

- Location within New York Location within the United States
- Location: 8560 Cazenovia Rd, Pompey, New York
- Coordinates: 42°58′44.12″N 75°56′8.7″W
- Built: 1851
- Architect: Sweet, John Edson; Little, Truman
- Architectural style: Gothic Revival, Greek Revival
- NRHP reference No.: 01001503
- Added to NRHP: January 24, 2002

The Oran Community Church was built in 1851 in Pompey, New York. The architect was John Edson Sweet and the builder was Truman Little.

== Gallery ==
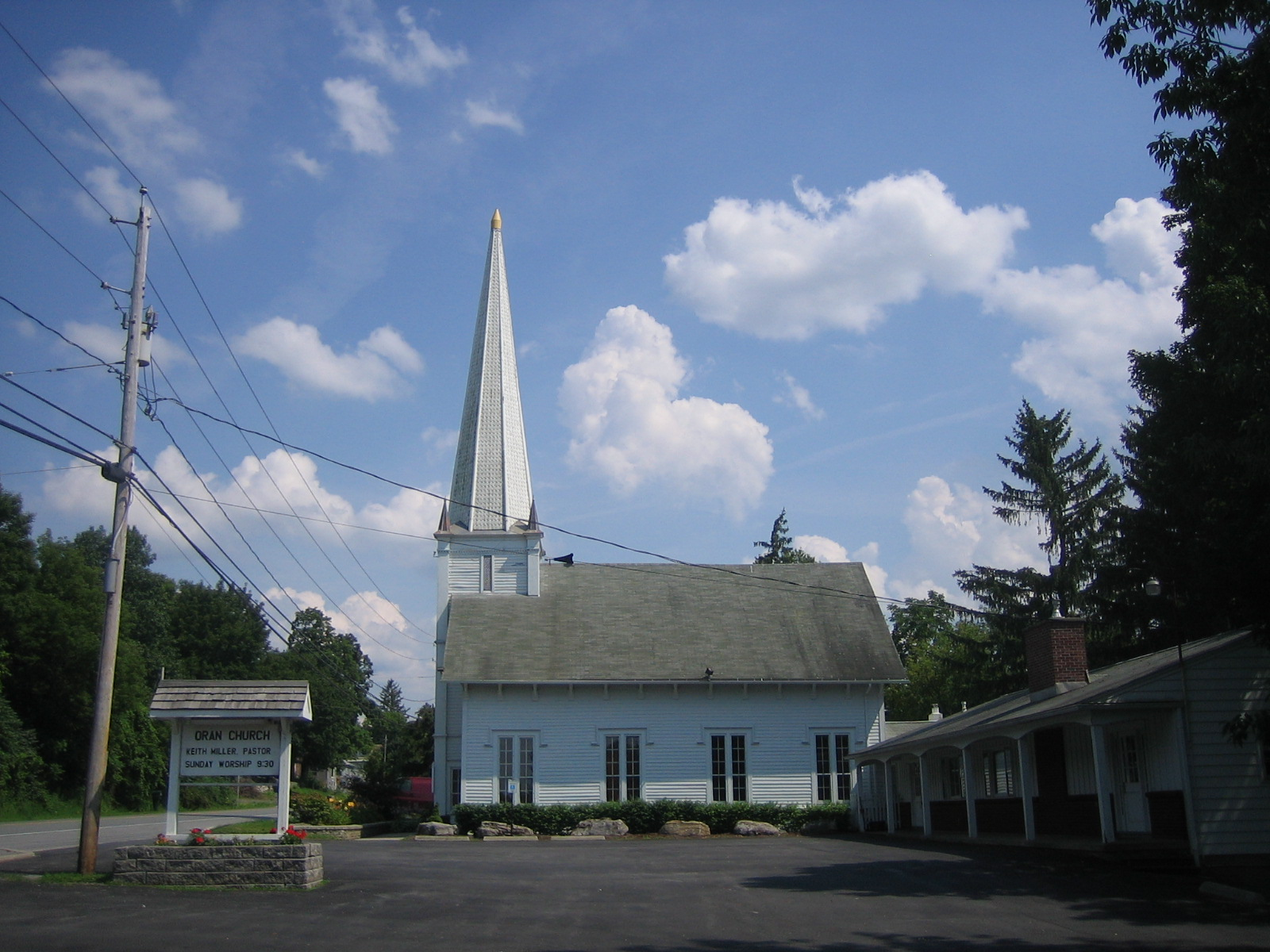
Side view, in 2009
