= Southwood Two-Teacher School =

- U.S. National Register of Historic Places
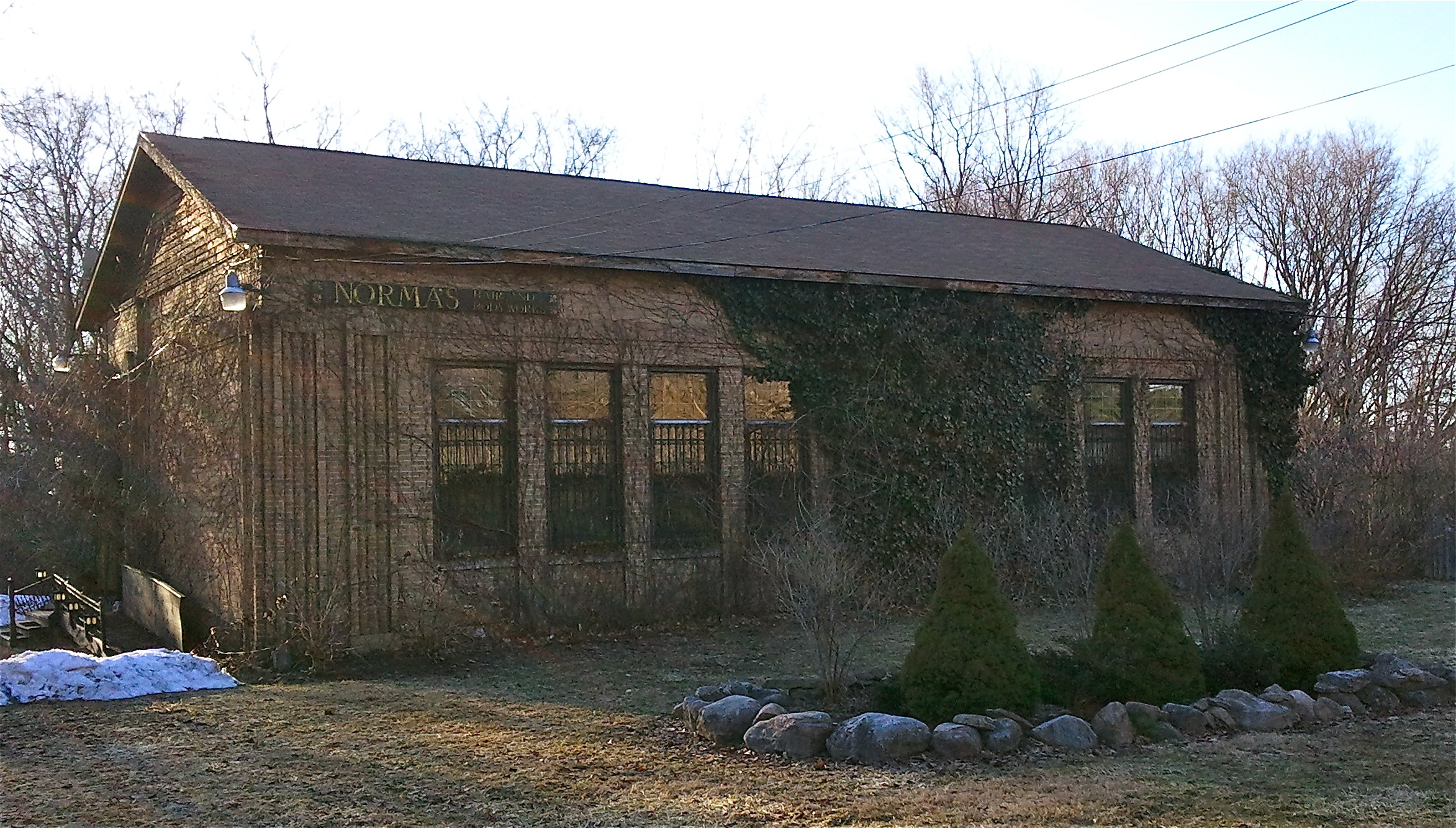

- Location within New York Location within the United States
- Location: Barker Hill Rd., near Jamesville, New York
- Coordinates: 42°59′42″N 76°6′34″W
- Area: 2.8 acres (1.1 ha)
- Built: 1937-1938
- Architect: O'Connor, Fred
- Architectural style: Art Deco
- NRHP reference No.: 00000349
- Added to NRHP: April 6, 2000

The Southwood Two-Teacher Schoolhouse is a historic school building located on Barker Hill Road just south of East Seneca Turnpike, in the Southwood neighborhood of the town of Onondaga, New York. Further east along the turnpike is the hamlet of Jamesville, New York. The two-teacher school was built in 1937–1938, and is a one-story, yellow brick Art Deco style building, but the ivy hides any architectural details that would show that. The rectangular building has a full concrete block basement and is topped by a flat roof. It remained in use as a school until 1966.

It was listed on the National Register of Historic Places in 2000.

It now serves as a restaurant called "School and Vine."
