= USS Butternut =

1941 Aloe-class net laying ship

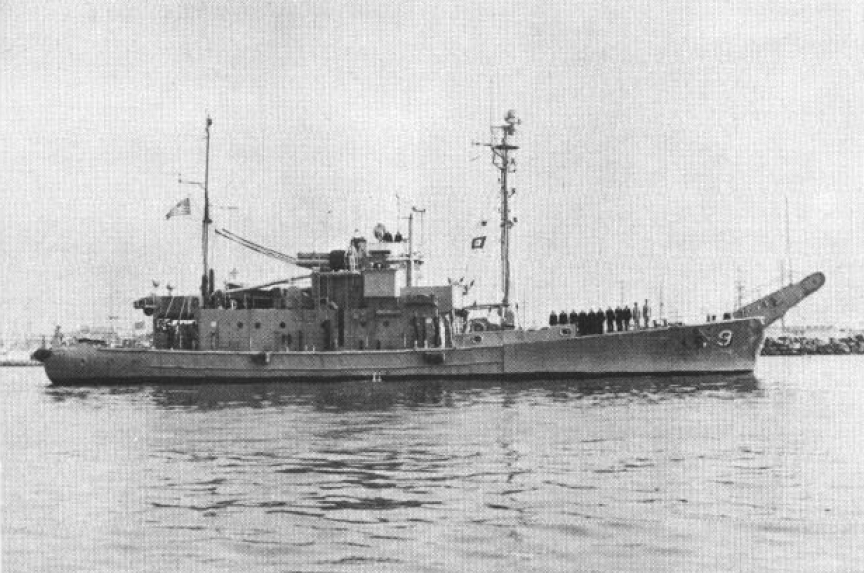
- USS Butternut (AN-9) in 1965

History

United States
- Name: USS Butternut (YAG-60)
- Builder: Lake Washington Shipyard, Houghton, Washington
- Laid down: 11 March 1941, as YN-4 (Yard Net Tender)
- Launched: 10 May 1941
- Commissioned: 13 May 1942
- Decommissioned: 18 July 1969
- Reclassified: AN-9 (Net Laying Ship), January 1944; ANL-9 (Net Laying Ship), 1 January 1969; YAG-60, 1969
- Stricken: 18 July 1969
- Honours and awards: 1 battle star (World War II)
- Fate: Destroyed as a target, June 1977

General characteristics
- Class & type: Aloe-class net laying ship
- Displacement: 500 long tons (508 t) light; 760 long tons (772 t) full load
- Length: 151 ft 8 in (46.23 m)
- Beam: 30 ft 6 in (9.30 m)
- Draft: 10 ft 6 in (3.20 m)
- Propulsion: Diesel engine, single shaft
- Speed: 14 knots (26 km/h; 16 mph)
- Complement: 40
- Armament: 1 × single 3"/50 caliber gun mount; 3 × 20 mm guns; 1 × depth charge projector (Y-gun)

USS Butternut (AN-9/YN-4/ANL-9/YAG-60) was laid down as a yard net tender on 11 March 1941 at Houghton, Washington, by the Lake Washington Shipyard; launched on 10 May 1941; and placed in service at the Puget Sound Navy Yard on 3 September 1941.

After fitting out at Puget Sound the ship began service with the Inshore Patrol, 13th Naval District, early in October. She tended antisubmarine nets and performed minesweeping tasks until May 1942. On 13 May 1942, USS Butternut was placed in commission at Seattle, Washington .

== World War II Pacific Theater operations ==
The ship departed Seattle, Washington, on 17 May for a brief visit to San Francisco, California, until 1 June when she got underway for the southwestern Pacific. After escorting SS Elbridge Gerry across the ocean, Butternut arrived in Nouméa, New Caledonia, on 27 June. For 18 months, she tended nets in the southwestern Pacific, first at New Caledonia, later in the New Hebrides, and then in the Solomons. Her active service was interrupted only by two repair periods – August and September 1943 at Port Chalmers, New Zealand, and November 1943 to February 1944 at Pearl Harbor.

During her overhaul at Pearl Harbor, she was reclassified a net laying ship and was redesignated AN-9. In January 1945, the ship steamed from the Solomons via Humboldt Bay, New Guinea, to Leyte in the Philippines. She spent the ensuing two years engaged in net and other district craft operations in the waters adjacent to the islands of Leyte and Samar.

== Post-War net laying assignments ==
USS Butternut departed Leyte Gulf in convoy on 24 February 1947 and shaped a course for the Marianas. She arrived at Guam on 9 March and began three years of service in the Trust Territories of the Pacific Ocean Islands. Based at Apra Harbor on Guam, she carried passengers and cargo among the islands as well as laying and tending nets at various islands. The ship also performed several assignments off Iwo Jima laying mooring buoys and assisting in the recovery, repair and replacement of submarine lines. the ship departed Guam on 19 June 1950 for repairs at the Pearl Harbor Naval Shipyard. The net laying ship completed repairs and put to sea on 15 September. Steaming via Guam and Iwo Jima, she arrived in Sasebo, Japan, on 28 October. The ship conducted operations at Sasebo and Yokosuka, Japan, until 7 July 1951 when she set sail for Guam to resume her former duties in the Trust Territories.

On 12 December 1951, USS Butternut arrived in Pearl Harbor for regular overhaul. She completed repairs almost eight months later, putting to sea for the west coast of the United States. The net laying ship reached San Francisco, California, on 15 August 1952 but moved south to San Diego, California, soon thereafter. Assigned to the 11th Naval District, USS Butternut spent a little more than five years operating in and around San Diego tending nets and buoys as well as serving as a training platform for students at the Naval Net School, Tiburon, California, and for members of the U.S. Naval Reserve.

== Pacific missile test support ==
In 1957, however, her mission changed significantly with the de-emphasis of nets in harbor defense in favor of more sophisticated techniques. On 14 December 1957, the Naval Ordnance Test Station (NOTS), China Lake, California, assumed operational control of USS Butternut. Administrative control remained with the commandant, 11th Naval District.

For the next seven years, the ship provided support services for the Polaris missile test and development program. In addition to serving as a monitoring platform for the scientists and engineers engaged in the program, USS Butternut towed hardware and support craft to and from the San Clemente Island test site, conducted surveys of the ocean bottom at the site, carried missiles to the site, and performed a myriad of other support services. In 1964, the U.S. Navy concluded its Polaris missile tests at San Clemente Island and closed the facility there. China Lake, however, retained operational control over Butternut for the purpose of testing the Mark 46 anti-submarine warfare (ASW) torpedo and its first modification. That duty, punctuated by repair periods, occupied her until the summer of 1969.

== Decommissioning ==
Found to be excess to the needs of the U.S. Navy late in June 1969, USS Butternut was decommissioned at San Diego, California, on 18 July 1969, and her name was struck from the navy list that same day.

== Post-decommissioning activity ==
Almost immediately, however, she was reinstated on the list of service craft as YAG-60 for service on the Pacific Missile Range. That assignment lasted for about two years until June 1971. On 1 July 1971, her service craft designation was struck from the navy list. Early in 1972, she became a salvage training hulk for Service Squadron (ServRon) 5 at Maui in the Hawaiian Islands. She was so employed until June 1977 at which time she was destroyed as a target.

== Awards ==
USS Butternut received one battle star for World War II service.
