= Butternut Valley =

Butternut Valley may refer to:

- Butternut Valley Township, Blue Earth County, Minnesota
- Butternut Valley, the valley surrounding Butternuts Creek and the Unadilla River, which flow through the town of Butternuts, New York
- Butternut Valley, New Brunswick, a rural community in the Canadian province of New Brunswick
