= Jamesville Beach Park =

Park in LaFayette, New York, United States

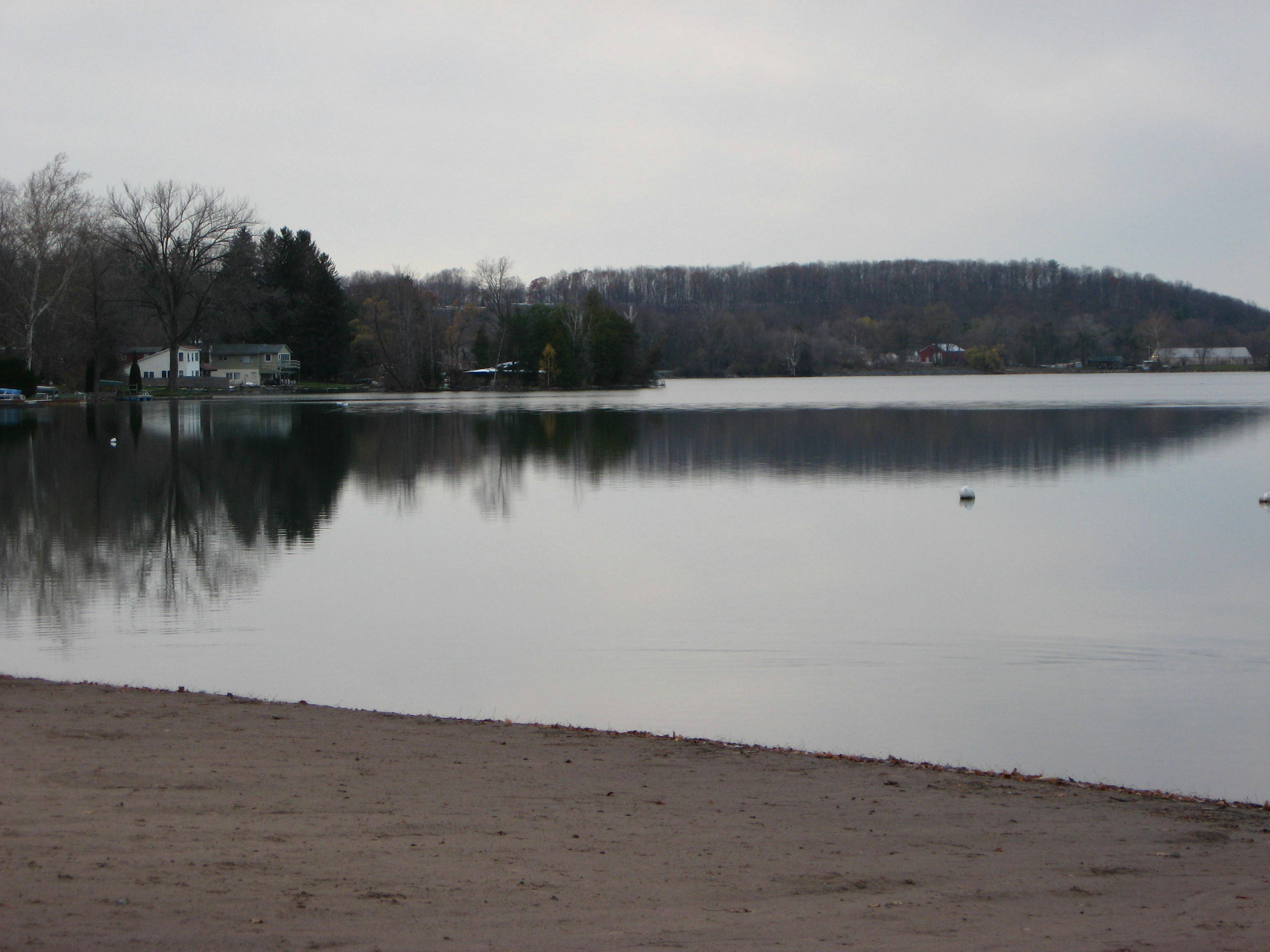
- Beach at Jamesville Reservoir
- Interactive map of Jamesville Beach Park
- Type: County park
- Location: LaFayette, New York
- Coordinates: 42.96547°N 76.07147°W
- Operator: Onondaga County Parks
- Open: April-October
- Website: onondagacountyparks.com/parks/jamesville-beach-park

Jamesville Beach Park is an Onondaga County park in LaFayette, New York, just south of the hamlet of Jamesville. A lifeguard oversees the 100 yards of waterfront that includes both shallow and deep areas.

== Activities ==
Jamesville Beach Park offers a wide range of facilities including athletic fields, disc golf, playgrounds, swimming, trails, and volleyball. Dogs are allowed to be off-leash in designated areas, however must be leashed on the hiking trails.

== Events ==
Jamesville Beach Park is host to events throughout the year that include an Ironman Triathlon and balloon festival in June, and a Canine Carnival in the fall.
