= Jamesville, New York =

Jamesville, New York Onondaga: Gahsóñhdoʼ
- hamlet
- Location within the state of New York
- Coordinates: 42°59′31″N 76°4′18″W
- Country: United States
- State: New York
- County: Onondaga
- Time zone: UTC-5 (Eastern (EST))
  - Summer (DST): UTC-4 (EDT)
- ZIP code: 13078
- Area codes: 315 and 680

Jamesville (Onondaga: Gahsóñhdoʼ) is a hamlet made up of the outskirts of five towns: DeWitt, LaFayette, Manlius, Pompey and Onondaga. Jamesville is located in Onondaga County, New York, United States, part of the greater Syracuse area.

== History ==
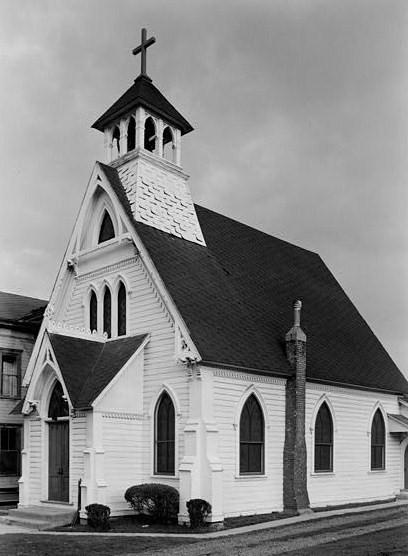
St. Mark's Episcopal Church, Jamesville

The hamlet was named for early European-American settler James DeWitt. It was settled in the early Federal period after the American Revolutionary War, when the indigenous Haudenosaunee had been forced to cede their lands in New York to the United States.

The Dr. John Ives House, Saint Mark's Church, and Southwood Two-Teacher School are listed on the National Register of Historic Places.

=== 2007 plant proposal ===
On January 16, 2007, a New York City company, Empire Synfuel LLC, submitted an application for site plan approval for a proposed coal gasification plant in Jamesville. It was to take over the site where the now abandoned Alpha Portland Cement factory once operated. The plant, projected to cost $1.3 billion and create up to 150 jobs, would have converted coal into synthetic natural gas.

The proposal faced opposition from area residents and town board members, who were concerned about such environmental issues as the proximity of the village's elementary school.

In addition, environmentalists opposed the plant because its releases of carbon dioxide would contribute to global warming.

The project was proposed at another site 40 mi (64 km) north, in the Town of Scriba. According to the Sierra Club, the second proposal was also defeated.

== Jamesville Reservoir ==
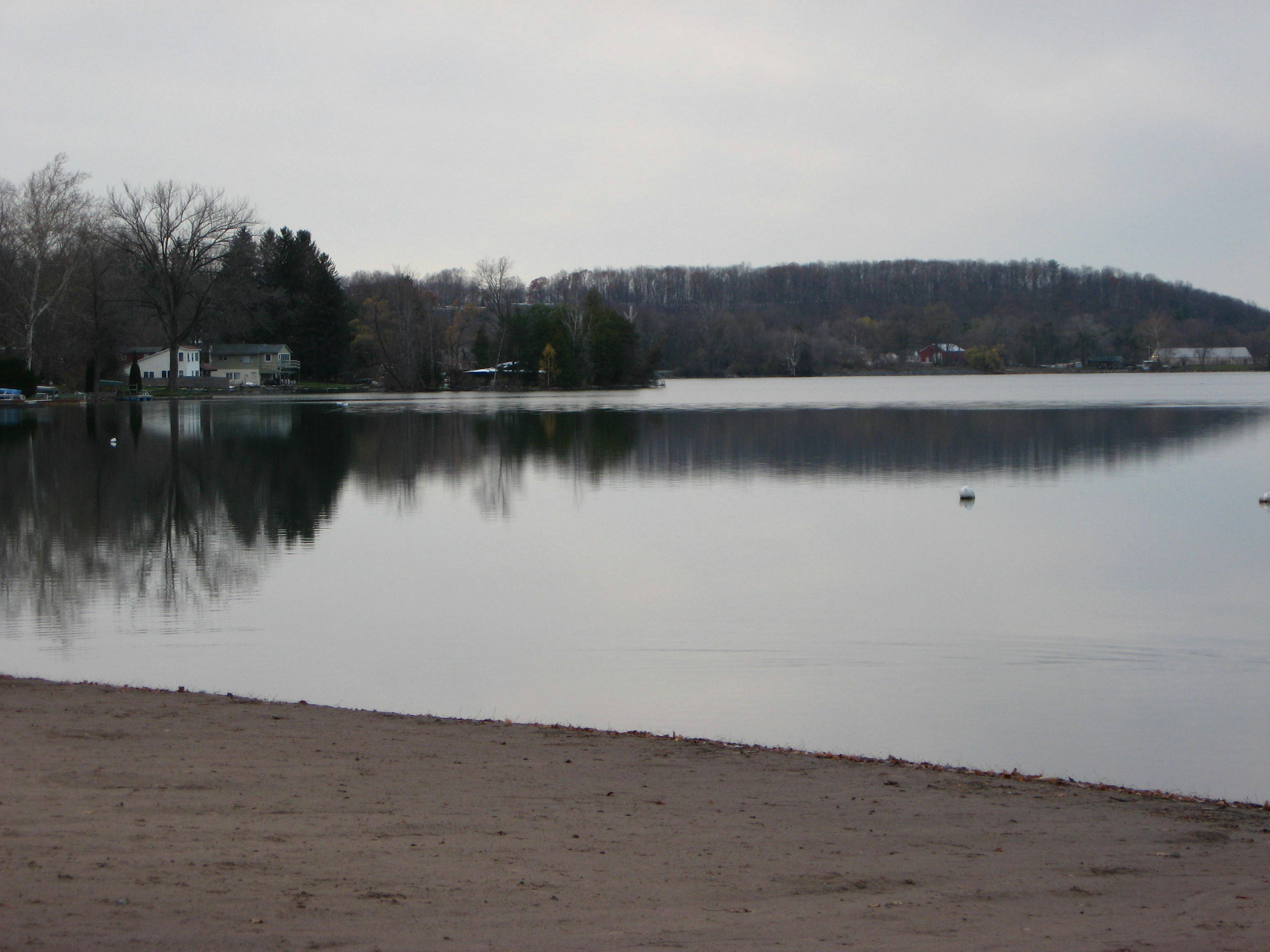
Jamesville Reservoir

The Jamesville Reservoir is south of the hamlet. Jamesville Beach Park, a county park, includes a small beach on the reservoir, several hiking trails and fields. The fields are the site of the annual Jamesville BalloonFest, where dozens of hot-air balloons take to the air in one weekend. Both the reservoir and park are in the Town of LaFayette, New York, a larger jurisdiction that encompasses Jamesville.

== Notable people ==
- Henry A. Barnum, Civil War veteran and Medal of Honor recipient
- Ben Burtt, sound designer known for his work on Star Wars and Indiana Jones films
- Danny Cedrone, guitarist known for his work with Bill Haley & His Comets on "Rock Around the Clock"
- Danny Schayes, former professional basketball player in the NBA; son of Dolph Schayes
