= Limestone Creek (Chittenango Creek tributary) =

River in New York State, U.S.

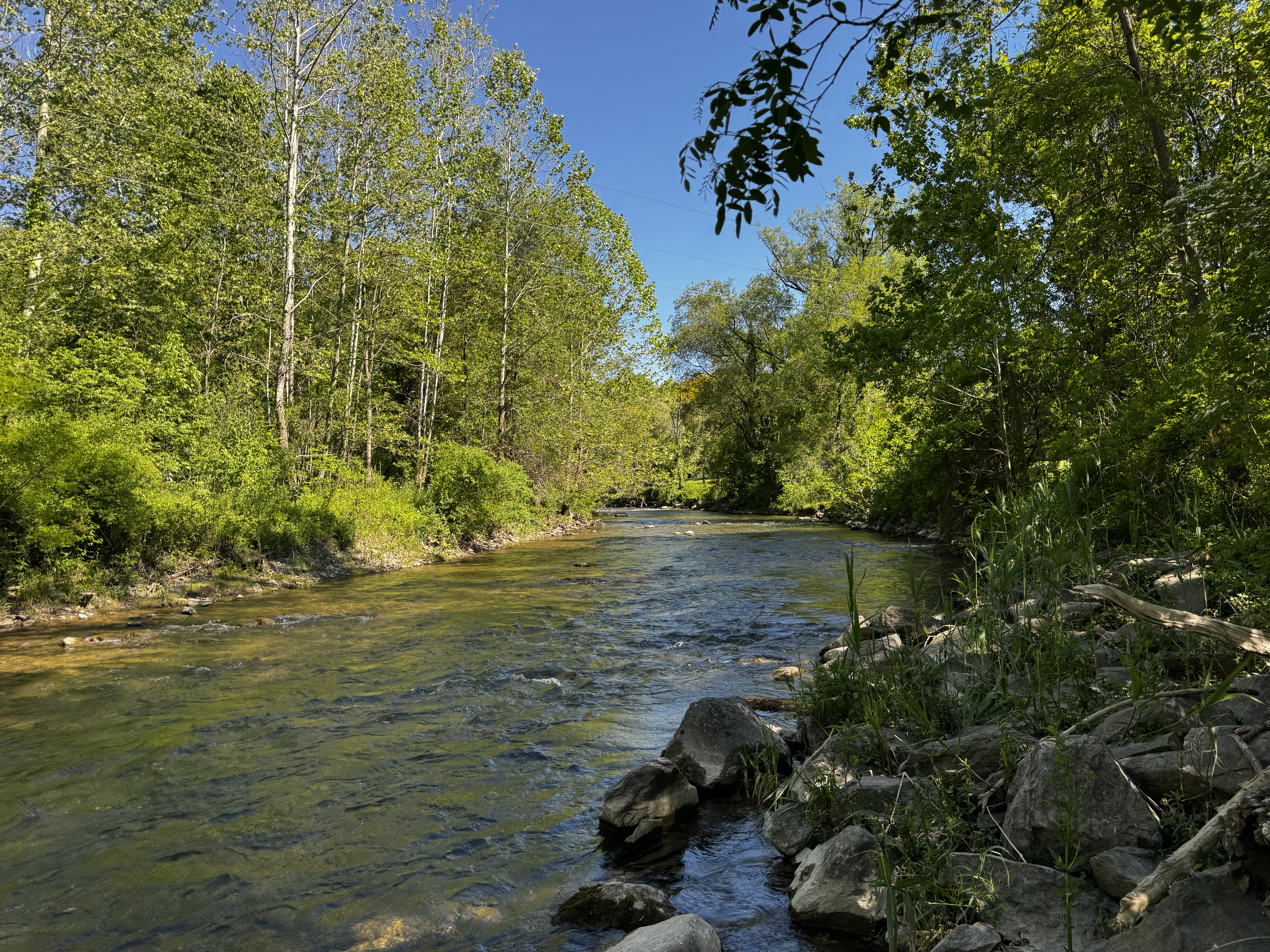
- Flowing through the Gramlich Bird Preserve in Fayetteville, New York

Location
- Country: United States
- State: New York

Physical characteristics
- Source
  - location: by DeRuyter Reservoir
- Mouth: Chittenango Creek
  - location: Northeast of Minoa
  - coordinates: 43°06′13″N 75°58′33″W

Basin features
- Progression: Limestone Creek → Chittenango Creek → Oneida Lake → Oneida River → Oswego River → Lake Ontario → St. Lawrence River → Gulf of St. Lawrence → Atlantic Ocean
- Tributaries
  - left: Butternut Creek

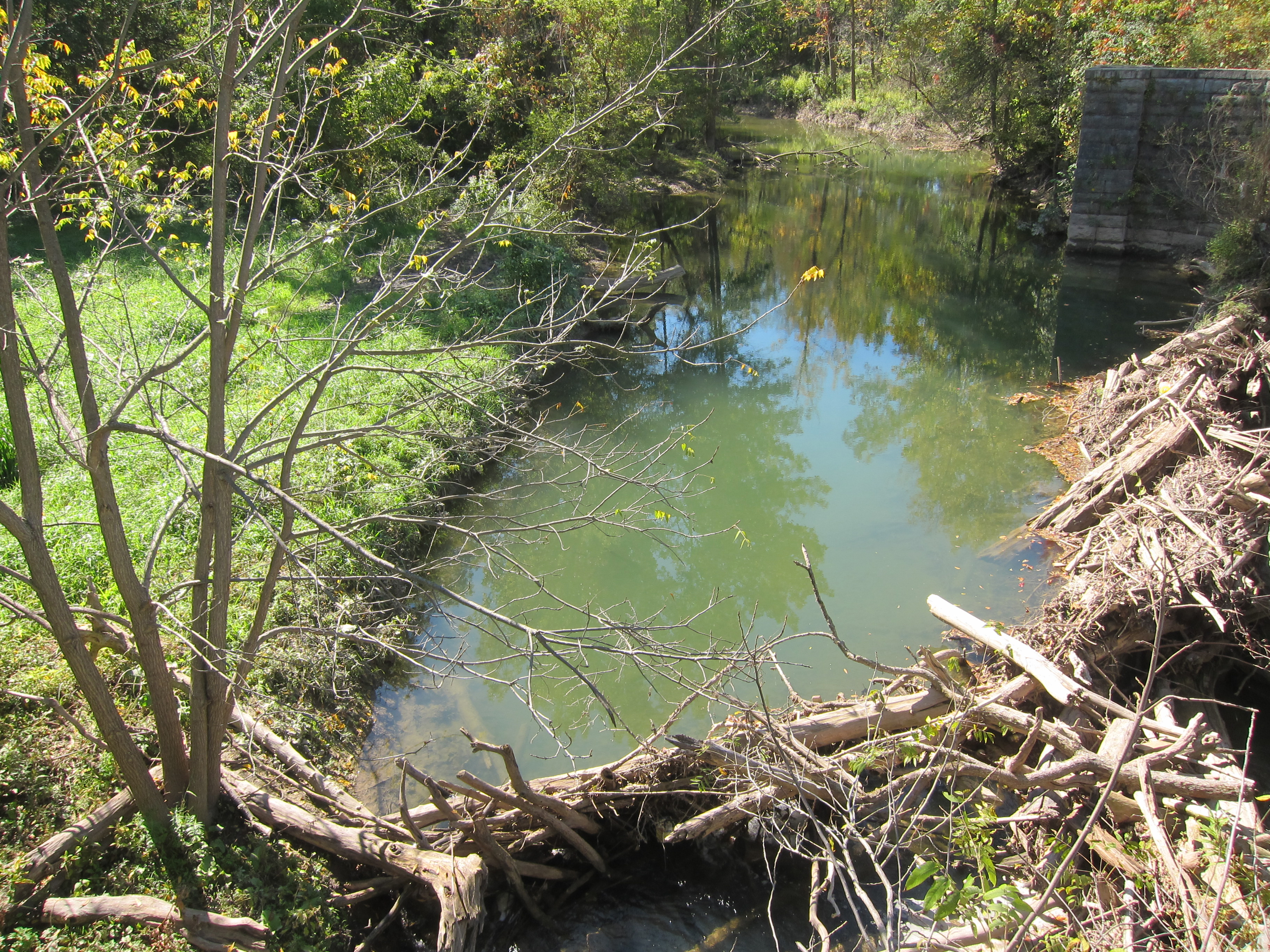
A beaver dam on Limestone Creek near the Erie Canal

Limestone Creek is a 25-mile-long (40 km) river in Onondaga County and Madison County in the state of New York. From its source around DeRuyter Reservoir, the creek flows generally north, passing through the villages of Manlius and Fayetteville, to its confluence with Chittenango Creek.

Limestone Creek supplied water to a number of mills along its course in the 19th century. This included mills in the villages of Manlius and Fayetteville. Fayetteville was supplied by the 2.6-mile-long (4.2 km) Ledyard Dike, which diverted some water from the canal as early as the 1850s. Beginning in the 1890s, water could be diverted around Fayetteville into the Erie Canal. In the 1900s hydroelectric power from the creek powered the Syracuse and Suburban Railroad, which terminated in Manlius near Edwards Falls.

During the 20th century, regular flooding of the creek in Manlius became a major problem, leading to several flood control projects in the 1990s. The creek today is a popular site for trout fishing, and its watershed—primarily forested or agricultural—contains several parks including Delphi Falls County Park and Pratt's Falls County Park.

== Course ==
=== East Branch ===
The East Branch of Limestone Creek flows through Cazenovia and by Erieville before joining the mainstem north of Delphi Falls. The mainstem itself is also sometimes referred to as the creek's east branch.

=== West Branch ===
The West Branch originates towards Pompey and drops over 200 feet (61 m) in 2 miles (3.2 km), including going over the 75-foot (23 m) Brickyard Falls, before it meets the main stem in Manlius. Along the way it receives as a tributary Pratts Falls Brook.

=== Main stem ===
The main stem of Limestone Creek is approximately 25 miles (40 km) long. It originates as the outflow of DeRuyter Reservoir. It then flows for about 9.5 miles (15.3 km), receiving its east branch and going over the two tiers of Delphi Falls, before reaching the town of Manlius.

The creek then flows through Manlius, where it goes over Edwards Falls, is joined by its west branch, and receives outflow from White Lake, before heading towards Fayetteville and passing under the Erie Canal near Green Lakes State Park. Around this point it receives Butternut Creek from the west below Minoa. Downstream of there, it empties into Chittenango Creek which continues a few miles north to Oneida Lake.

== Ecology ==
From 1939 to 1986 the United States Geological Survey maintained a stream gauging station on Limestone Creek in Fayettevile, accounting for a watershed of 85.5 square miles (221 km^{2}). In 1985, the Creek's mean water discharge was 105.868 cubic feet (2.9978 m^{3}) per second, peaking in January at 248.935 cubic feet (7.0491 m^{3}) per second, and reaching its lowest flow rate at 21.577 cubic feet (0.6110 m^{3}) per second in September. A report published by the Army Corps of Engineers in 1990 reported that the creek's maximum flow ever recorded was 7,490 cubic feet (212 m^{3}) cubic feet per second, in October 1981.

The West Branch of Limestone Creek drains about 23.1 square miles (60 km^{2}) of the creek's watershed.

== History ==
Settlement by Europeans in the area that became Manlius began as early as 1790, and a sawmill had been built on Limestone Creek by 1793. The creek had several additional mills constructed along its course throughout the 19th century.

=== Ledyard Dike ===
Approximate route of the Ledyard Canal in 1860.

Fundraising to build a canal to divert water from Limestone Creek into Fayetteville began in the 1830s, and construction began on what became known as the Ledyard Dike (also known as the Ledyard Hydraulic Canal) in 1845. The course was surveyed by George Geddes. A dam was built west of Manlius, and water diverted into a channel that flowed roughly parallel to Limestone Creek for 2.6 miles (4.2 km) into Fayetteville. The canal ranged from 2–4 feet (0.61–1.22 m) deep and 8–20 feet (2.4–6.1 m) wide, and was completed by 1850. There were two ponds along its course to store water. It supplied water to at least three mills before returning to Limestone Creek.

By the 1970s, the dam that supplied water to the dike was in declining condition and in need of repairs. The Ledyard Dike was still in use by a paper mill. Flooding in 1981 destroyed the dam on Limestone Creek, and the dike was connected instead to Perry Springs, in Manlius.

Local citizens as well as the town of Fayetteville made efforts to construct a walking path along the canal as early as 1909, when Charles Mulford Robinson, again in the late 1970s, and again in 1997, but all efforts were unsuccessful. The dike is documented in the Historic American Engineering Record.

=== Later development (1856–present) ===
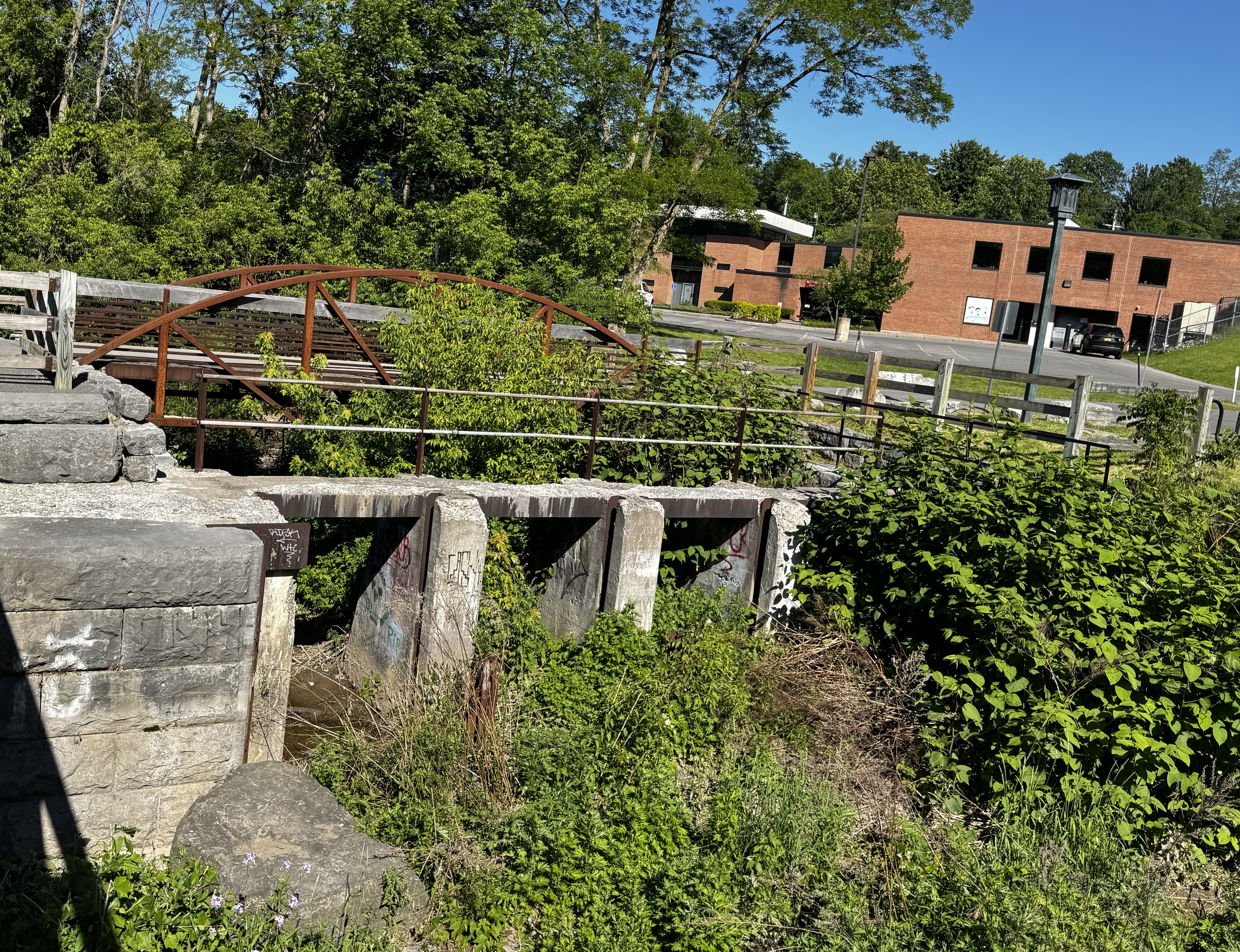
The old sluice gates that let water from Limestone Creek flow towards the Erie Canal

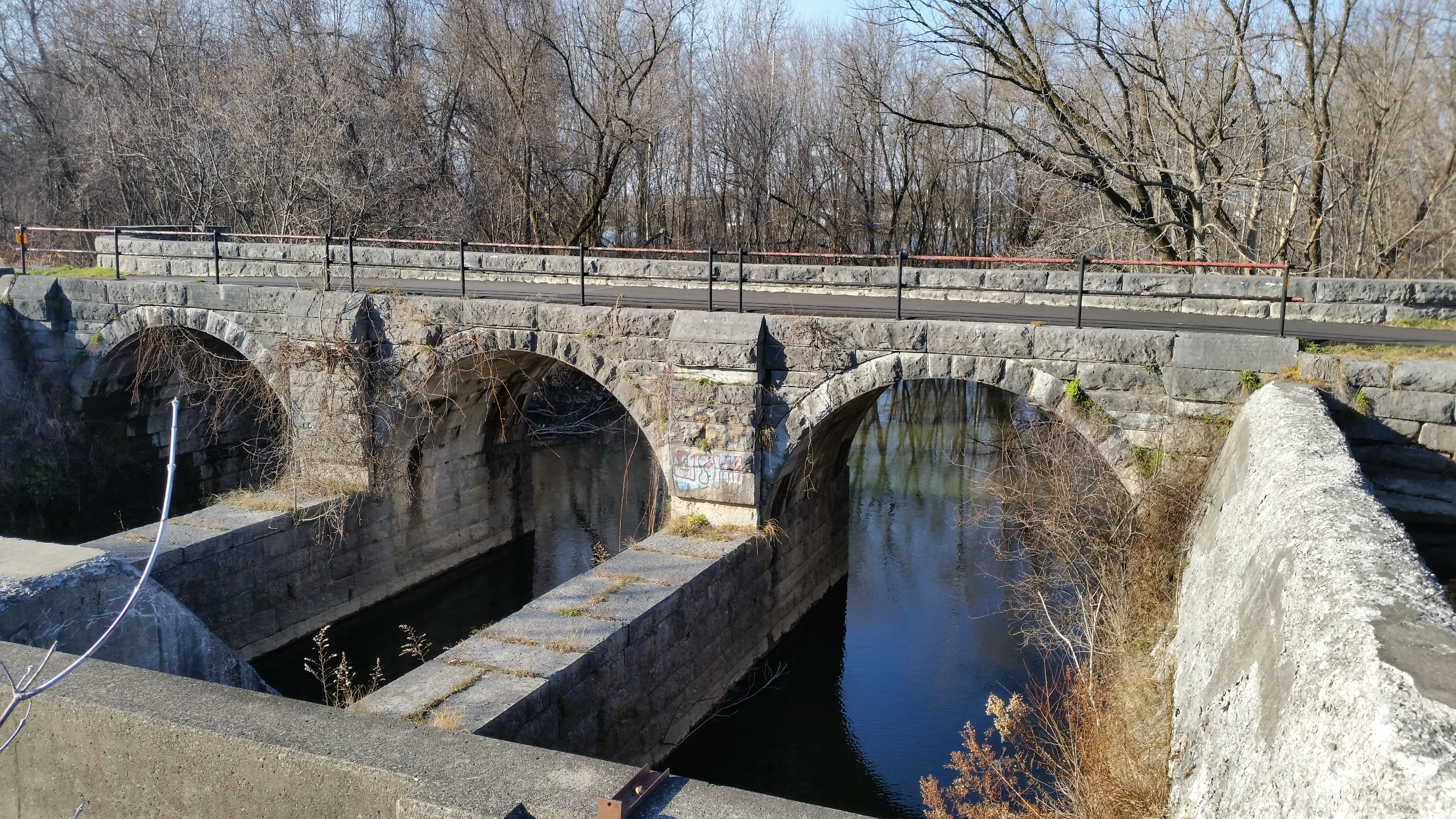
An aqueduct carries the old Erie Canal over the creek.

The Limestone Creek Aqueduct, completed in 1856, carries the Enlarged Erie Canal across Limestone Creek. It is a three-span stone structure 79 feet (24 m) long, supporting a concrete aqueduct and the old towpath (now the Erie Canalway Trail). In 1896 a weir was built that dammed the river's flow. Sluice gates allowed water from Limestone Creek to flow into the canal. The dam partially collapsed in 2009 and was fully removed shortly afterwards.

In around 1897, a hydroelectric plant was built on the creek near Edwards Falls to power the Syracuse and Suburban Railroad line, which terminated in Manlius. The plant was closed around 1931.

Throughout the 20th century, the creek's watershed became much more forested. In the 1930s, an estimated 19.9% was forested, while by the 1980s and 1990s that figure had risen to 51.5%. Over the same time period, land used for agricultural purposes declined from 77% to 40.1%, while urban land cover rose from 3.1% to 8.4%. In the 1950s, the New York State Department of Health raised concerns over pollution of the creek, noting that untreated sewage was dumped into it by the towns of Manlius and Fayetteville.

In 2002, a large portion of hillside in the East Branch's valley, near New Woodstock, collapsed into the branch, threatening to suffocate the natural trout population with heavy amounts of silt. In response, Madison County dug a new channel and rerouted the creek through it.

== Flooding ==
The creek saw major flooding in years including 1898, 1915, 1950, 1974, and 1981, particularly in the town of Manlius. In 1959, The Post-Standard described it as flooding regularly every spring, but reported that the Army Corps of Engineers (COE) considered the damages too minor to merit substantial flood control works. After the 1981 flood, which caused damages estimated at $800,000, New York State began a flood control project, and in 1991 the COE proposed $7.2 million in work, including widening portions of the creek, building overflow channels, and building walls to block flooding. Construction on flood control projects continued throughout the 1990s.

== Recreation ==
The creek is popularly used for trout fishing, and portions of it are stocked by Onondaga County. Portions are navigable by canoe or kayak.

Parks along the creek include Delphi Falls County Park, Mill Run Park (in Manlius), and Canal Landing Park (in Fayetteville).

== See also ==
- List of rivers of New York
- Old Erie Canal State Historic Park
