= Pompey, New York =

- Town
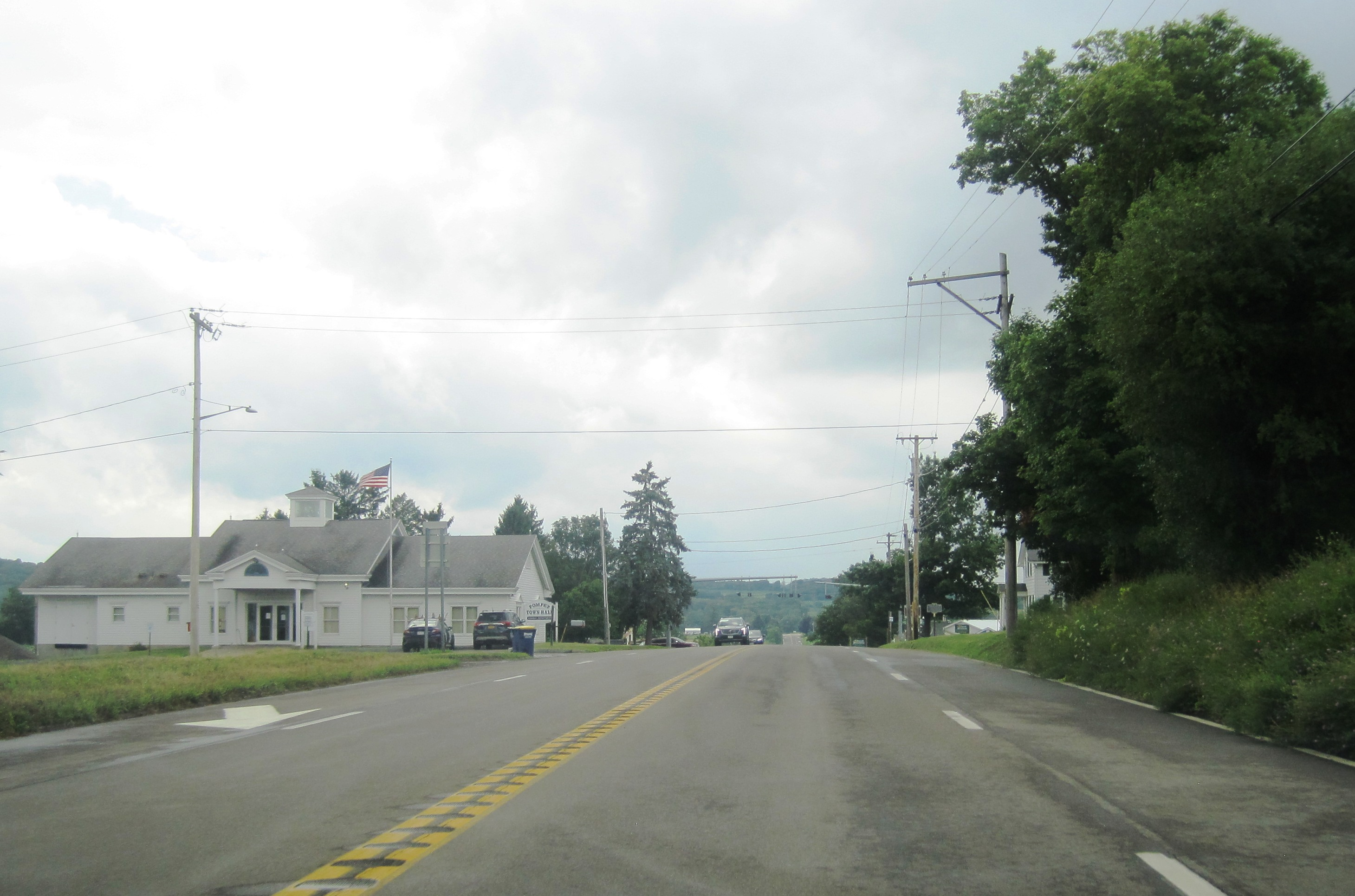
- Pompey Center along US 20 westbound; the Pompey town hall is on the left

- Location in Onondaga County and the state of New York.
- Coordinates: 42°53′56″N 76°00′57″W
- Country: United States
- State: New York
- County: Onondaga

Government
  - Type: Town Council
  - Town Supervisor: Mark Nardella (R)
  - Town Council: Members' List: • Sheila Larkin(R); • Ann Christmas(R); • Carl Dennis (R); • Judy McElhannon (R)

Area
  - Total: 66.48 sq mi (172.17 km^{2})
  - Land: 66.38 sq mi (171.92 km^{2})
  - Water: 0.097 sq mi (0.25 km^{2})
- Elevation: 1,457 ft (444 m)

Population (2020)
  - Total: 7,080
  - Density: 107/sq mi (41.2/km^{2})
- Time zone: UTC-5 (Eastern (EST))
  - Summer (DST): UTC-4 (EDT)
- ZIP code: 13138, 13078, 13104
- Area code: 315
- FIPS code: 36-59036
- GNIS feature ID: 0979383
- Website: www.townofpompey.org

Pompey is a town in the southeast part of Onondaga County, New York, United States. As of the 2020 Census, the population was 7,080. The town was named after the Roman general and political leader Pompey by a late 18th-century clerk interested in the Classics in the new federal republic.

== History ==
The area of Pompey was originally part of the territory traditionally occupied by the Onondaga, one of the Five Nations of the Haudenosaunee Confederacy, or Iroquois. After the American Revolutionary War, when most of the Haudenosaunee were forced to cede their land to the victorious United States, many of the Onondaga migrated to Canada. The British Crown awarded them land there for resettlement for their support during the war. New York State took over the former Haudenosaunee lands and sold much of the public land for development (and speculation). It reserved part as the Central New York Military Tract. Veterans of the Revolution were awarded land grants in this tract as payments for service. The town was first settled by outsiders around 1789, as Yankees from New England and other migrants moved into western New York.

The town of Pompey was formed in 1789, but not completely organized until 1794, when Onondaga County was established. The original town was divided and sub-divided into many other towns in the region, including all of the towns of Fabius (1798), Tully, Preble, and Scott (the latter two now in Cortland County), along with parts of the towns of Spafford, Otisco (1806), LaFayette (1825), Onondaga (1794), Truxton and Cuyler (the latter two now in Cortland County).

The hamlet of Pompey developed about 10.5 miles (17 km) south of the main east-west Native American trail across the state, used for generations. European-American settlers improved the trail and developed it as the Genesee Road (1794) and then the Seneca Turnpike (1800), running through the villages of Cazenovia, Manlius and Onondaga Hollow (south of Syracuse). The segment of modern U.S. Route 20 (US 20), which connects Cazenovia and Skaneateles by way of Pompey and LaFayette, was not built until 1934.

The 1820 discovery of the Pompey stone was understood as proof of early European presence in North America, but it was decades later identified as a hoax.

The Oran District No. 22 Schoolhouse and Drover's Tavern at Oran are listed on the National Register of Historic Places.

== Geography ==
According to the United States Census Bureau, the town has a total area of 66.5 square miles (172 km^{2}), of which 66.4 square miles (172 km^{2}) is land and 0.1 square miles (0.26 km^{2}) (0.09%) is water.

The town is located south of Syracuse. The eastern town line borders the edge of Madison County.

US 20 is an east-west highway through the town. New York State Route 91 (NY 91), a north-south highway, intersects US 20 in Pompey hamlet. NY 92 cuts across the northwestern corner of Pompey.

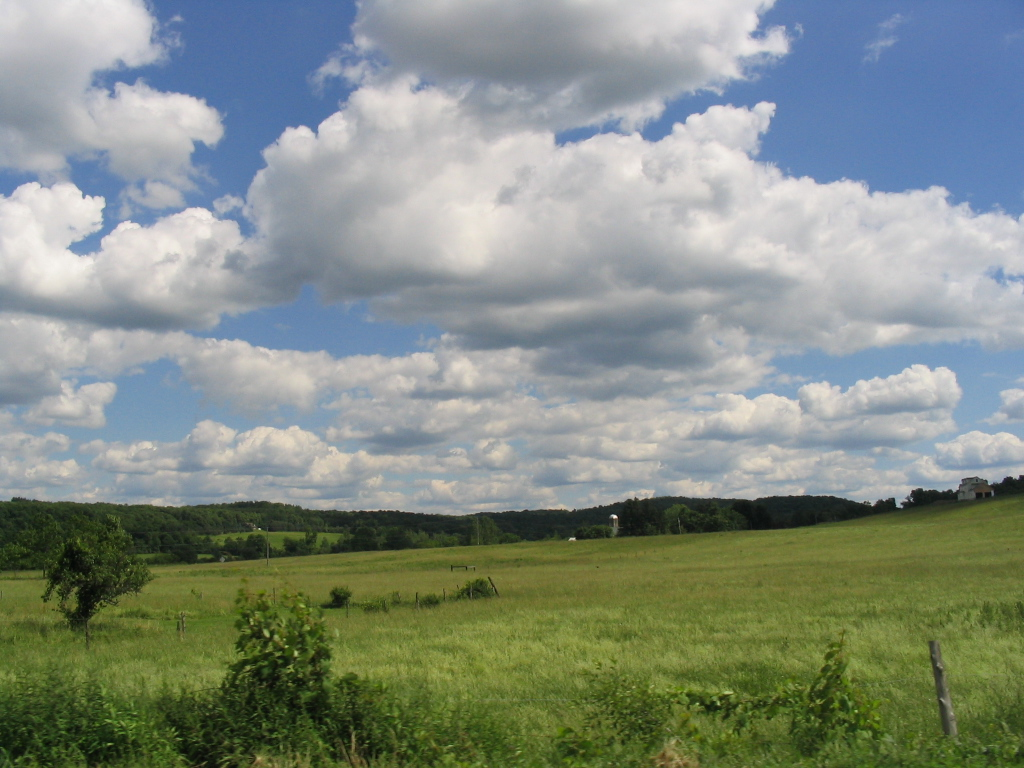
The rolling hills of Pompey are located just southeast of Syracuse.

== Demographics ==
Historical population
Census	Pop.	Note	%±
1820	6,701		—
1830	4,812		−28.2%
1840	4,371		−9.2%
1850	4,006		−8.4%
1860	3,931		−1.9%
1870	3,314		−15.7%
1880	3,240		−2.2%
1890	2,859		−11.8%
1900	2,546		−10.9%
1910	2,093		−17.8%
1920	1,882		−10.1%
1930	1,996		6.1%
1940	2,099		5.2%
1950	2,531		20.6%
1960	3,469		37.1%
1970	4,536		30.8%
1980	4,492		−1.0%
1990	5,317		18.4%
2000	6,164		15.9%
2010	7,080		14.9%
2020	7,080		0.0%
U.S. Decennial Census

As of the census of 2000, there were 6,159 people, 2,154 households, and 1,761 families residing in the town. The population density was 92.7 inhabitants per square mile (35.8/km^{2}). There were 2,272 housing units at an average density of 34.2 per square mile (13.2/km^{2}). The racial makeup of the town was 97.56% White, 0.37% African American, 0.21% Native American, 0.96% Asian, 0.28% from other races, and 0.62% from two or more races. Hispanic or Latino of any race were 0.70% of the population.

There were 2,154 households, out of which 41.4% had children under the age of 18 living with them, 72.4% were married couples living together, 5.5% had a female householder with no husband present, and 18.2% were non-families. 14.7% of all households were made up of individuals, and 5.6% had someone living alone who was 65 years of age or older. The average household size was 2.86 and the average family size was 3.17.

In the town, the population was spread out, with 29.6% under the age of 18, 4.4% from 18 to 24, 27.8% from 25 to 44, 28.2% from 45 to 64, and 10.1% who were 65 years of age or older. The median age was 39 years. For every 100 females, there were 99.4 males. For every 100 females age 18 and over, there were 98.2 males.

The median income for a household in the town was $59,190, and the median income for a family was $64,442. Males had a median income of $42,212 versus $32,357 for females. The per capita income for the town was $27,970. About 2.5% of families and 3.9% of the population were below the poverty line, including 5.4% of those under the age 18 and 2.2% of those ages 65 or over.

== Notable people ==
- William Barnes Sr. (1824 – 1913), attorney and author
- Victory Birdseye (1782 – 1853), lawyer, postmaster and congressman
- Jason W. Briggs (1821 – 1899), leader in the early history of the Latter Day Saint movement
- John D. Candee (1819 – 1888), newspaper editor and politician
- William George Fargo (1818 – 1881), founder of Wells-Fargo and mayor of Buffalo, New York
- Frank Hiscock (1834 – 1914), member of the United States Congress
- L. Harris Hiscock (1824 – 1867), brother of Frank Hiscock; New York State Assembly member and Onondaga County Surrogate Court judge
- Leonard Jerome (1817 – 1891), stock broker and investment banker; maternal grandfather of British Prime Minister Winston Churchill
- Sara Jane Clarke Lippincott (1823 – 1904), publisher of Little Pilgrim and the first woman journalist employed by the New York Times
- Charles Mason (1804 – 1882), chief justice of Iowa (1838–1842) and U.S. commissioner of patents (1853–1857).
- Erastus Dow Palmer (1817 – 1904), sculptor
- Charles B. Sedgwick (1815 – 1883), U.S. congressman (1859–1863)
- Horatio Seymour (1810 – 1886), two-time governor of New York
- Silas J. Seymour (1824 – 1899), member of the Wisconsin State Assembly
- James Shanahan (1920 – 1997), Brigadier General with distinguished combat service and numerous awards
- Henry Warner Slocum (1827 – 1894), general for the Union during the Civil War and U.S. Congressman from Brooklyn
- John Edison Sweet (1832 – 1916), engineer and professor at Cornell University, and a Dean at Syracuse University. His brother Homer Sweet, a poet and surveyor, wrote the New Atlas of Onondaga County, NY, in 1874, still used by local historians. Brother William Avery Sweet was a manufacturer of steel and refined technology.
- Theodore Weld (1802 – 1895), leading abolitionist
- Charles Augustus Wheaton (1809 – 1882), major abolitionist and supporter of the Underground Railroad

== Education ==
=== School districts ===
The town of Pompey covers part of four separate public school districts:

- Fabius-Pompey Central School District
- Fayetteville-Manlius Central School District
- Jamesville-Dewitt Central School District
- Cazenovia Central School District

== Communities and locations in the Town of Pompey ==
- Atwell Corners – A location on the eastern town line near Hills Corners.
- Berwyn – A location southwest of Pompey hamlet and west of Swift Corner.
- Buellville – A hamlet at the northern town line on NY 92.
- Clough Corners – A hamlet southeast of Pompey hamlet.
- Delphi Falls – A hamlet near the eastern town boundary.
- Hills Corners – A location near the east town line on US 20, east of Pompey Center.
- Jamesville Reservoir – A reservoir in the northwestern corner of Pompey.
- Jamesville Beach County Park – A county park south of Jamesville Reservoir.
- Jerome Corner – A hamlet south of Pompey hamlet, near the southern town line on NY 91.
- Oran – A hamlet in the northeastern corner of the town on NY 92, southeast of Beullville.
- Pompey – A hamlet in the western part of the town at US 20 and NY 91.
- Pompey Center – A hamlet east of Pompey hamlet on US 20. The Pompey Centre District No. 10 Schoolhouse was listed on the National Register of Historic Places in 1998.
- Pompey Hill – A famous elevation (1728') in the town that allows a view of seven counties.
- Pompey Hollow – A valley near the eastern town line.
- Pratt's Falls County Park – A county park northeast of Pompey hamlet.
- Salem Corner – A hamlet northeast of Pompey hamlet.
- Stebbins Gulf – A valley in the western part of Pompey, north of The Tunnel.
- Swift Corner – A hamlet south of Pompey hamlet and west of Jerome Corner.
- The Tunnel – A valley in the western part of the town.
- Watervale – A hamlet northeast of Pompey hamlet and west of Salem Corner.
