= Candee =

Candee is a surname. Notable people with the surname include:

- Helen Churchill Candee (1858–1949), American author, journalist, interior decorator, and feminist
- John Dutton Candee (1819–1888), American newspaper editor and politician
- Leverett Candee (1795–1863), American industrialist and businessman
