= Delphi Falls (waterfall) =

Waterfall in Madison County, New York, US

Coordinates: 42°51′50″N 75°53′57″W

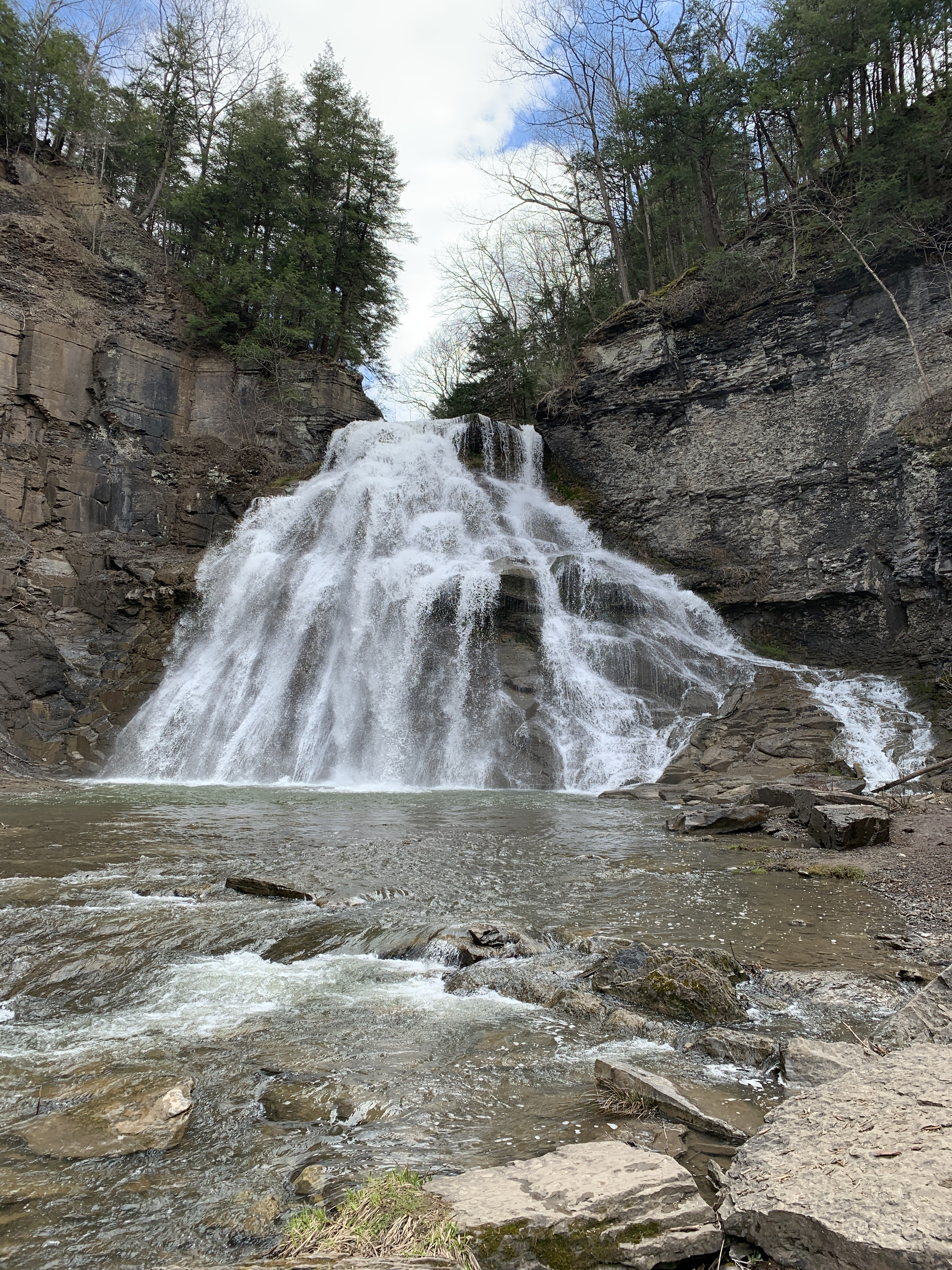
The lower tier of Delphi Falls in spring 2020

Delphi Falls is a two-tiered waterfall located in the 66-acre (27 ha) Delphi Falls County Park on Limestone Creek southeast of the hamlet of Delphi Falls. The lower falls are 62 feet (19 m) tall, while the upper are 54 feet (16 m).

The land, which was a tourist attraction in the early 20th century, was privately owned and closed to public access as early as the 1950s until 2018, when it was purchased and turned into a county park.

== History ==
In the early 20th century, the land surrounding Delphi Falls was a tourist attraction and site for picnicking. In 1901, the Syracuse Post-Standard reported that a proposed extension of the Syracuse and Suburban Railroad would extend to the base of the lower waterfall, with power to be generated from a hydroelectric plant fed by water dammed above the waterfalls. Around the middle of the century, the land, which was privately owned, was closed to public access.

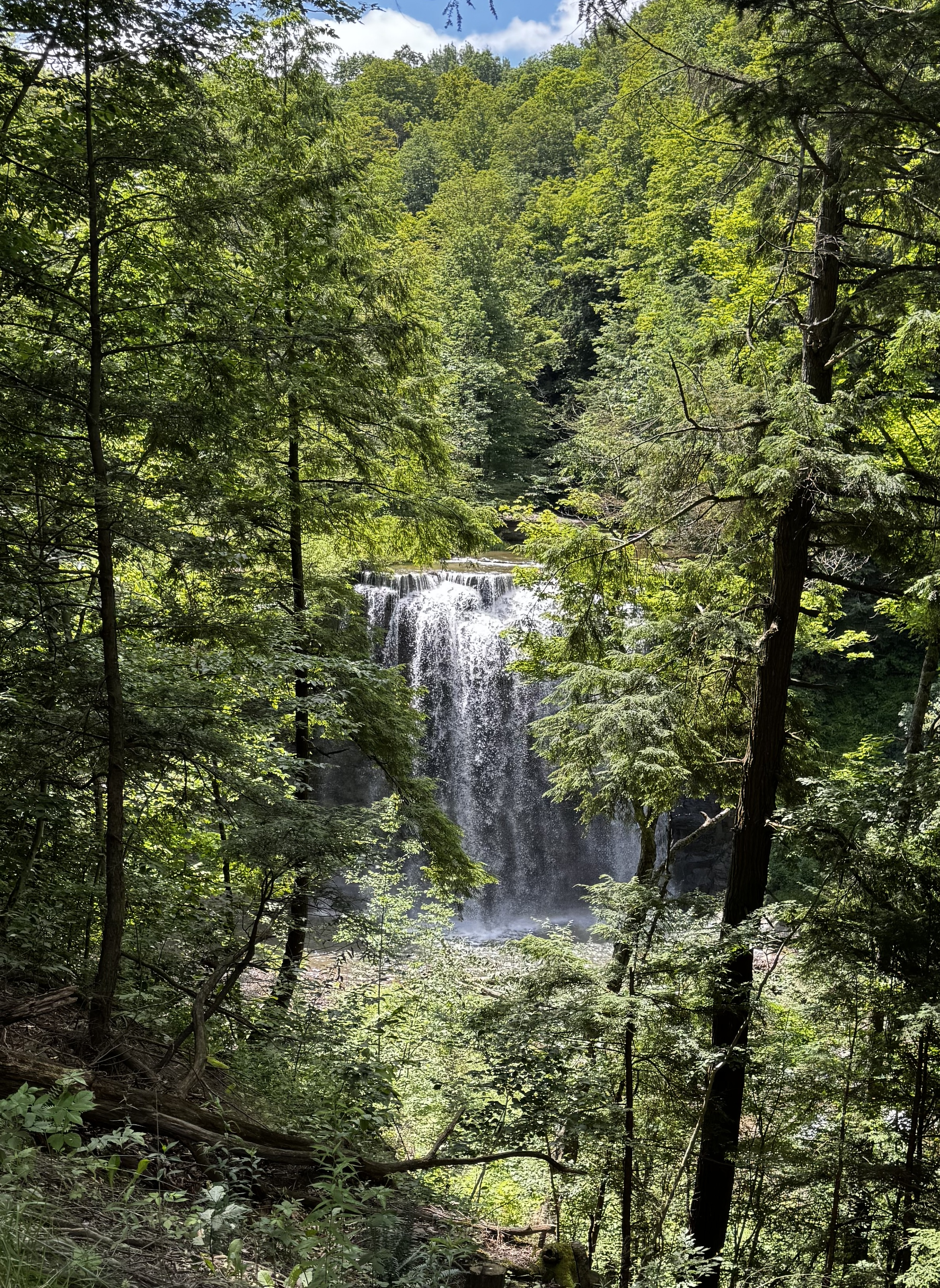
The upper tier waterfall in June 2025

The land was purchased and opened to the public in 2018, with contributions from a retired professor at Syracuse University who lived in Manlius, New York, (contribution of $750,000) and the Madison County government (contribution of $150,000).

Delphi Falls County Park was developed and opened in August 2018. That year, Madison County was awarded a $500,000 grant for park improvements. The park was closed for a week in July 2020 after repeated violations of park rules.

In July 2022 a two-phase program of improvements was announced, initially scheduled to be completed by October that year. It included the construction of a new parking lot, a new bridge below the falls, and further trail development. The cost was estimated at $1.3 million, including $1 million of state grants. The park fully reopened in June 2025 after work was completed.

== See also ==
- List of waterfalls
