= Oran, New York =

Oran
- hamlet
- Location within the state of New York
- Coordinates: 42°58′41″N 75°55′59″W
- Country: United States
- State: New York
- County: Onondaga
- Time zone: UTC-5 (Eastern (EST))
  - Summer (DST): UTC-4 (EDT)

Oran is a hamlet within the Town of Pompey in Onondaga County, New York, United States. It is located along Cazenovia Road, a section of New York State Route 92, between the villages of Manlius and Cazenovia.

The Oran District No. 22 Schoolhouse and Drover's Tavern are listed on the National Register of Historic Places.

An early settler, George Clark, was the first merchant and the first teacher of Oran.
