= Silas J. Seymour =

American politician

Silas J. Seymour (February 21, 1824 – April 24, 1899) was a member of the Wisconsin State Assembly in the USA

== Biography ==
Seymour was born on February 21, 1824, in Pompey, New York. He settled in Dellona, Wisconsin, in 1849. On September 23, 1851, Seymour married Mary A. Conine. They had five children. He died on April 24, 1899, at the age of 75.

== Career ==
Seymour had been an unsuccessful candidate for the Assembly in 1861. He was elected to the Assembly from 1876 to 1887. Other positions he held include Town Clerk, Town Superintendent of Schools and Chairman of the Town Board of Supervisors of Dellona; County Supervisor of Sauk County, Wisconsin, and justice of the peace. He was a Republican.
