= Delphi Baptist Church =

Historic church in New York, United States

- U.S. National Register of Historic Places
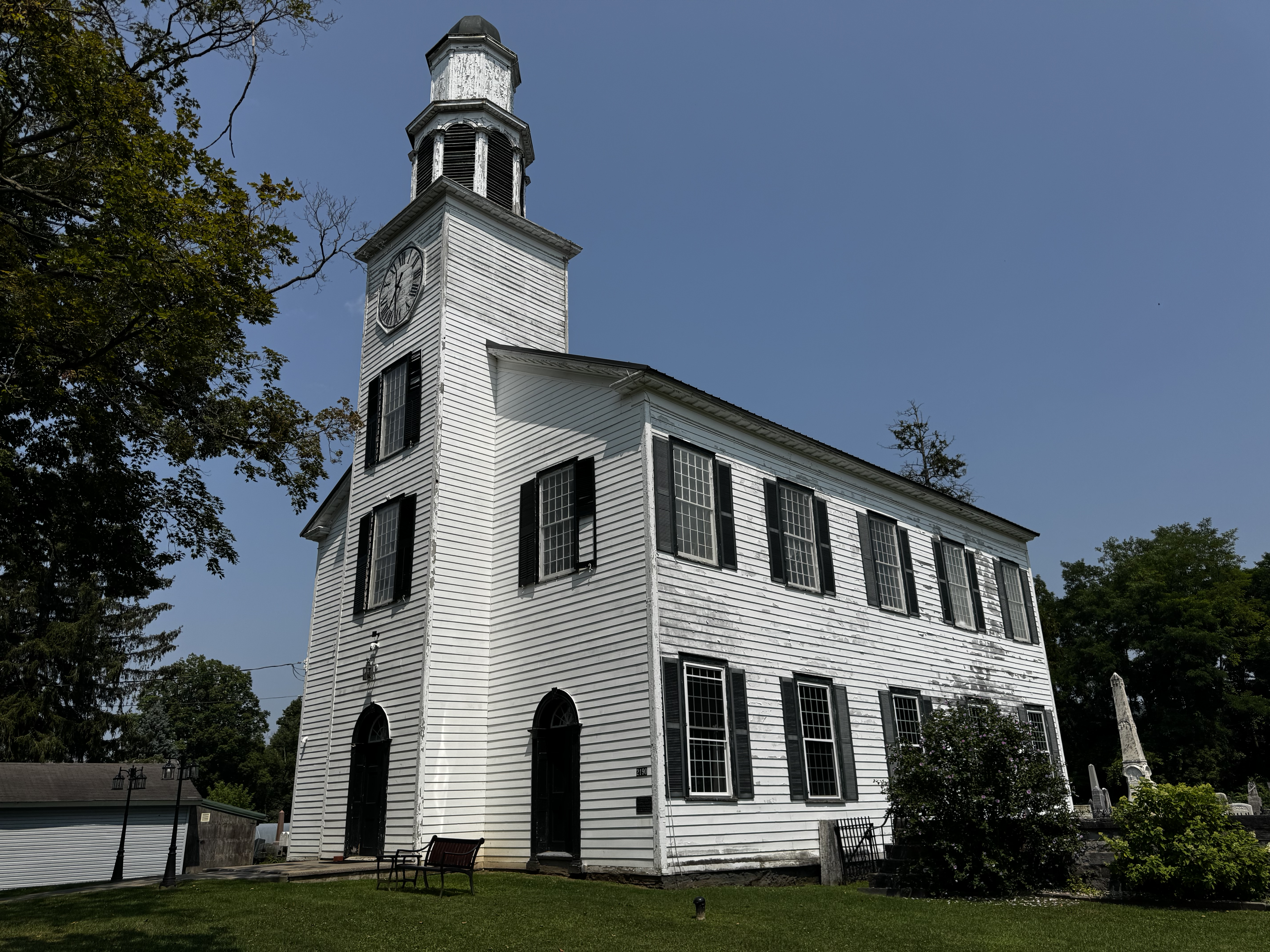
- Church in August 2025

- Location within New York Location within the United States
- Location: Oran-Delphi Rd., Delphi Falls, New York
- Coordinates: 42°52′38″N 75°54′48″W
- Area: 1 acre (0.40 ha)
- Built: 1815
- NRHP reference No.: 79001610
- Added to NRHP: August 24, 1979

The Delphi Baptist Church, also known as Delphi Falls United Church, is a historic Baptist church located at Delphi Falls, New York, Onondaga County, New York. It was built in 1815 and is the only surviving nearly-original church in Onondaga County surviving from the Federal period. A very large, old, and well-lit church, it features large "twenty over twenty sash windows", consisting of 20 glass panes in each of upper and lower sashes.

It listed on the National Register of Historic Places on August 24, 1979.

== Gallery ==
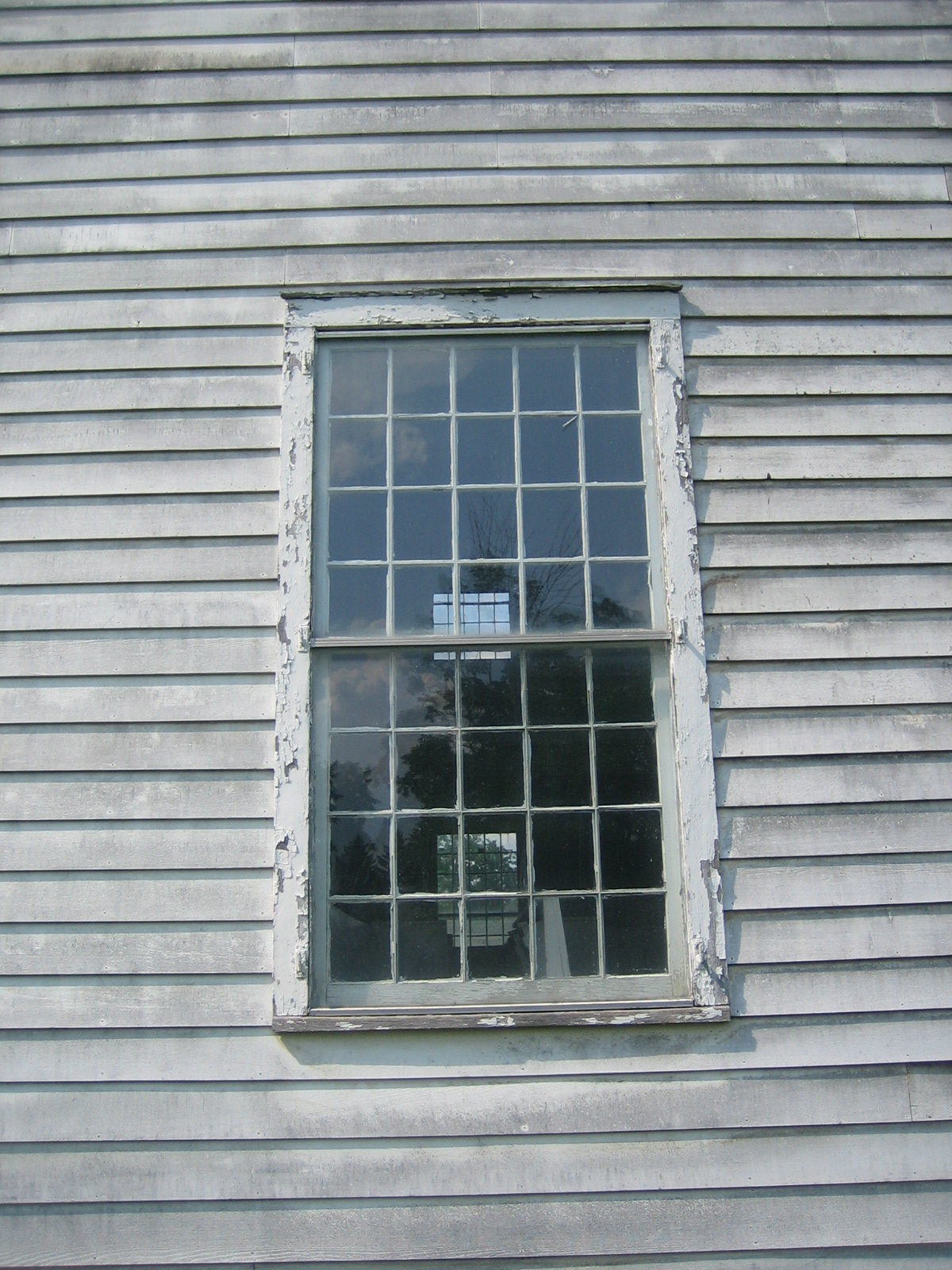
A 20 over 20 sash window

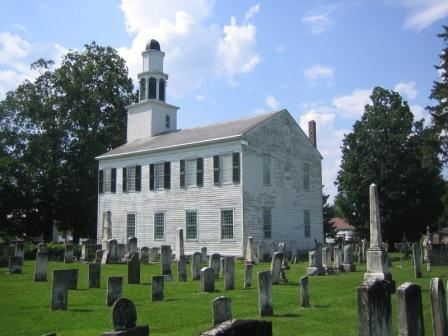
Church view

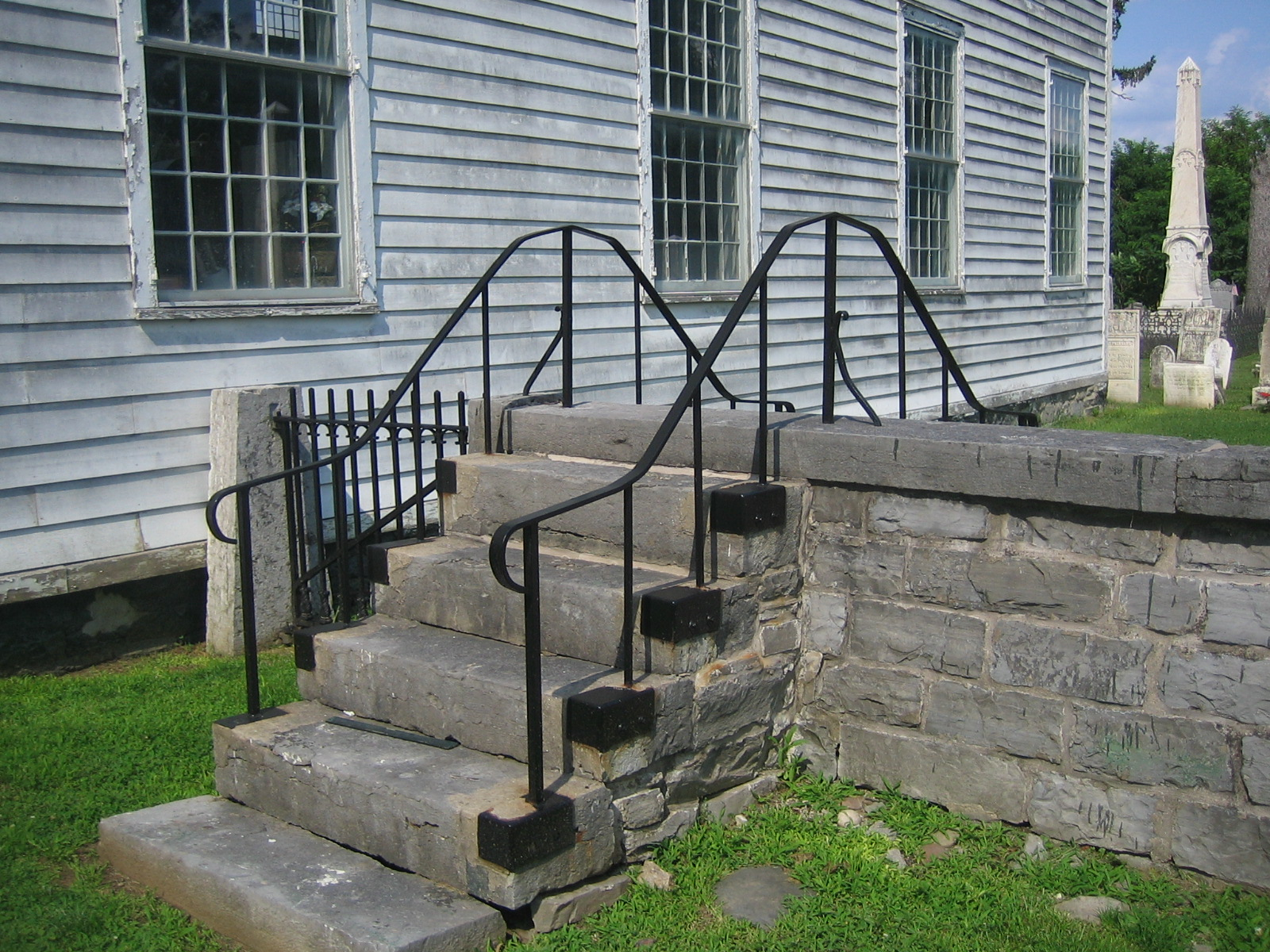
Stone steps over cemetery wall, with iron railing
