= DeRuyter Reservoir =

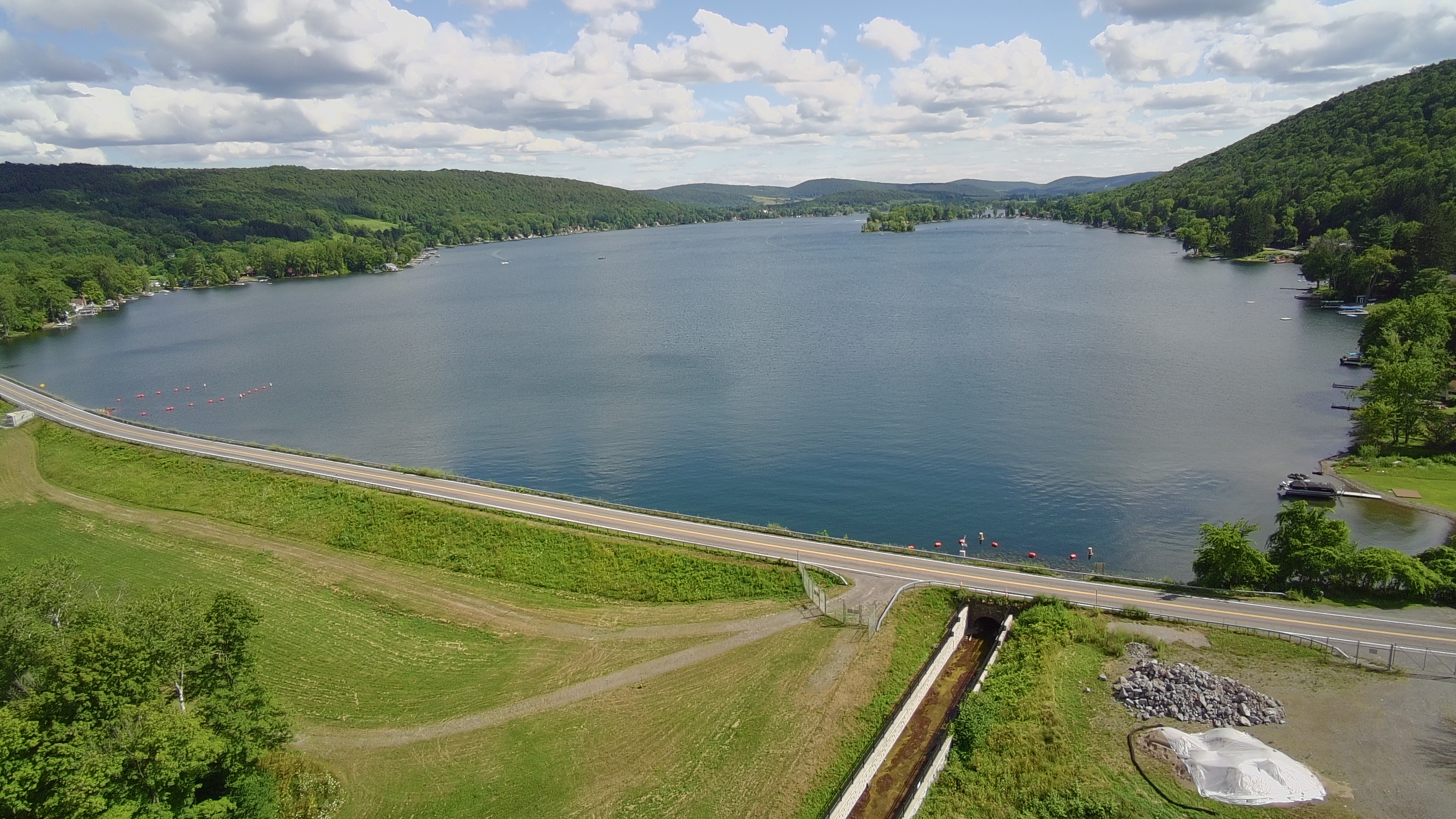
- The Reservoir from the end of the dam.

- Location within New York Location within the United States
- Location: Madison County, Onondaga County, New York, United States
- Coordinates: 42°48′53″N 75°53′27″W
- Type: Reservoir
- Primary inflows: Mill Brook
- Primary outflows: Limestone Creek
- Basin countries: United States
- Surface area: 576 acres (2.33 km^{2})
- Average depth: 15 feet (4.6 m)
- Max. depth: 53 ft (16 m)
- Shore length^{1}: 5.8 miles (9.3 km)
- Surface elevation: 1,280 ft (390 m)
- Islands: 2
- Settlements: Puckerville, New York
- ^{1} Shore length is not a well-defined measure.

DeRuyter Reservoir (also known as Tioughnioga Lake) is a man-made lake located north of DeRuyter, New York. There is access by fee on the south shore at the general store. The reservoir was constructed from 1861 to 1863 to supply water for the Erie Canal.

Throughout the 20th century, as New York stopped using the reservoir for the canal, DeRuyter became a popular site for recreation and cottages were built around the reservoir. In the 1960s, a dispute began between the state, which technically owned the shoreline, and owners of homes on the lake, many of whom did not have legal title to portions of the land that they occupied. The issue was not resolved until 1981, when legislation was passed by which the state could sell the land to its occupants.

Today, DeRuyter Reservoir is used for recreational activities including boating and fishing. Its outflow feeds Limestone Creek.

== Geography ==
DeRuyter is located in Madison County, near the towns of Fabius, DeRuyter, and Cazenovia. The lake is bordered on the other sides by forested ridges; DeRuyter State Forest to the east, and Highland Forest to the west. The North Country Trail (following the Finger Lakes Trail) passes through these forests, and across the reservoir dam.

The DeRuyter Reservoir dam is up to 70 feet (21 m) high and 1,500 feet (460 m) wide. In 1899, it was reported that the reservoir had had a capacity of 500,000,000 cubic feet (14,000,000 m^{3}). According to New York state, the reservoir has 557 acres (2.25 km^{2}) of surface area, 6.2 miles (10.0 km) of shoreline, and is 1.8 miles (2.9 km) long with a maximum depth of 55 feet (17 m).

Water flows into DeRuyter directly from a watershed of 2,722 acres (1,102 ha) which includes several artesian springs at its south end. This watershed is primarily forested (60%) or agricultural (23%) land. To the north, the reservoir's outflow forms Limestone Creek's eastern branch. In periods of low water, water from the Tioughnioga River can be routed into it, though this has not occurred since 1993. When this diversion is made, it increases the lake's watershed by 14 square miles (36 km^{2}).

== History ==
=== Dam ===
In the 19th century, New York State constructed a system of reservoirs and feeder canals along the path of the Erie Canal, in an attempt to ensure that the canal had a stable supply of water.

In 1856, an estimate for a reservoir on Limestone Creek put the cost at $118,367.55. Construction of the reservoir was authorized by the Canal Board in January 1861, and it was opened in 1863. Charles A. Beach was in charge of initial construction. The upper Tioughnioga River was diverted into the reservoir. The initial purpose was to provide additional water to the Erie Canal during the dry season. In 1862, the reservoir was "brought into use, though not completed". It was completed the following year, at a total cost of $126,026.82.

Located at the headwaters of Limestone Creek, the reservoir could provide an additional 4,000 cubic feet (110 m^{3}) per minute to the canal, for 100 days. Though DeRuyter Reservoir was supposed to ensure the canal remained navigable between "Lock No. 39 and a point nine miles west of Higginsville, New York", the reservoir had proved insufficient by 1864, and it was suggested that a feeder canal be constructed at Fish Creek. Three years later, the reservoir was deemed 'entirely inadequate' to supply the canal.

The DeRuyter dam has seen major renovations at least twice: in 1950 and 2019-2020. In the summer of 1950, the reservoir was drained to facilitate repairs costing around $100,000. That year, The Post-Standard reported that the dam had become "saturated by leaks". Another renovation program was announced by the New York State Canal Corporation in 2019. To facilitate this project, DeRuyter was set to be drained around 10 feet (3.0 m) The project was undertaken by Wesson Group and completed by the end of 2020.

=== Development ===
After the state ceased using water from DeRuyter and other reservoirs to feed the Erie Canal, it largely abandoned control over the reservoir, but continued to technically own the land surrounding the reservoir up to a "blue line", or high water boundary. DeRuyter gradually became a popular vacation site. The Ithaca and Cortland area YMCAs operated a summer camp, known as Camp Crone, on the reservoir as early as 1921, though they did not formally purchase land until 1925. The camp closed in 1948, and merged operations with another nearby YMCA camp.

In the mid-20th century, New York resurveyed the reservoir and formally marked the blue line. The state determined that "half or more" of the camps on the reservoir impeded on what was technically state-owned property, an issue faced by residents on other reservoirs in the region as well. Some landowners formally rented the state's land, while others paid nothing for it. The state began considering legislation to resolve the issue, including bills which would allow the residents to purchase the land from the state. A bill that aimed to do this was vetoed in 1961. In 1963, a conference was held in Albany on the issue. Another bill was considered by the assembly in 1964, but legislation was not successfully passed until 1981. The 1981 law gave residents with infringing properties a decade to decide whether they would formally purchase the land from the state; the price for DeRuyter land was set at 32 cents per 1 square foot (0.093 m^{2}). If they opted against making the purchase, the land could be sold to anyone.

In 1995, the town of Fabius and village of DeRuyter purchased 1.92 acres (0.78 ha) of land on the reservoir from the state, where they ran public swimming lessons. They opted against opening the area to broader public use due to limited parking and concerns that the road it was located on could not handle increased traffic.

== Water quality ==
In 1998, New York State listed DeRuyter Reservoir on its 303(d) list because poor water quality impaired the health of aquatic life and the safety of using the lake for recreation. This was largely due to an excess of phosphorus in the water. In response, the Madison County Planning Department and Soil and Water Conservation District began working to control erosion on inflows to the lake, and worked with local farms to limit nutrient runoff. Other projects were aimed at upgrading residential sewage systems. By 2008, the state determined that phosphorus quantities had been reduced to safe levels.

As part of the Citizens Statewide Lake Assessment Program (CSLAP), volunteers monitored the water quality at DeRuyter from 1988 to 2010, and again from 2012 to 2025. The 2022 CSLAP report reported moderate water clarity, moderate algae levels, and moderate phosphorus levels, as well as "slightly alkaline or basic [water], with intermediate hardness water, low water color, and low nitrogen levels." The lake experiences frequent harmful algae blooms.

== Ecology ==
Several invasive species have been reported in DeRuyter, including zebra mussels, Eurasian water milfoil, and the banded mystery snail.

=== Fishing ===
Fish species present in the lake include smallmouth bass, pickerel, yellow perch, rock bass, black bullhead, common sunfish, and walleye. The New York State Department of Environmental Conservation stocks the reservoir with walleye, and has done so from 1935 to 1990, from 2001 to 2012, and again since 2021. Between 2013 and 2019, the DeRuyter Reservoir Association stocked walleye.

In the winter, the lake is a popular site for ice fishing.
