= Pompey Center, New York =

Hamlet in New York, US

Pompey Center
- hamlet
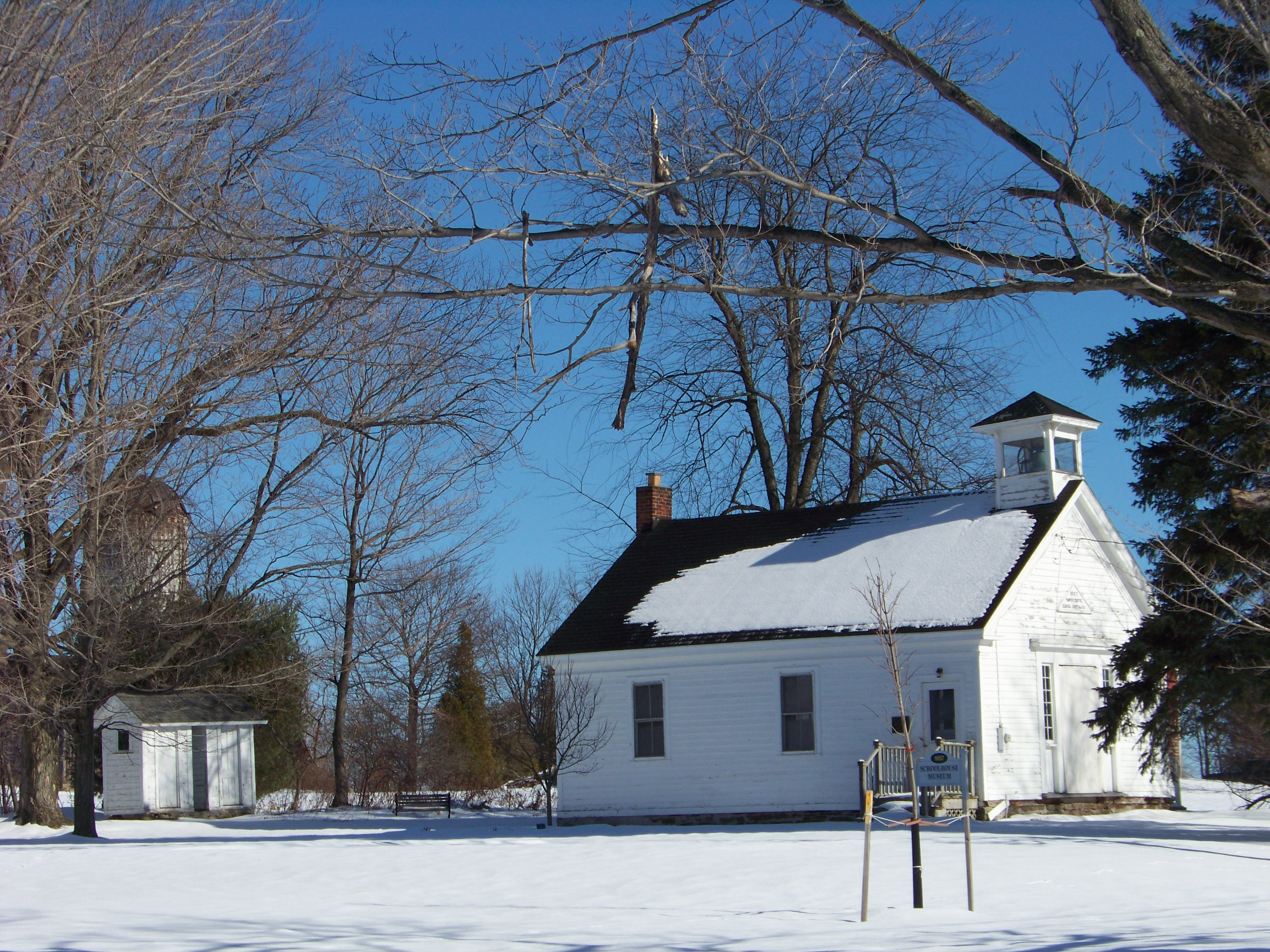
- Pompey Centre District No. 10 Schoolhouse

- Location within the state of New York
- Coordinates: 42°55′23″N 75°57′02″W
- Country: United States
- State: New York
- County: Onondaga
- Elevation: 1,237 ft (377 m)
- Time zone: UTC-5 (Eastern (EST))
  - Summer (DST): UTC-4 (EDT)
- GNIS feature ID: 960878

Pompey Center is a hamlet in the town of Pompey in Onondaga County, New York, United States. It is the location of Pompey Centre District No. 10 Schoolhouse, a historic one-room schoolhouse listed on the U.S. National Register of Historic Places.
