= Highland Forest =

County park of Onondaga County, New York

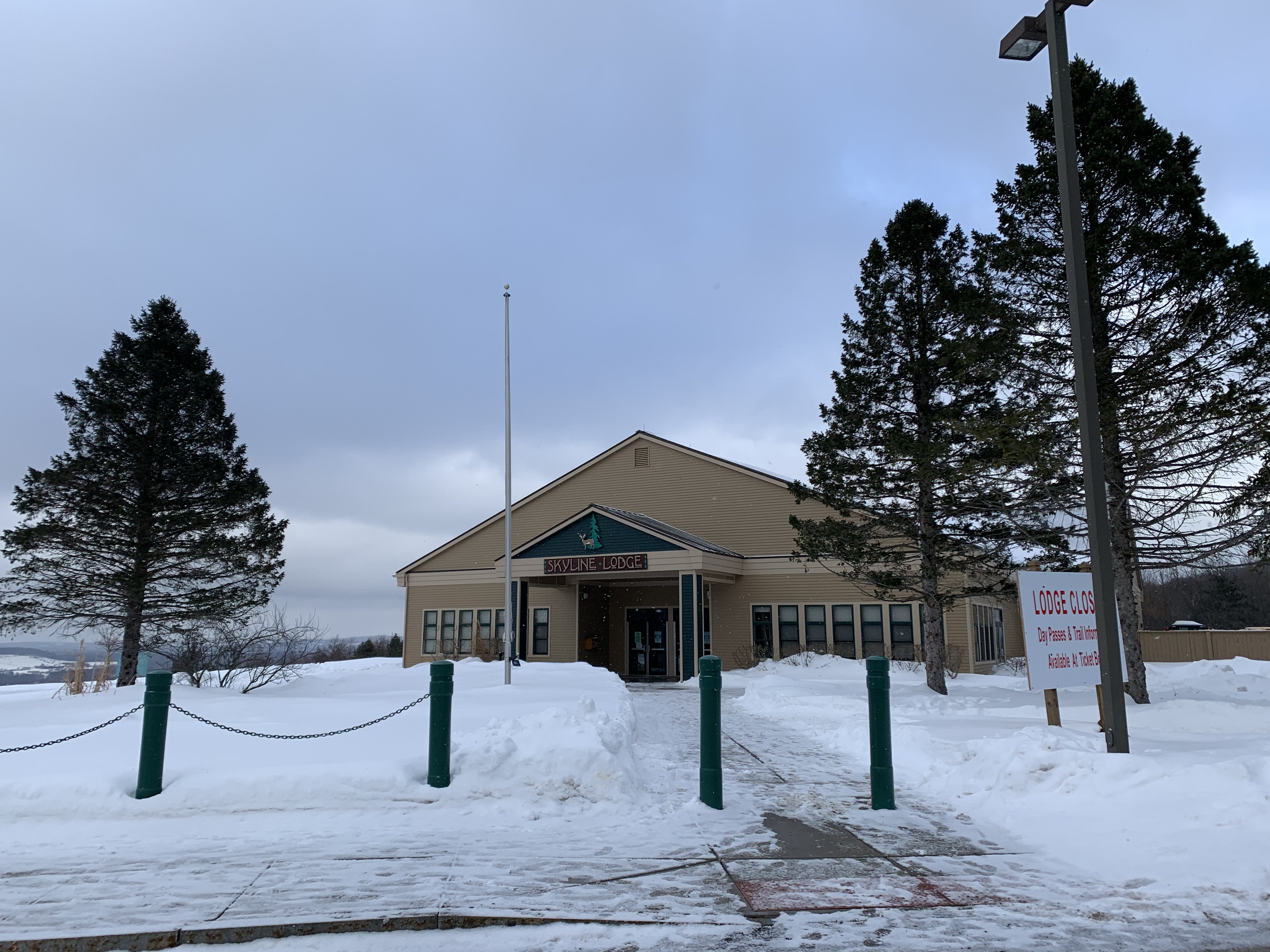
- The Skyline Lodge at Highland Forest (2021)
- Interactive map of Highland Forest
- Type: Public Park
- Location: Fabius, New York
- Coordinates: 42.84531°N 75.92412°W
- Operator: Onondaga County Parks
- Open: All year.
- Website: http://www.onondagacountyparks.com/parks/highland-forest

Highland Forest is a county park in Fabius, Onondaga County, New York. Founded in 1930, it is the oldest county park in Onondaga County. The park has more than 20 miles (32 km) of trails across 2,759 acres of forest, including trails for horseback riding, cross-country skiing, mountain biking, and hiking.

By the late 1920s, most of the land that became Highland Forest had been cleared for farming and then abandoned. Parcels was purchased by Onondaga County beginning in the 1930s and systematically reforested. The park has been periodically renovated in the decades that followed: cross-country skiing trails were developed in the 1970s, and a new lodge was opened in 2003. Since the 1950s, the park has also held a museum of local history.

== Geography ==
Highland Forest is centered on Arab Hill, and its elevation is largely between 1,550–1,900 feet (470–580 m) above sea level, averaging out to around 1,700 feet (520 m). The North Country Trail (following the Finger Lakes Trail) passes through the park, going by DeRuyter Reservoir to the east, and Morgan Hill State Forest to the west.

The park comprises 2,759 acres of land, which is primarily forested.

== History ==
The region was first settled by Europeans as early as 1795, when farmers who cleared the land. At some point there was a community known as Kenyon Hollow, with around 20 farms or homes, a cemetery, a school, a mill, and a cheese factory. The land proved hard to farm, and by the late 1920s it was largely abandoned.

=== Foundation ===
The Onondaga County Parks system itself was founded on September 6, 1927. Highland Forest Park was one of the County's first parks. Two years after the system had been established, in 1929, the New York State Legislature passed legislation that offered funding to counties that undertook the reforestation of abandoned farmland. Two local foresters, Nelson C. Brown and F. Franklin Moon, encouraged the county to take advantage of the legislation. The county board of supervisors agreed to spend $5,000 doing so on June 3, 1929. Beginning in 1930, the county began purchasing farms around Fabius, New York, acquiring the land that became Highland Forest. By the end of the decade, they had acquired 2,000 acres. Most of the farmhouses on the land were burned or otherwise destroyed.

From 1930 to 1939, Onondaga County planted around 2 million trees on this land. The trees, which included pines, cedars, spruce, larch, and hardwood, were provided by the New York State Department of Environmental Conservation. The park system also gradually worked to develop the land as a park, carving trails and placing fireplaces and picnic tables beginning in 1932. That year work also began to redevelop a farmhouse into a "community house" that could be used for hosting events, funded by the Civil Works Administration. In 1938, the county began charging $1 to rent the building.

By 1939, the park had an estimated 35,000 annual visitors, and facilities including courts for playing horseshoes, shuffleboard, checkerboard, table tennis, and croquet.

=== Later development ===
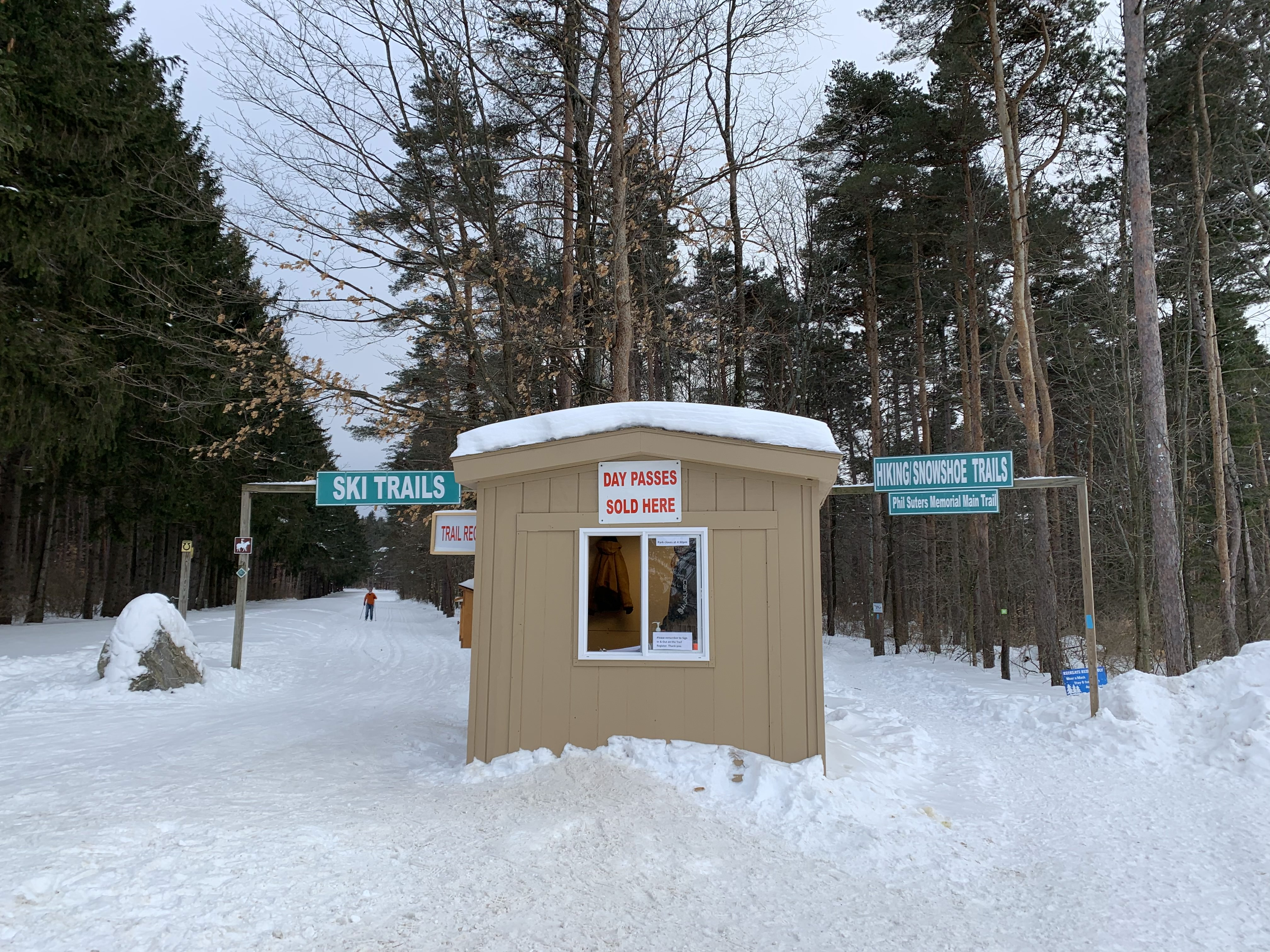
Cross-country skiing and hiking trailheads

During the Second World War, Syracuse China tested prototypes of ceramic land mines at the park.

Development of cross-country skiing trails at Highland Forest began in 1976. In 1989, the magazine Cross Country Ski ranked the trails second in New York State. Three years later, the county began offering ski rentals. The county began grooming some of these trails in 2006.

At the turn of the century, the park had an estimated 100,000 yearly visitors. In 2000, the county approved funds to build a new lodge at the park, named the "Skyline Lodge". Construction on the lodge took place from mid-2002 to 2003, and cost $2.5 million. The lodge was opened in late 2003. It has 10,000 square feet (930 m^{2}) of space, including restrooms, a kitchen, offices, and rooms with a capacity of 160.

== Pioneer Museum ==
Beginning in the 1950s, Highland Forest County Park hosted a museum about the history of the region, known as the "Pioneer Museum". Ray Benson, who worked for the park as a forester, built a small building and collected items for it. The museum was renovated in the late 1980s, and re-opened in 1990. By this point, the museum had expanded to hold around 5,000 items. It was closed by the county in 2003. Three years later, the Fabius Historical Society announced plans to re-open and renovate the museum.

As of 2025, the museum is open from June to August on weekends.

== Activities ==
The park has over 20 miles (32 km) of trails for hiking, horseback riding, mountain biking, and, in the winter, cross-country skiing. There is also a 300-foot (91 m) sledding hill.
