= Delphi Falls, New York =

Delphi Falls
- hamlet
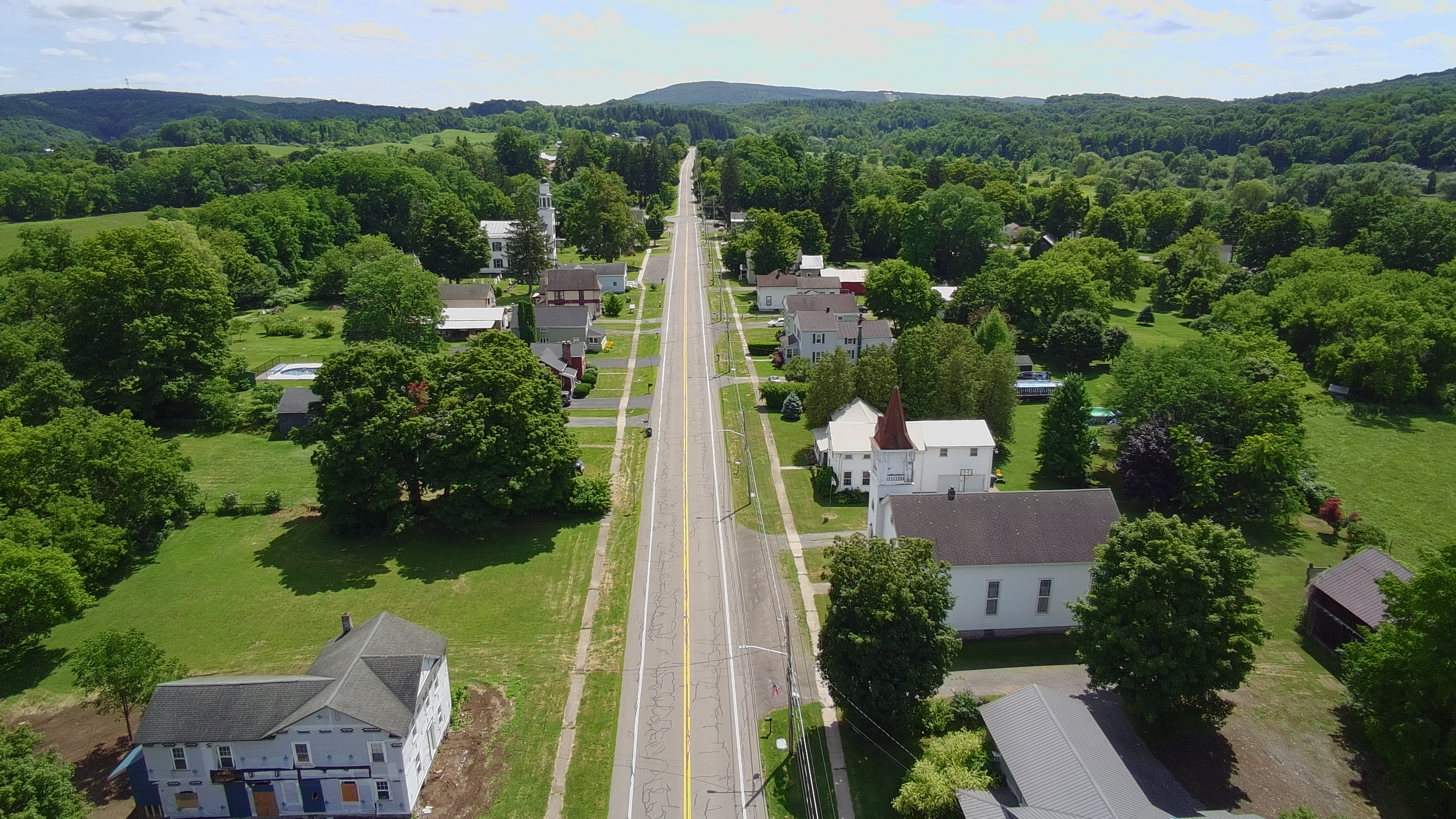
- An aerial view of the main street of Delphi Falls

- Location within the state of New York
- Coordinates: 42°52′35″N 75°54′49″W
- Country: United States
- State: New York
- County: Onondaga
- Elevation: 948 ft (289 m)

Population (2010)
  - Total: 153
- Time zone: UTC-5 (Eastern (EST))
  - Summer (DST): UTC-4 (EDT)
- zip codes: 13051
- Area code: 315
- GNIS feature ID: 970067

Delphi Falls is a hamlet in the town of Pompey, New York, United States. There is a current population of 992. It was a prosperous town in the early 19th century. Businesses included a cheese factory, an evaporated milk production facility and a tannery.

Union Major General Henry Warner Slocum (1827–1894), an 1852 graduate of the United States Military Academy, and Civil War corps commander, was born near Delphi Falls. Delphi Falls is located southeast of the hamlet. One actually has to cross over into Madison County. Delphi is rich in small water falls dotting the western side of the valley.

Near the town is a waterfall, also named Delphi Falls.

== See also ==
- Delphi Baptist Church
