= Pratt's Falls Park =

County park in Pompey, New York

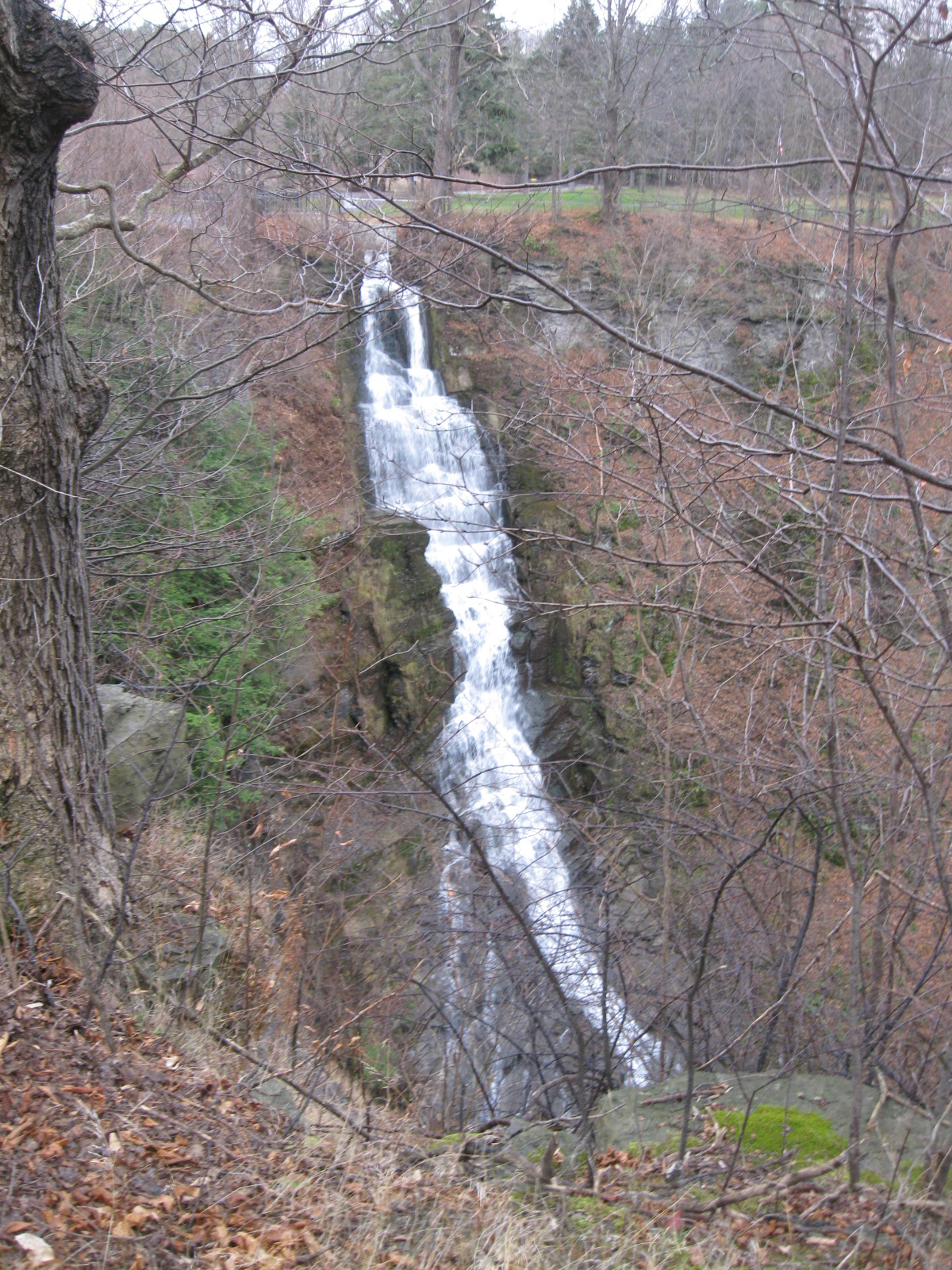
- Pratt's Falls
- Interactive map of Pratt's Falls Park
- Type: Public Park
- Location: 7671 Pratt's Falls Road, Manlius, NY 13104
- Coordinates: 42.92719°N 75.99466°W
- Operator: Onondaga County Parks
- Open: April through October
- Website: www.onondagacountyparks.com/parks/pratts-falls-park/

Pratt's Falls Park is a county park in Pompey, New York, United States. This park officially opened to the public on July 3, 1934. It contains Pratt's Falls, a 137 ft (42 m) ribbon or cascade style waterfall, and various facilities and trails. Pratt's Falls park is part of the Onondaga County Parks system.

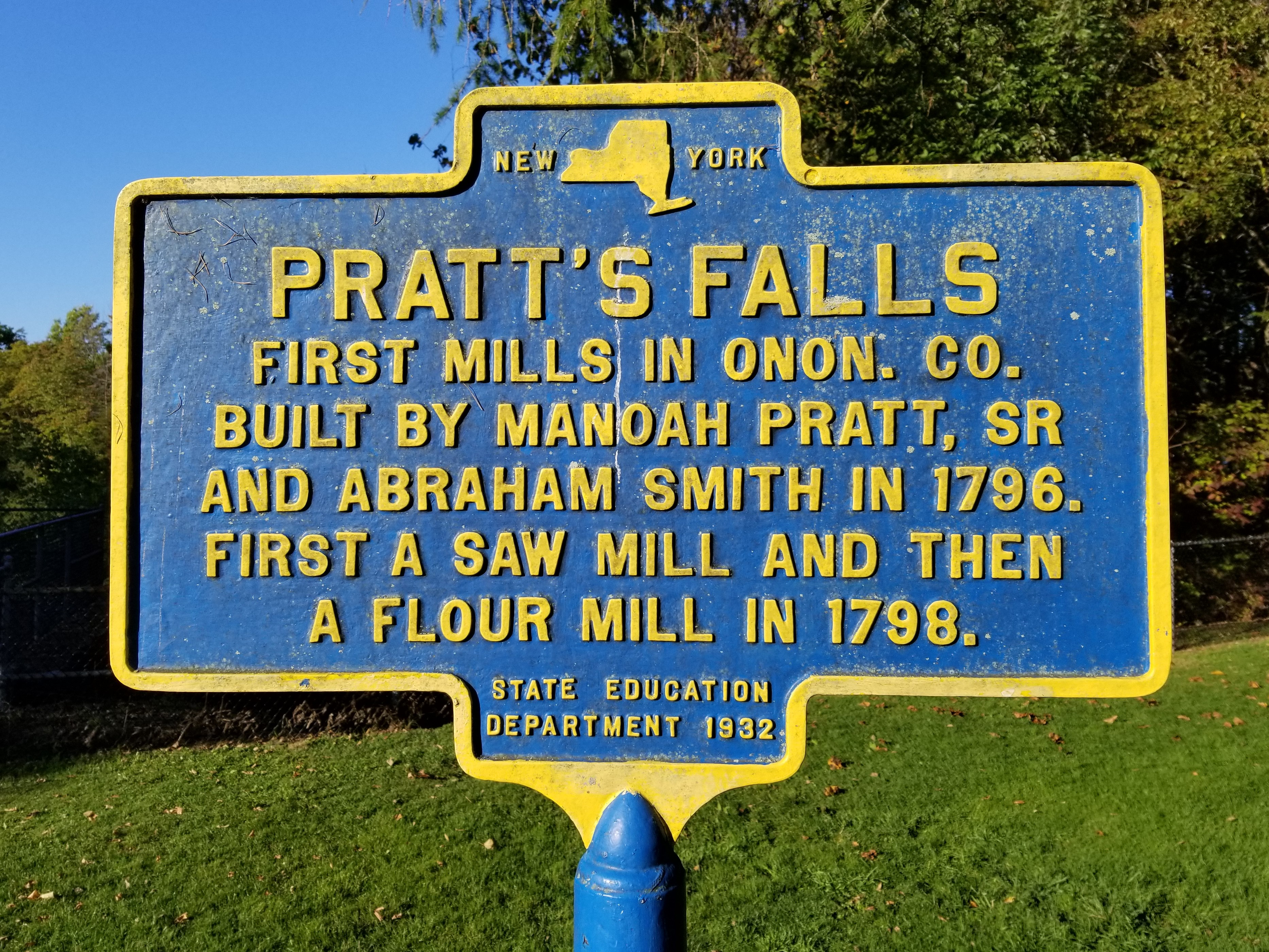
NYS historical marker, Pratt's Falls Park

== History ==
In 1796 this land housed one of Onondaga County's first mills. This saw mill, owned and operated by Manoah Pratt, Sr. and Abraham Smith formerly of Connecticut, ran until 1798 when it was turned into a flour mill. Pratts Falls and the surrounding acres were sold to Onondaga County by owner, Merritt Alonzo Hall, for $8,000 in 1913.

== Hiking trails ==
Pratt's Falls includes three main trails:

- North Rim Trail (2.6 miles) a wooded area trail which views an unnamed falls, crosses a stone footbridge and leads into a smaller gorge just below the park road. The trail passes the woods trail shelter.
- West Branch Trail (1.2 miles) is closest to the main entrance of the park.
- Falls Trail (0.6 miles) travels to a lower falls overlook above the gorge. This trail has several sets of stairs and travels by Camp Brockway and the Falls shelter.

== Facilities ==
Falls and Woods Trail shelters are covered shelters accommodating up to 100 people in and around each shelter.

Camp Brockway pavilion, located at the heart of the park and built in 1937, is a fully enclosed lodge with kitchen. This pavilion accommodates 180 seated guests or up to 400 people in area.

At the park main entrance there are two archery facilities spanning 28 yards (26 m) with six targets each. There is also a 1 mile (1.6 km) - 28 target course.

== Other activities ==
- Cross-country skiing, snowshoeing
- Geocaching
- Orienteering

== See also ==
- List of waterfalls
