= Pompey Centre District No. 10 Schoolhouse =

- U.S. National Register of Historic Places
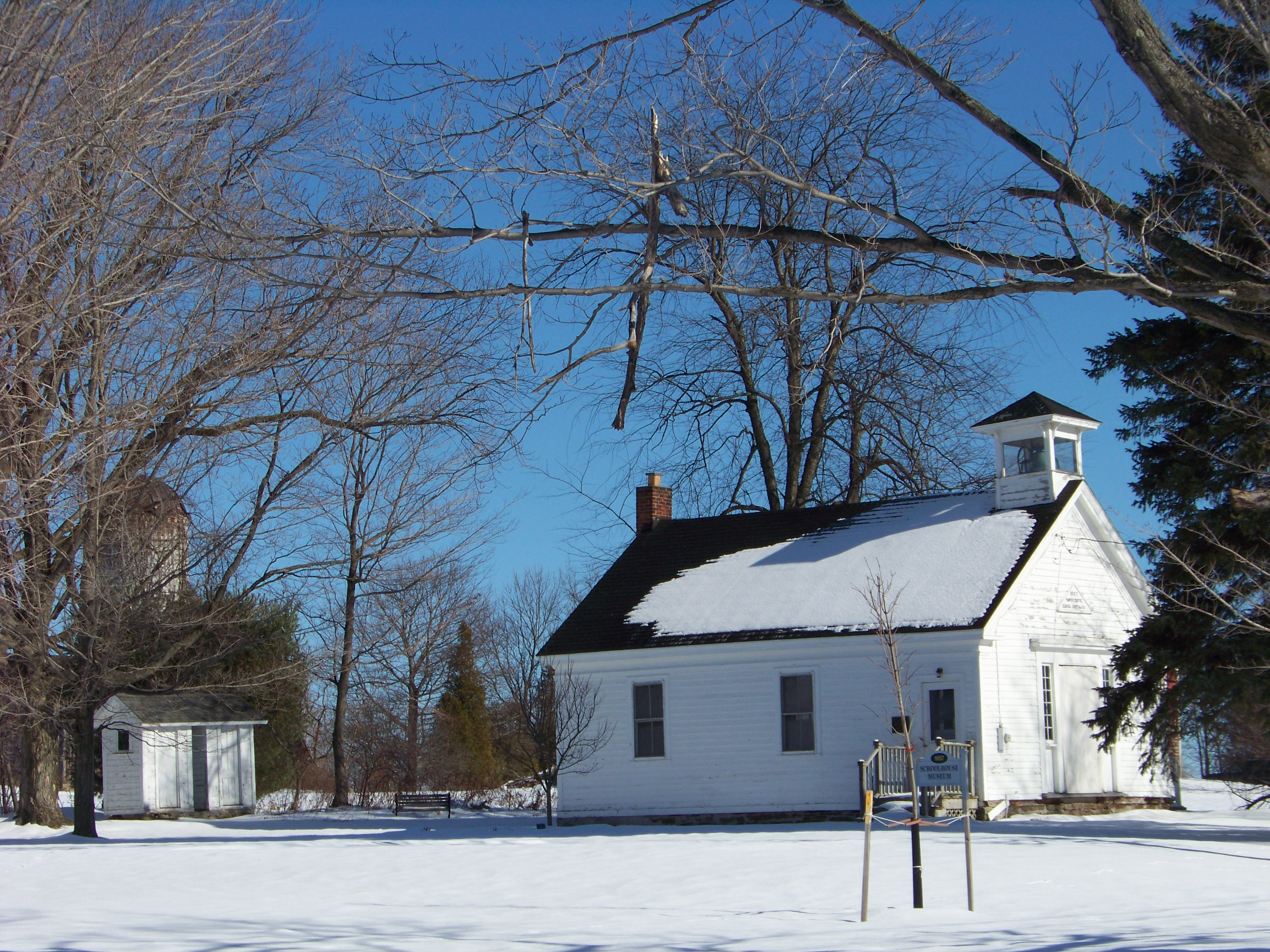

- Location within New York Location within the United States
- Location: 8354 US 20, Pompey Center, New York
- Coordinates: 42°55′25″N 75°56′58″W
- Area: 1 acre (0.40 ha)
- Built: 1857
- Architectural style: Greek Revival
- NRHP reference No.: 98001007
- Added to NRHP: August 6, 1998

Pompey Centre District No. 10 Schoolhouse is a historic one-room school building located at Pompey Center in Onondaga County, New York. It is a one-story frame building on a stone foundation, 24 feet wide and 32 feet deep. The roof features a small belfry. It was built in 1857 and ceased being used as a school in 1943.

It was listed on the National Register of Historic Places in 1998.

A related 1840 schoolhouse in Pompey was destroyed by fire in January 2010.
