= Oran District No. 22 Schoolhouse =

- U.S. National Register of Historic Places
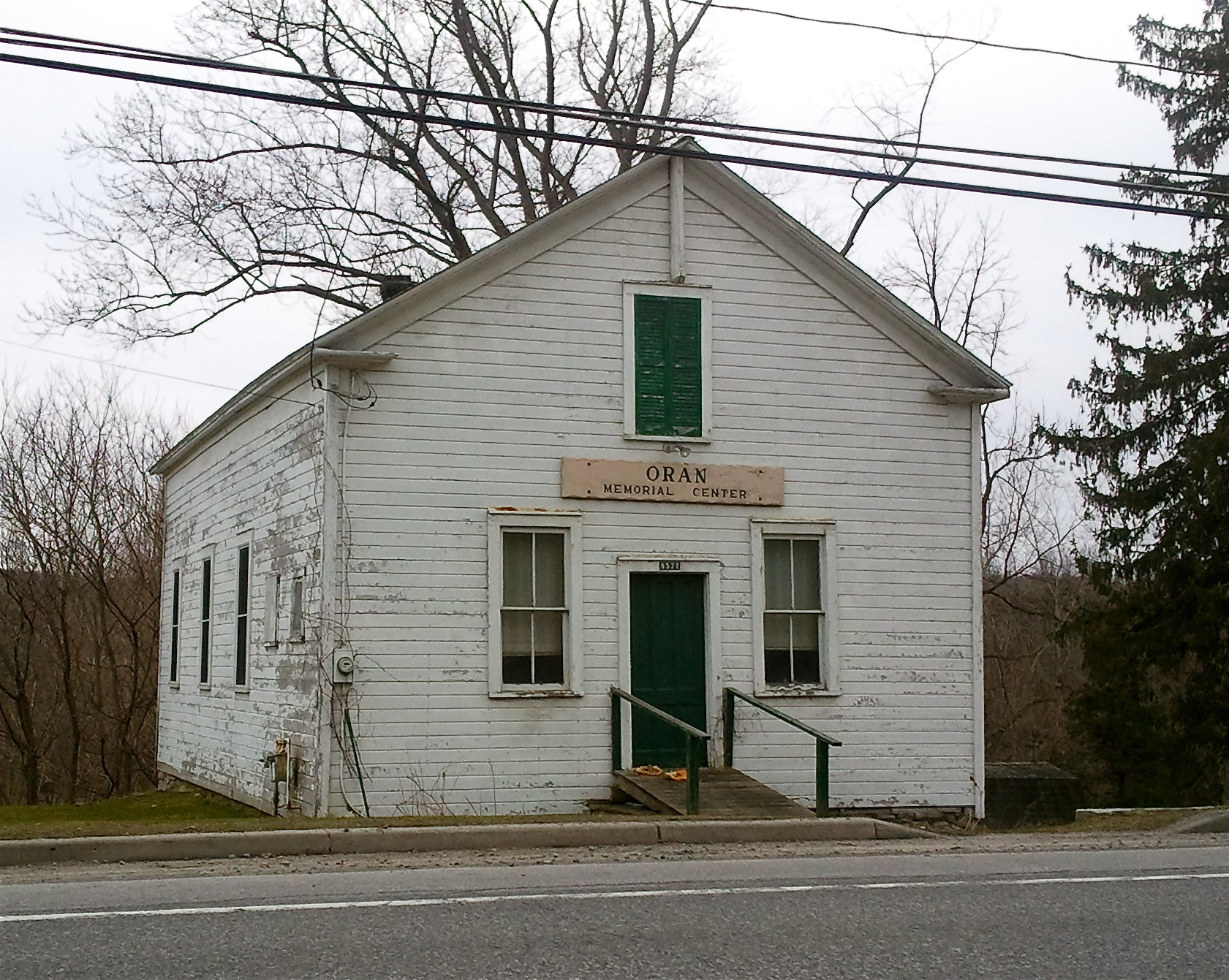
- Oran District No. 22 Schoolhouse, March 2011

- Location within New York Location within the United States
- Location: Jct. of NY 92 and Delphi Rd., Oran, New York
- Coordinates: 42°58′43″N 75°56′6″W
- Area: 0.3 acres (0.12 ha)
- Built: 1830
- Architectural style: Federal, Late Victorian
- NRHP reference No.: 98001002
- Added to NRHP: August 06, 1998

Oran District No. 22 Schoolhouse is a historic one-room school building located at Oran in Onondaga County, New York. It is a one-story frame building on a stone foundation, 25 feet wide and 41 feet deep. It was originally built in the 1830s as a store and post office. It was remodeled sometime before the 1860s for use as a school. It ceased being used as a school in 1951 and is now used as a community center.

It was listed on the National Register of Historic Places in 1998.
