= John Dutton Candee =

American newspaper editor and politician

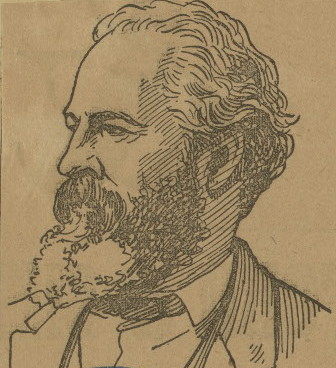
John Dutton Candee

John Dutton Candee (June 12, 1819 – February 27, 1888) was an American newspaper editor and politician.

Candee, younger son of Benjamin and Almira C. (Dutton) Candee, was born in Pompey, Onondaga County, New York, June 12, 1819. His parents returned about 1825 to their native state of Connecticut, where his mother was soon left a widow in needy circumstances. At the age of 13 he began to work in a printing office in New Haven, and continued in the business until his admission to the Sophomore Class of Yale College. Upon graduation in 1847, he took a two years' course at Yale Law School, and after a year's absence prospecting in Iowa returned to New Haven and practiced law for about twelve years.

He then took temporary charge of the editorial department of the New Haven Journal and Courier, and finding the occupation congenial, he purchased in 1863 a controlling interest in the Bridgeport Daily Standard, and removed to that city. He continued in this position until his death in Bridgeport, after an illness of several weeks, on February 27, 1888, in his 69th year. In 1882, he was the unsuccessful Republican candidate for Lieutenant Governor of Connecticut.

He married, October 29, 1863, Sallie B. Smith, daughter of the Rev. Dr. Samuel F. Smith, of Newton Center, Mass., who survived him with two of their three daughters.

This article incorporates public domain material from the 1888 Yale Obituary Record.
