= Drover's Tavern =

Historic commercial building in New York, United States

- U.S. National Register of Historic Places
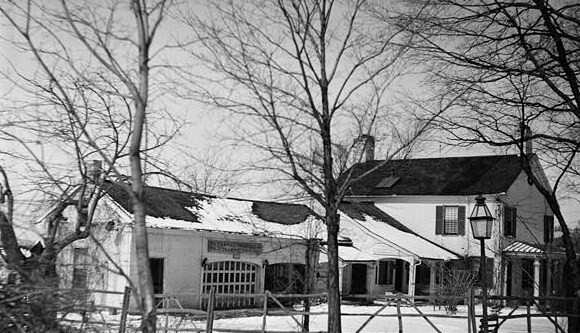
- Travelers' & Drovers' Tavern

- Location within New York Location within the United States
- Nearest city: Oran, New York
- Coordinates: 42°58′3.72″N 75°54′57.46″W
- Built: 1803
- Architectural style: Federal
- NRHP reference No.: 03000265
- Added to NRHP: April 18, 2003

Drover's Tavern, also known as Travelers' & Drovers' Tavern, is a historic brick building in Oran, New York. According to HABS documentation, it was built in 1825 by Elisha Stanley.

An original sign at the stable end of the tavern reads ENTERTAINMENT FOR TRAVELERS AND DROVERS.

It was listed on the National Register of Historic Places in 2003.

== See also ==
Atwell's 1928 Cazenovia, Past & Present: A Descriptive and Historical Record of the Village for its discussion of drovers and taverns that describes this or another nearby upstate New York area.
