= Syracuse and Suburban Railroad =

Overview
- Headquarters: Syracuse, New York
- Locale: Syracuse, New York
- Dates of operation: 1895–1921

Technical
- Track gauge: 4 ft 8 1/2 in (1,435 mm) standard gauge

The Syracuse and Suburban Railroad, an interurban rail in Syracuse, New York, was chartered on June 29, 1895. The main line of this electric road, also known as the Syracuse and Suburban Electric Railroad and the Syracuse and Eastern Railroad, ran 15 miles (24 km), over the beds of city streets, extending from Syracuse to Fayetteville and Manlius where it ended at Edwards Falls, a local tourist attraction. The railroad also operated a line that ran from Orville, now known as DeWitt to Jamesville, for a total distance of 18.08 miles (29.10 km).
