= New York State Route 598 =

State highway in Onondaga County, New York, US

New York State Route 598
- NY 598 highlighted in red

Route information
- Maintained by NYSDOT and the city of Syracuse
- Length: 2.31 mi (3.72 km)
- Existed: c. 2004–present

Major junctions
- South end: NY 5 in Syracuse
- I-690 in Syracuse
- North end: NY 298 in Salina

Location
- Country: United States
- State: New York
- Counties: Onondaga

Highway system
- New York Highways; Interstate; US; State; Reference; Parkways
← NY 590	→ NY 631

New York State Route 598 (NY 598) is a north–south state highway located within Onondaga County, New York, in the United States. It extends for 2.31 miles (3.72 km) from an intersection with NY 5 in the city of Syracuse to a junction with NY 298 in the adjacent town of Salina. The route intersects Interstate 690 (I-690) near its southern terminus and passes through Syracuse's Eastwood neighborhood near its midpoint, where it meets NY 290.

NY 598 was assigned c. 2004. The northernmost portion of the route replaced NY 930M, a short unsigned reference route that extended from NY 298 in Salina southeast to the Syracuse city line at North Midler Avenue. NY 930M itself was a remnant of New York State Route 433, a highway assigned in the early 1950s and removed in the mid-1960s that, upon removal, followed the same alignment as modern NY 598.

== Route description ==
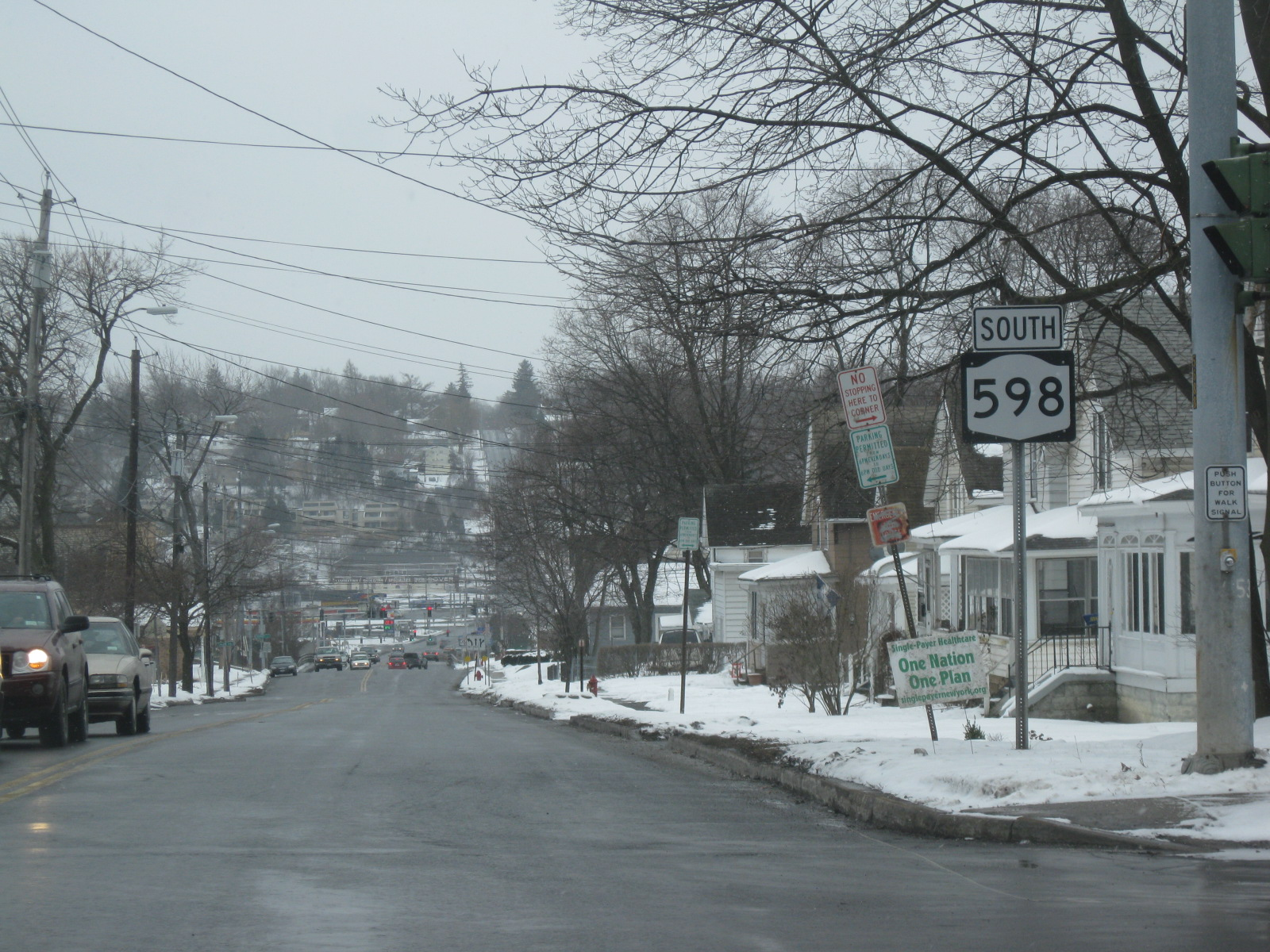
Southbound on NY 598 at the intersection of South Midler Avenue and Sunnycrest Road in Syracuse

NY 598 begins at an intersection with NY 5 (Erie Boulevard) east of downtown Syracuse. The route heads north as the four-lane South Midler Avenue, crossing a CSX Transportation-owned railroad spur known as the Peat Street Runner at-grade ahead of an interchange with I-690 (exit 11) at the southern edge of the Eastwood neighborhood. North of I-690, the route narrows to two lanes as it travels through the densely populated residential neighborhood.

The homes cease temporarily around NY 598's intersection with NY 290 (James Street), a prominent retail corridor in eastern Syracuse. Upon crossing NY 290, NY 598 becomes North Midler Avenue as it becomes surrounded by houses once more. At the Syracuse city line three blocks to the north, North Midler Avenue splits off to the northeast while NY 598 becomes New Court Avenue. The switch in both the town of DeWitt and name also brings about a switch in surroundings as the route heads northwest into a heavily industrial area built up along CSX's Mohawk Subdivision rail line. NY 598 ends shortly afterward at an intersection with NY 298 just inside the Salina town line. The portion of NY 598 in DeWitt and Salina is maintained by the New York State Department of Transportation (NYSDOT); the remainder of the route is maintained by the city of Syracuse.

== History ==
All of Midler Avenue, including the portion of the street not currently part of NY 598 in DeWitt, was originally designated as NY 433 in the early 1950s. At the time, NY 433 ended at the junction of Midler Avenue and Court Street Road (then NY 298). By 1954, New Court Avenue, an east–west connector between NY 298 and NY 433 in DeWitt, was designated as NY 436. In the late 1950s, construction began on a bypass of Court Street that extended from the western terminus of NY 436 in Salina to the junction of NY 298 and Thompson Road (modern NY 635) in DeWitt. The bypass was opened to traffic as a realignment of NY 298 by 1961. NY 433 was then extended northeastward along NY 298's former routing on Court Street to Carrier Circle, where it met the realigned NY 298.

The alignments of NY 433 and NY 436 north of the Syracuse city line were flipped c. 1962, placing NY 433 on Midler Avenue and New Court Avenue and NY 436 on Midler Avenue and Court Street Road. Both designations were removed at some point in the latter half of the 1960s. The portion of NY 433's former routing outside of Syracuse became NY 930M, an unsigned reference route. NY 930M went unchanged until c. 2004 when it was incorporated into NY 598, a new route extending from NY 5 to NY 298 by way of NY 433's final alignment.

== Major intersections ==
The entire route is in Onondaga County.

Location	mi	km	Destinations	Notes
Syracuse	0.00	0.00	NY 5	Southern terminus
Syracuse	0.34	0.55	I-690 to I-81 – Downtown, DeWitt	Exit 18 (I-690)
Syracuse	1.05	1.69	NY 290	
Salina	2.31	3.72	NY 298	Northern terminus; community of Lyncourt
1.000 mi = 1.609 km; 1.000 km = 0.621 mi
