= New York State Route 290 =

State highway in Onondaga County, New York, US

New York State Route 290
- Map of Onondaga County in central New York with NY 290 highlighted in red

Route information
- Maintained by NYSDOT and the City of Syracuse
- Length: 12.40 mi (19.96 km)
- Existed: 1930–present

Major junctions
- West end: US 11 in Syracuse
- East end: NY 5 in Manlius

Location
- Country: United States
- State: New York
- Counties: Onondaga

Highway system
- New York Highways; Interstate; US; State; Reference; Parkways
← I-290	→ NY 291

New York State Route 290 (NY 290) is a state highway located entirely within Onondaga County, New York, extending from downtown Syracuse to the east side of the county. It provides access to Green Lakes State Park from the north.

NY 290 is one of several state highways linking Syracuse and its eastern suburbs.

== Route description ==
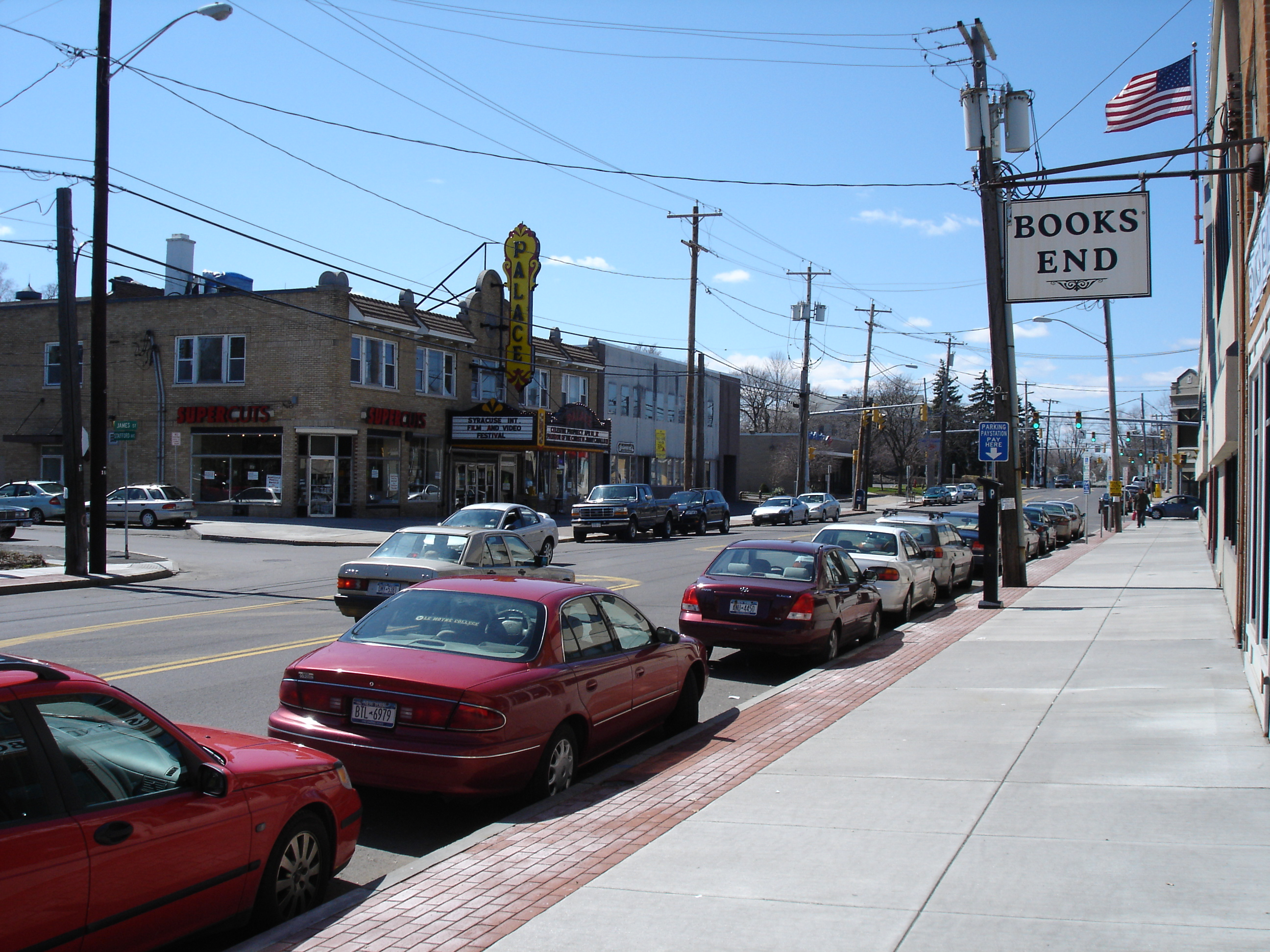
NY 290 in the Eastwood neighborhood of Syracuse

NY 290 begins at an intersection with US 11 (North State Street) in the shadows of I-81 Bus and I-690 in downtown Syracuse. NY 290 proceeds northeast along James Street, a four-lane commercial street through downtown Syracuse, crossing through the Near Northeast neighborhood. Passing numerous apartment buildings and residential complexes, the route continues past multiple commercial businesses before crossing into the Sedgwick neighborhood. NY 290 continues along James Street, now a four-lane residential street in a less dense section of Syracuse. Crossing Teall Avenue, the southern continuation of County Route 228 (CR 228), the route enters the Eastwood neighborhood of Syracuse.

In Eastwood, NY 290 continues northeast along James Street until reaching Shotwell Park, where it junctions with Grant Boulevard. At this junction, NY 290 turns eastward along James Street, becoming a two-lane commercial street. Several blocks to the east of Grant, NY 290 reaches a junction with NY 598 (Midler Avenue). Continuing through Eastwood, the route expands to four lanes near the local water tower and crosses into the town of De Witt, where it junctions with NY 635 (Thompson Road) above railroad tracks. NY 290 continues eastward through De Witt, becoming a four-lane boulevard through the town, reaching a fork with West Manlius Street, where James Street continues east as CR 53A and NY 290 turns southeast on West Manlius.

Back to two lanes, NY 290 proceeds southeast along West Manlius Street, a residential street through De Witt before crossing into the village of East Syracuse. At the junction with Burnet Street, NY 290 enters the center of East Syracuse, becoming a two-lane commercial street, changing to East Manlius Street at North Center Street. Two blocks east of this junction, NY 290 reaches a junction with Bridge Street, where East Manlius continues towards CR 77, while NY 290 turns southeast on Bridge. Crossing over tracks used by CSX Transportation by its Mohawk Subdivision, NY 290 reaches a junction with Bridge Street and Manlius Center Road, where NY 290 turns northeast along Manlius Center.

Now a six-lane arterial, NY 290 proceeds northeast through East Syracuse, turning east as it bypasses the Walmart Connection Center. Crossing back into the town of De Witt, the route reduces to two lanes, crossing under the lanes of I-81. The route becomes a two-lane commercial street through De Witt, soon crossing into the town of Manlius. Through Manlius, NY 290 does not change from a two-lane commercial roadway, turning southeast near Fremont Road. Becoming a residential road, the route reaches a junction with the northern terminus of North Burdick Street (CR 94). Near Sunset Drive, the route turns eastward once again, running along the northern edge of The Links at Erie Village, turning southeast again at Clemons Road.

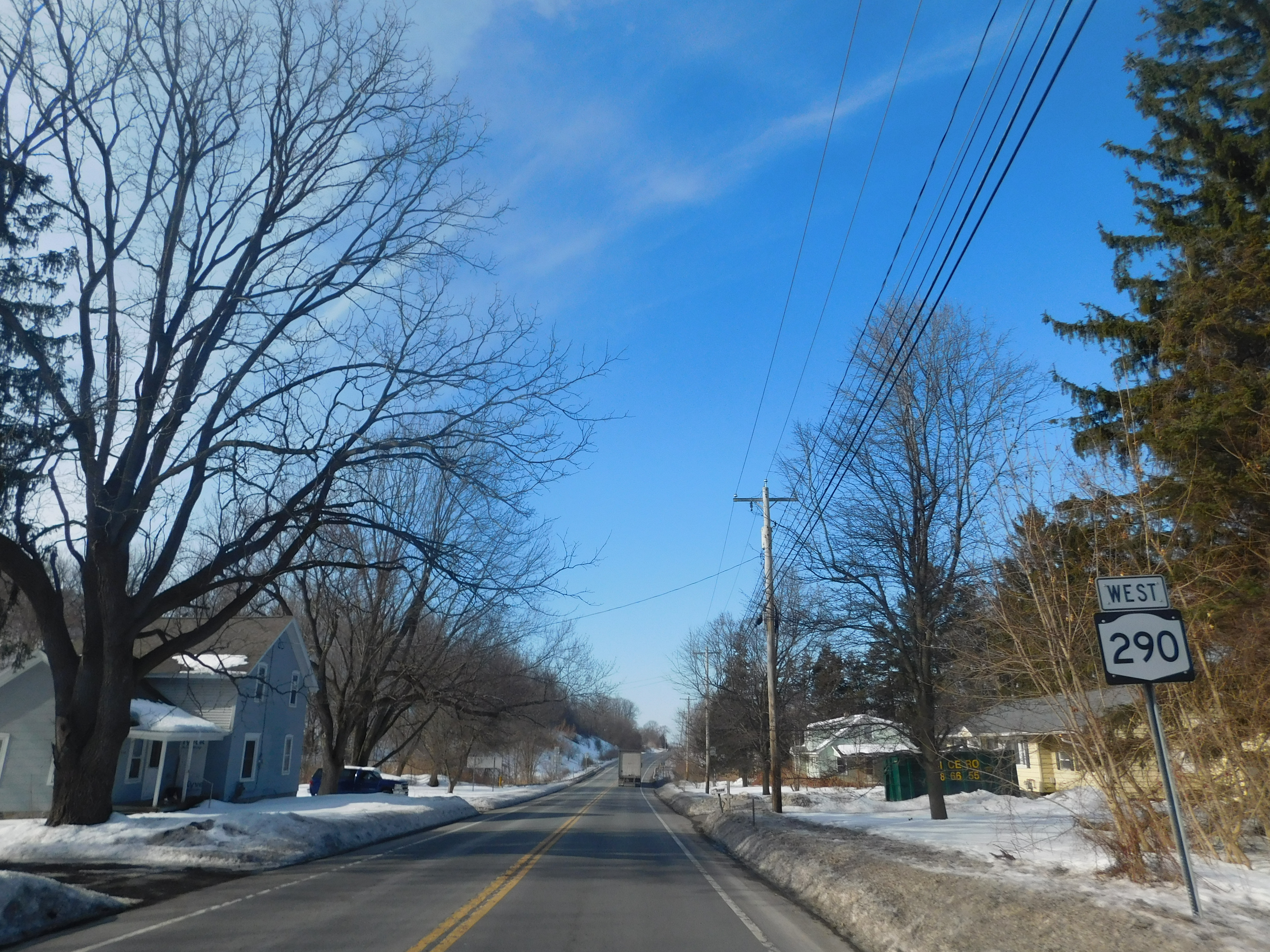
NY 290 stretching away from its terminus on NY 5 at Mycenae

NY 290 crosses over Limestone Creek as it runs southeast through Manlius. Passing a junction with Minoa Road (CR 55), the route crosses over an old alignment of the Erie Canal and reaches a junction with the northern terminus of NY 257 (North Manlius Road). At this junction, NY 290 turns northeast as Green Lakes Road, paralleling the former Erie Canal through the town of Manlius. Passing Green Lakes State Park, the route passes the main entrance gate as it bends eastward along the canalway. At the junction with Pierson Road, the route leaves Green Lakes State Park and continues eastward away from the old canal. Now a two-lane farm road, NY 290 reaches a junction with the southern terminus of Kirkville Road North (CR 1).

Just east of this junction, NY 290 reaches a junction with Kinderhook Road, where it turns southeast along Green Lakes. Now a two-lane residential/rural roadway, NY 290 continues southeast into the hamlet of Mycenae, where it reaches a junction with NY 5 (Genesee Turnpike). This junction marks the eastern terminus of NY 290, less than 1 mile (1.6 km) from the Madison County line.

== History ==
The entirety of NY 290 was assigned as part of the 1930 renumbering of state highways in New York.

== Major intersections ==
The entire route is in Onondaga County.

Location	mi	km	Destinations	Notes
Syracuse	0.00	0.00	US 11 (North State Street)	Western terminus
Syracuse	2.50	4.02	NY 598 (Midler Avenue)	
Town of DeWitt	3.30	5.31	NY 635 (Thompson Road) to I-90 / I-690	
East Syracuse	4.71	7.58	NY 930P (Bridge Street) to I-690 / I-81 / NY 5 – Syracuse, DeWitt	To I-81 via I-690
Town of Manlius	8.33	13.41	NY 257 south (North Manlius Road) – Fayetteville	Northern terminus of NY 257
Town of Manlius	12.40	19.96	NY 5 (Genesee Turnpike) – Chittenango, Utica, Fayetteville, Syracuse	Eastern terminus; hamlet of Mycenae
1.000 mi = 1.609 km; 1.000 km = 0.621 mi
