= New York State Route 298 =

State highway in Onondaga County, New York, US

New York State Route 298
- Map of the Syracuse area with NY 298 highlighted in red

Route information
- Maintained by NYSDOT and the city of Syracuse
- Length: 14.05 mi (22.61 km)
- Existed: c. 1934–present

Major junctions
- West end: I-690 in Syracuse
- I-90 / New York Thruway / NY 635 in DeWitt; I-81 in DeWitt
- East end: NY 31 in Cicero

Location
- Country: United States
- State: New York
- Counties: Onondaga

Highway system
- New York Highways; Interstate; US; State; Reference; Parkways
← NY 297	→ NY 299

New York State Route 298 (NY 298) is an east–west state highway located entirely within Onondaga County, New York, in the United States. It runs in a generally northeast direction for 14.05 miles (22.61 km) from an interchange with Interstate 690 (I-690) in the city of Syracuse to a roundabout intersection with NY 31 near the shores of Oneida Lake. Along its course it has exits with all four Interstate Highways in the area. Most of NY 298 was originally designated as part of NY 91 in 1930 before gaining its current designation later in the decade.

== Route description ==
Most of NY 298 is maintained by the New York State Department of Transportation (NYSDOT); however, one section in Syracuse—from the junction of Bear Street and Genant Drive to the eastern city line—is city-maintained.

=== City of Syracuse ===
NY 298 begins just west of downtown Syracuse, where it splits from I-690 at exit 7, a partial interchange providing same-direction connections only. It heads northeast as Bear Street, passing by several commercial and industrial blocks as it crosses over Onondaga Creek, which flows into nearby Onondaga Lake. After four large blocks, NY 298 meets I-81 at exit 5A. The route leaves Bear Street here to follow a southeastward track on Genant Drive and Sunset Avenue, which form a one-way couplet in the vicinity of I-81. NY 298 eastbound follows the former along I-81's southwestern edge, while westbound traffic is routed along the latter on the freeway's northeastern side. This stretch of NY 298 provides access from I-690 eastbound to I-81 northbound, one connection missing at the two freeways' interchange in downtown.

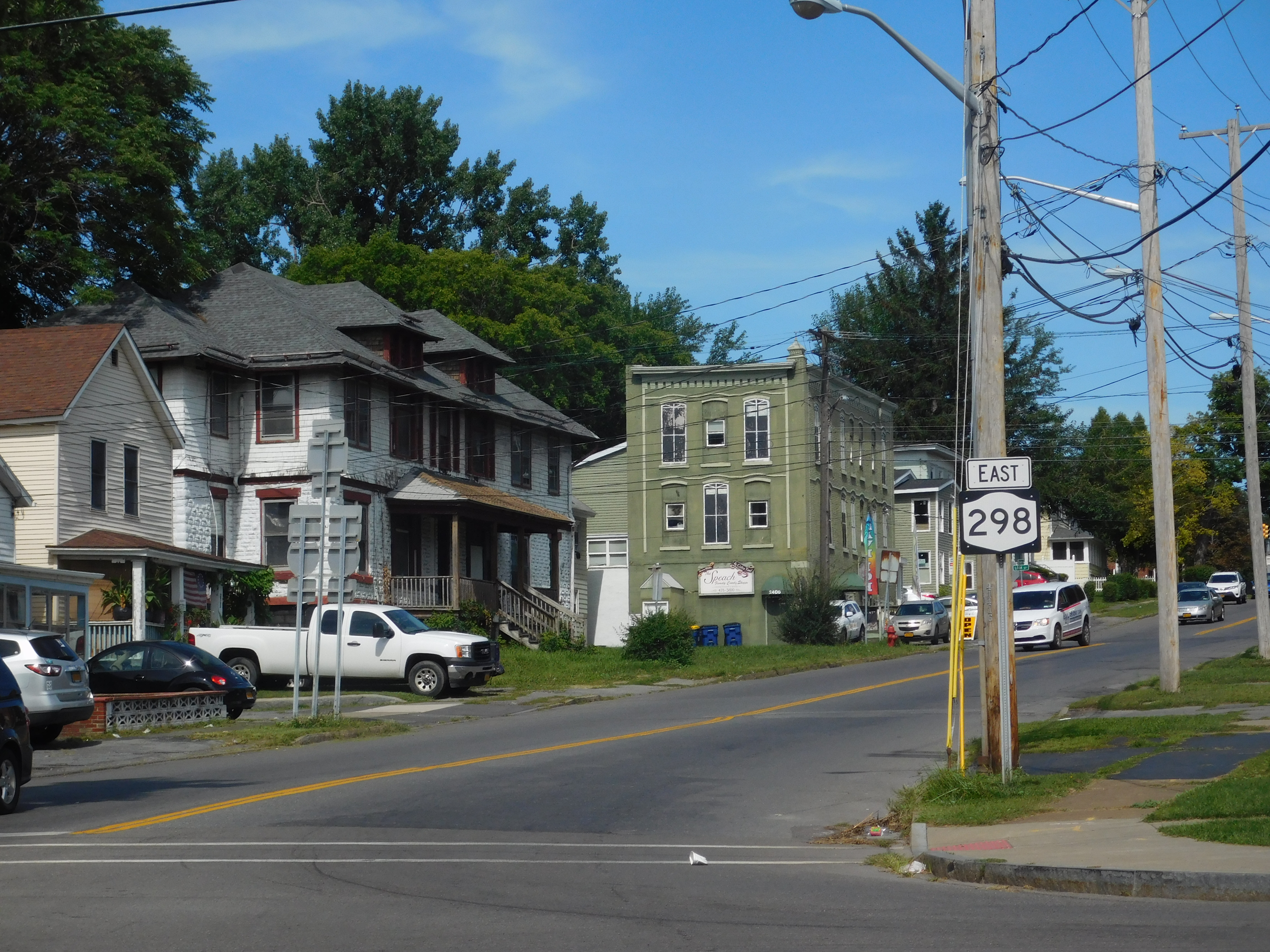
NY 298 east in Syracuse

The couplet lasts for just two blocks to Court Street, where both directions of NY 298 turn north to enter a more residential area of the city. Just two blocks north of I-81 Bus at North Salina Street, NY 298 intersects with U.S. Route 11 (US 11), which closely parallels I-81 Bus as it runs through Syracuse. From here, the route slowly curves to take a more easterly course through the residential northern portion of the city. It seamlessly crosses into the town of Salina, eventually completing the eastern turn as it heads through the town. The homes begin to give way to businesses and industrial areas at the hamlet of Lyncourt, where NY 298 becomes a four-lane divided highway and connects to the north end of NY 598. From here, NY 298 heads northeast, losing the Court Street name as it passes under the CSX Transportation-owned Mohawk Subdivision and crosses into the town of DeWitt.

Past the railroad overpass, NY 298 enters a heavily industrial area, where it serves industrial parks on both sides of the highway. It connects to Townline Road by way of a traffic circle known locally as Military Circle, from where the road heads due east to a larger traffic circle named Carrier Circle. The circle is one of two in the state that directly connects to an exit on the New York State Thruway (I-90), here exit 35. NY 635 comes in from the south here as well via Thompson Road, terminating inside of the circle. East of the circle, NY 298 turns northward on a long arc, serving a handful of smaller industrial parks before crossing over the Thruway as Kinne Street.

=== Northeastern Onondaga County ===
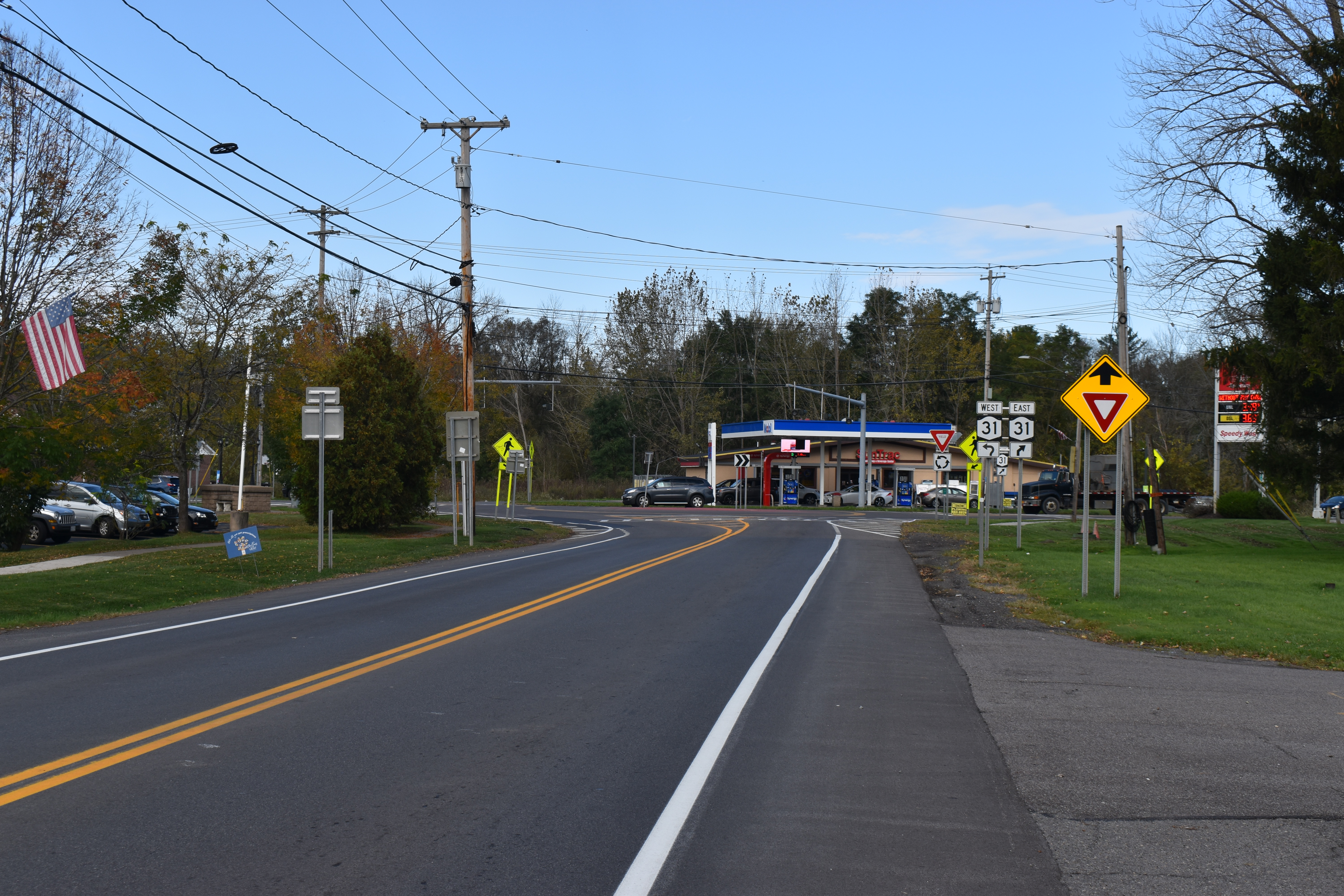
Northern terminus of NY 298 at NY 31

The suburbs slowly begin to taper off north of the Thruway, where NY 298 becomes Collamer Road after Kinne Street leaves at a northeastern turn in the route. It narrows back into a two-lane undivided highway and proceeds through the pockets of residential and commercial development that comprise the hamlet of Collamer on its way to an interchange with I-81 at exit 91. After the I-81 junction, it heads east yet slightly northwards into the town of Manlius, where the dense commercial and residential areas give way to more rural regions with only a handful of homes. NY 298 continues across increasingly flat, wooded and undeveloped country to a four-way junction named Shepps Corners. Here, the route turns northeast once again, changing names to Minoa–Bridgeport Road as it enters Cicero.

Not far from the town line, all development along the road ceases as it enters the Cicero Swamp Wildlife Management Area, which covers part of a large, low-lying swamp known as Cicero Swamp. It heads across wooded swampland for about 1.25 miles (2.01 km), becoming Minoa Road in the process. Homes begin to line the highway again just north of the marsh, where NY 298 makes a slight turn to the north as it begins to parallel Chittenango Creek, here forming the boundary between Onondaga County and Madison County. The waterway leads the highway into the commercialized hamlet of Oneida Park, where NY 298 ends at a roundabout intersection with NY 31. On the opposite bank of the creek is the slightly larger community of Bridgeport, located just east of Oneida Park on NY 31.

== History ==
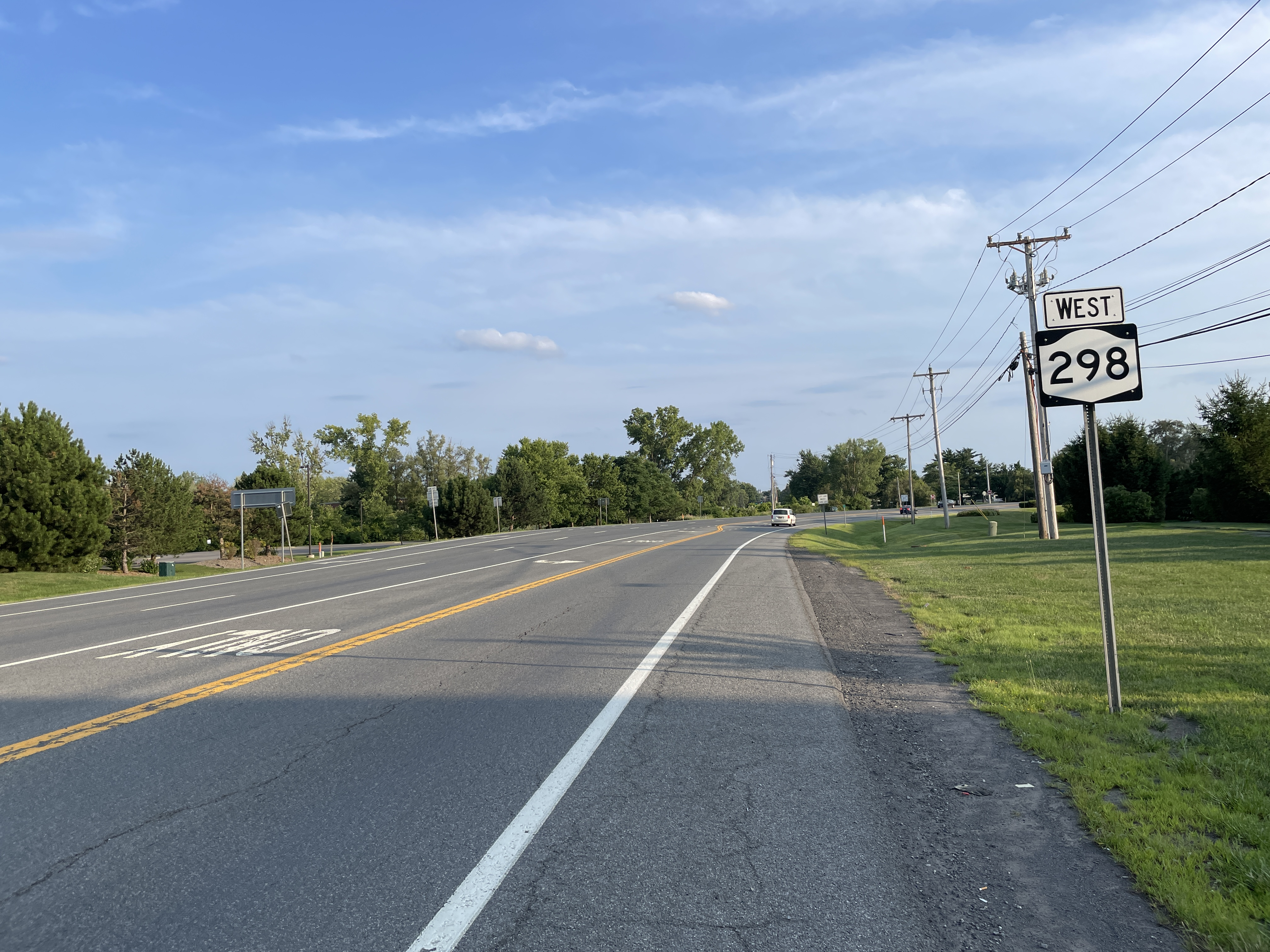
NY 298 westbound in East Syracuse

The portion of modern NY 298 from Salina Street (US 11) in downtown Syracuse to NY 31 near Bridgeport was originally designated as the northernmost portion of NY 91 as part of the 1930 renumbering of state highways in New York. At the time, NY 91 was routed on a then-complete Court Street and Collamer Road between Midler Avenue and Molloy Road. NY 91 was truncated to the intersection of US 11 and NY 173 south of Syracuse c. 1934. Its former routing from the former northern terminus of its overlap with US 11 to Bridgeport was redesignated as NY 298.

In the 1950s, NY 298 was altered between Midler Avenue and Molloy Road to follow its modern alignment. As part of the rerouting, two traffic circles—the Carrier Circle at the intersection with Thompson Road and the New York State Thruway, and Military Circle at Townline Road—were installed along the route. By 1962, NY 298 had been extended southwestward to its current terminus at I-690 exit 9 (now exit 7). At the time, traffic on I-690 flowed directly onto NY 298 and vice versa as the remainder of I-690 east of the interchange had yet to be built. I-690 was completed from NY 298 to Midler Avenue in the mid-1960s.

== Major intersections ==
The entire route is in Onondaga County.

Location	mi	km	Destinations	Notes
Syracuse	0.00	0.00	I-690 west to I-90	Western terminus; exit 14 (I-690)
Syracuse	1.04	1.67	I-81 BL south to I-690 east	Exit 4B (BL I-81); access from NY 298 eastbound
Syracuse	1.22	1.96	I-81 BL north	Access from NY 298 westbound
Syracuse	1.37	2.20	US 11 (North Salina Street)	
Salina	3.74	6.02	NY 598 south (New Court Avenue) – Eastwood	Northern terminus of NY 598; neighborhood of Lyncourt
DeWitt	5.45	8.77	I-90 / New York Thruway / NY 635 south (Thompson Road) – Buffalo, Albany	Carrier Circle; exit 35 (I-90 / Thruway); northern terminus of NY 635
DeWitt	8.28	13.33	I-81 to I-90 – Syracuse, Dewitt, North Syracuse, Oswego	Exit 91 (I-81); partial cloverleaf interchange
Cicero	14.05	22.61	NY 31	Eastern terminus; roundabout; hamlet of Bridgeport
1.000 mi = 1.609 km; 1.000 km = 0.621 mi
