= East Geneva, New York =

Hamlet in New York, United States

Coordinates: 42°52′53″N 76°56′25″W

East Geneva, also called Serven, is a hamlet in the Town of Waterloo, Seneca County, New York, United States, near Seneca Lake. It is located three miles (5 km) east of the City of Geneva and five miles (8 km) west of the Village of Waterloo, at an elevation of 472 feet (144 m). The primary cross roads where the hamlet is located are U.S. Route 20/N.Y. Route 5, Border City Road (CR 110), Serven Road and Seneca Boulevard.
