= New York State Route 5 =

State highway in New York, US

New York State Route 5
- Map of New York with NY 5 highlighted in red (NY 5B looping south of NY 5 near Kirkland) and former routings maintained as reference routes in blue

Route information
- Maintained by NYSDOT and the cities of Buffalo, Syracuse, Utica, Amsterdam, Schenectady, and Albany
- Length: 370.80 mi (596.74 km)
- Existed: 1924–present
- Tourist routes: Great Lakes Seaway Trail; Lake Erie Circle Tour

Major junctions
- West end: PA 5 at the Pennsylvania state line in Ripley
- US 20 from Silver Creek to Irving; I-190 in Buffalo; I-90 / New York Thruway / I-290 in Amherst; NY 33 / NY 63 / NY 98 in Batavia; NY 21 / NY 332 in Canandaigua; I-81 / I-690 / US 11 in Syracuse; NY 8 / NY 12 / NY 49 in Utica; I-90 / New York Thruway in Utica; NY 7 in Schenectady; I-87 in Colonie
- East end: Quay Street in Albany

Location
- Country: United States
- State: New York
- Counties: Chautauqua, Erie, Genesee, Livingston, Ontario, Seneca, Cayuga, Onondaga, Madison, Oneida, Herkimer, Montgomery, Schenectady, Albany

Highway system
- New York Highways; Interstate; US; State; Reference; Parkways
← US 4	→ NY 5A

New York State Route 5 (NY 5) is a state highway that extends for 370.80 miles (596.74 km) across the state of New York in the United States. It begins at the Pennsylvania state line in the Chautauqua County town of Ripley and passes through Buffalo, Syracuse, Utica, Schenectady, and several other smaller cities and communities on its way to downtown Albany in Albany County, where it terminates at U.S. Route 9 (US 9), here routed along the service roads for Interstate 787 (I-787). Prior to the construction of the New York State Thruway, it was one of two main east–west highways traversing upstate New York, the other being US 20. West of New York, the road continues as Pennsylvania Route 5 (PA 5) to Erie.

NY 5 overlaps with US 20 twice along its routing. The second, a 68-mile (109 km) overlap through western and central New York, is the second-longest concurrency in the state, stretching from Avon in Livingston County east to the city of Auburn in Cayuga County. The concurrency is known locally as "Routes 5 and 20". As the route proceeds across the state, it also directly or indirectly meets every major north–south highway in upstate New York, including all three north–south Interstate Highways (I-390 in Avon, I-81 in Syracuse via US 11, and I-87 in Albany).

NY 5 was assigned in 1924 as a true cross-state highway, extending from the Pennsylvania state line in the west to the Massachusetts state line in the east, mostly by way of modern US 20. At the time, modern NY 5 between Buffalo and Albany was designated as New York State Route 5A. By 1926, NY 5 was moved onto the routing of NY 5A while the old routing of NY 5 became NY 7. It was truncated in 1927 to Athol Springs in the west and Albany in the east following the assignment of US 20, and again in 1930 to downtown Buffalo. NY 5 was reextended to the Pennsylvania state line c. 1932 by way of its old routing to Athol Springs, an old alignment of US 20, and a lakeside spur route of US 20 that had been assigned in 1930. Only local realignments have occurred since.

== Route description ==
Although it is no longer commonly used for long-distance travel, NY 5 is still regionally important. NY 5 is named Main Street in Buffalo, Erie Boulevard and West Genesee Street in Syracuse, State Street in Schenectady, and Central Avenue in Albany, the state capital. It is a major local road in many other locations along its path. NY 5 runs concurrent to US 20 twice between its endpoints: for three miles (5 km) between Silver Creek and Irving and for 68 miles (109 km) across western and central New York. At 67.6 miles (108 km) in length, the eastern overlap between US 20 and NY 5 is the second-longest surface-road concurrency in New York state, behind only the concurrency of I-86 and NY 17 in the Southern Tier.

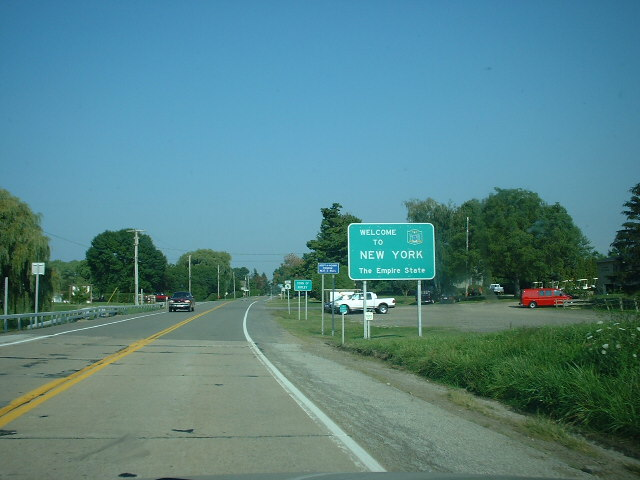
The western terminus of NY 5 at the Pennsylvania state line, from where the first reference and reassurance markers on NY 5 eastbound are visible.

Maintenance of the majority of NY 5's 371 miles (597 km) is performed by the New York State Department of Transportation. However, locally owned and maintained sections exist in six cities. The city-maintained sections of NY 5 are in Buffalo from NY 16 north to the city line (except of the Goodell Street portion, which is state-maintained); in Syracuse between the western city line and just west of NY 635; in Utica from Leland Avenue east to the city line; in Amsterdam between Division and West Main streets; in Schenectady from Washington Avenue to the eastern city line; and the entirety of NY 5 within Albany.

=== Pennsylvania to Buffalo ===
At the New York–Pennsylvania border in Ripley, PA 5 becomes NY 5 upon entering New York. It very closely follows the shore of Lake Erie through all of Chautauqua County. Once reaching the village of Silver Creek it briefly overlaps US 20 until entering Erie County at the Cattaraugus Reservation and NY 438 where the roads once again split. Once in Erie County, it pulls slightly inward from the lake shore from Brant to the hamlet of Wanakah. Once past Wanakah, the road once again closely borders the lake shore and goes through steadily more heavily developed areas, particularly the Ford Stamping Plant and the Bethlehem Steel plant in the city of Lackawanna. There the road becomes the Hamburg Turnpike and eight wind-powered turbines, which provide power to the national grid, are visible. Near the northern edge of the city, NY 5 begins to ascend onto an elevated roadway as it connects to Ridge Road and the Buffalo and Erie County Botanical Gardens by way of an interchange. Here, the route becomes the a limited-access highway with exits for Ohio and Tifft streets and Fuhrmann Boulevard. After a quarter-mile, NY 5 passes seamlessly into the city of Buffalo.

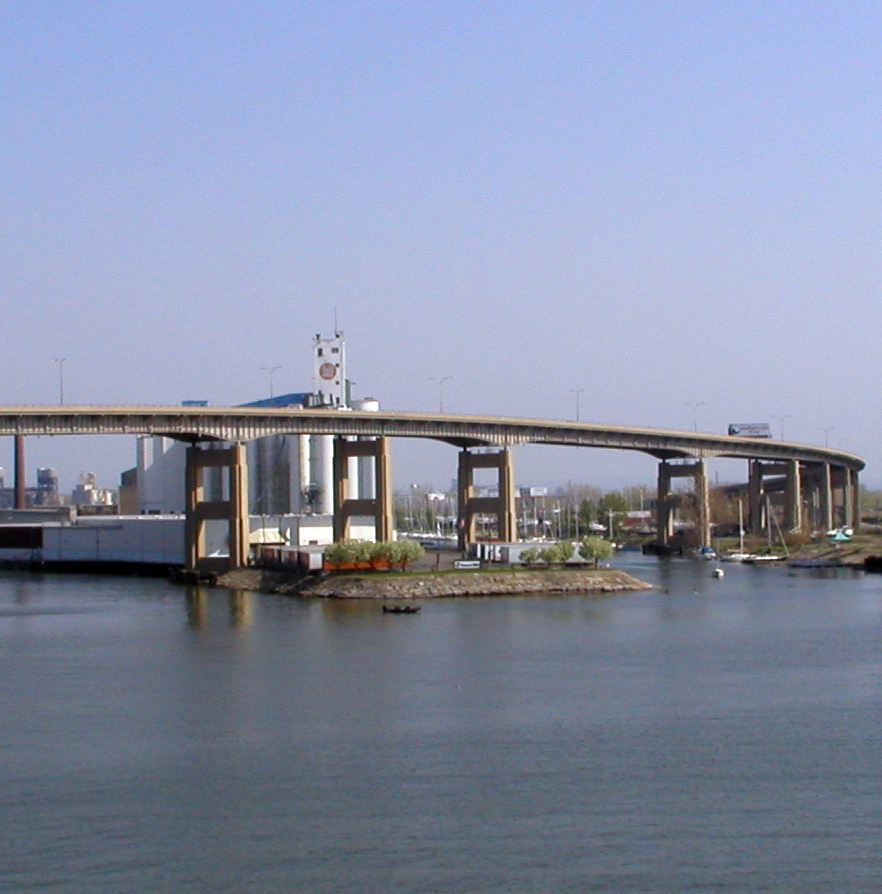
The Skyway (NY 5) as it passes over the Buffalo River.

A short distance past the city line, NY 5 passes over the Union Ship Canal on a span of the elevated road known as the Father Baker Bridge. North of the waterway, the elevated section of NY 5 gains a frontage road named Fuhrmann Boulevard. Both the service road and NY 5 run parallel to Lake Erie until the northern end of the Buffalo Outer Harbor. Here, the frontage roads end while NY 5 turns to the northeast, crossing the Buffalo River on the bridge called The Skyway, and entering downtown. On the north bank, the Skyway returns to a northerly routing as it passes KeyBank Center, located directly to the east, and Buffalo and Erie County Naval & Military Park, situated to the west, and meets I-190 at exit 7. Past the interchange, the Skyway ends and the route descends in elevation, becoming an at-grade roadway once more at Church Street in the shadow of Buffalo City Hall. NY 384 begins here, following Delaware Avenue north into the heart of downtown, while NY 5 turns east onto Church.

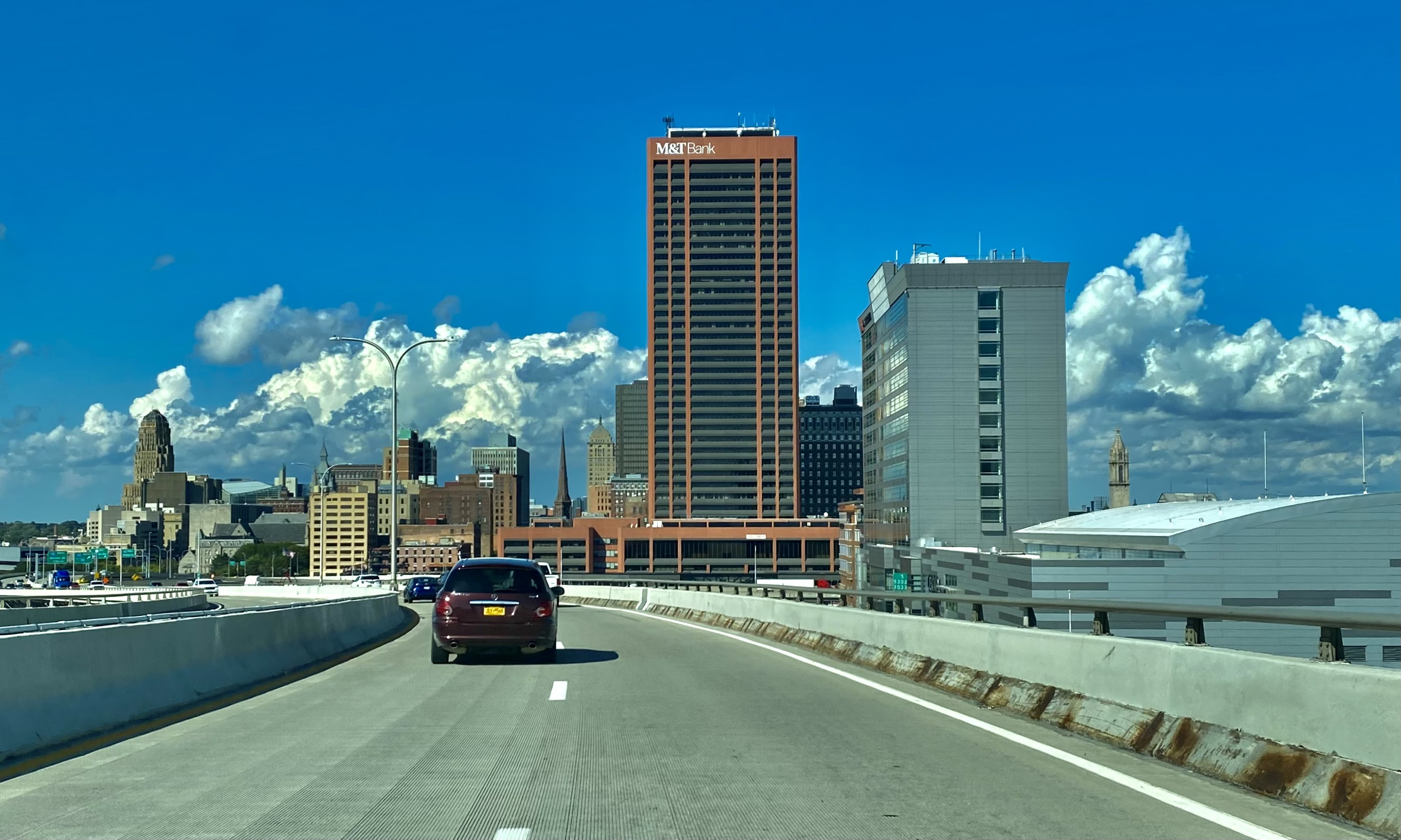
Approaching downtown Buffalo on the Skyway

At Main Street, Church Street splits into a pair of one-way streets and becomes North and South Division Street. The route follows South Division eastward for two blocks to an intersection with Ellicott Street located one block north of Sahlen Field. At the junction, which includes the northern terminus of NY 16, NY 5 turns northward, rejoining NY 5 westbound one block later at North Division. The route continues on Ellicott for nine blocks to the unidirectional East Tupper Street, where NY 5 westbound separates from the route once more. NY 5 eastbound, however, continues north on Ellicott for an additional block to the one-way Goodell Street. NY 5 heads west on Goodell for two blocks before turning north onto Main Street, rejoining NY 5 westbound at the intersection.

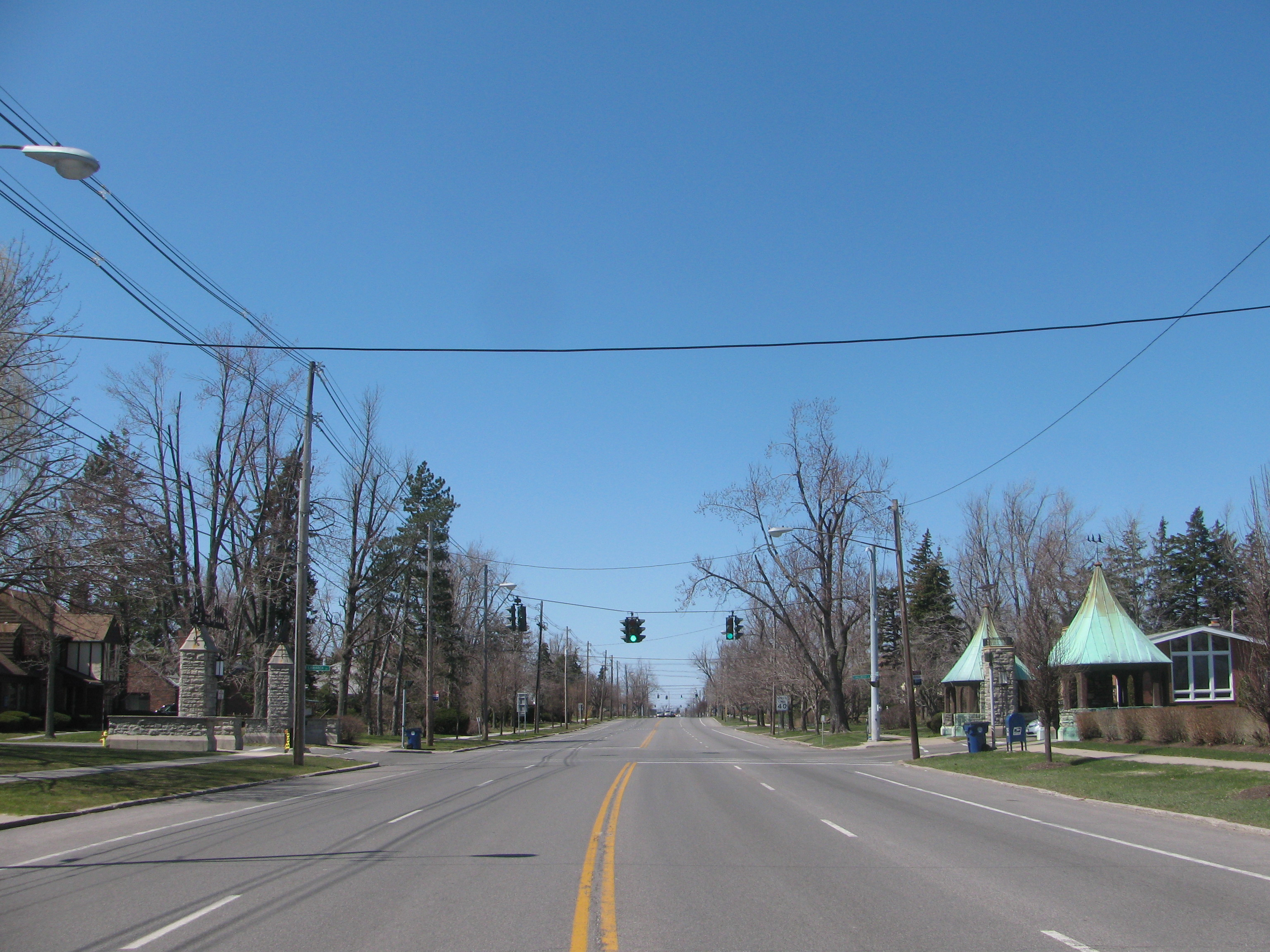
NY 5 heading past the Register of Historic Places-listed Entranceways at Main Street at Lamarck Drive and Smallwood Drive in Snyder

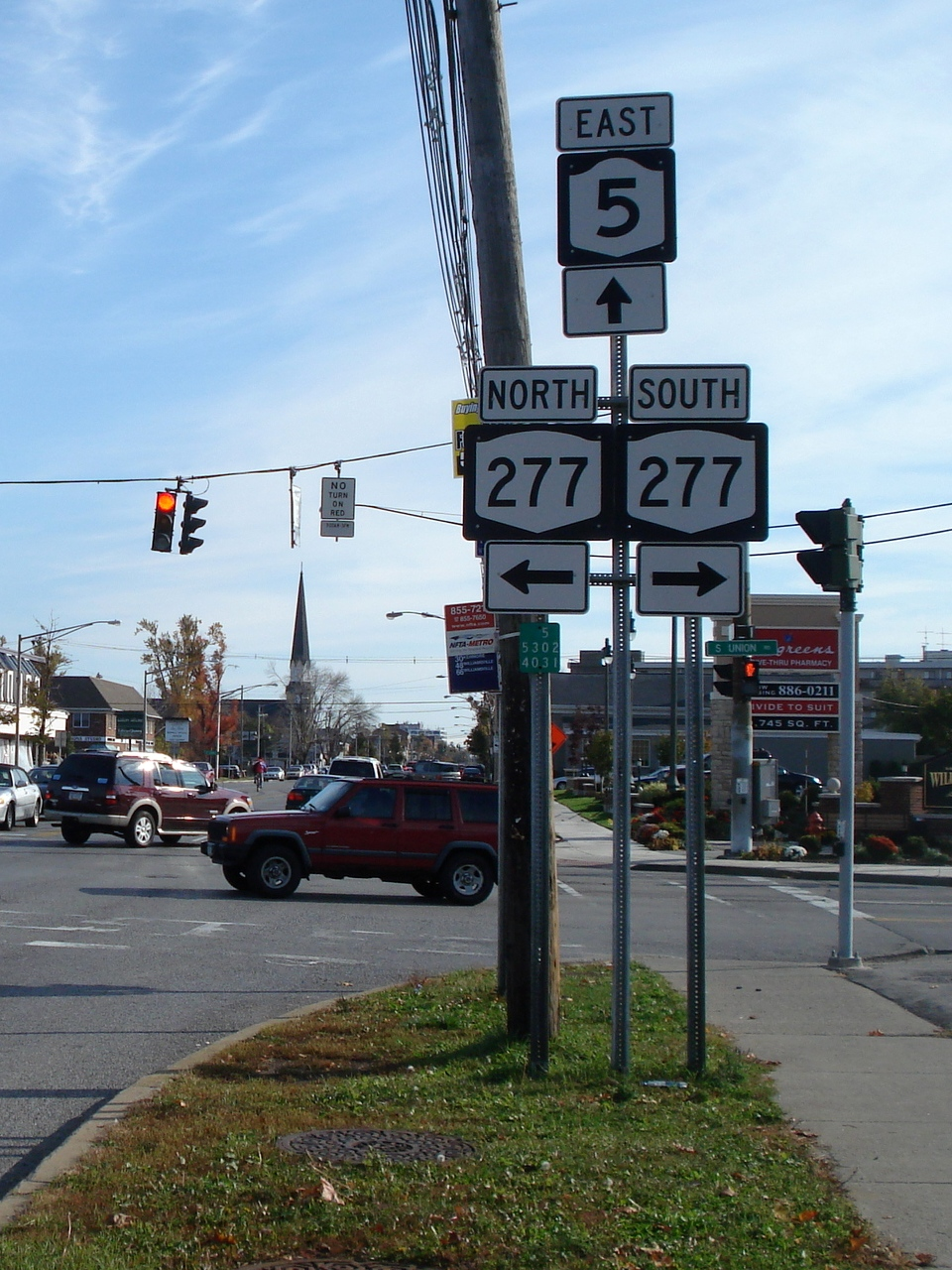
EB NY 5 at its junction with NY 277 near Williamsville.

The route continues along Main Street throughout the remainder of its length in Buffalo, cutting through the city diagonally from southwest to northeast until it enters the town of Amherst at the intersection of Bailey Avenue (US 62) at the south campus of the University at Buffalo.

=== Buffalo to Avon ===
Once leaving the city of Buffalo, NY 5 heads east through the densely populated suburban town of Amherst, including the hamlets of Snyder and Eggertsville and the village of Williamsville and is heavily developed through the entire length of the town, particularly at the intersection with Transit Road (NY 78). In the town of Clarence, the road dips into a significant depression known as Clarence Hollow. Once leaving Clarence, NY 5 goes through predominantly rural areas until reaching the city of Batavia in Genesee County, closely paralleling the New York State Thruway through much of the county. The road travels eastward until reaching Livingston County and the village of Caledonia.

NY 5 heads southeast from the village of Caledonia, paralleling the former right-of-way of an Erie–Lackawanna Railroad branch line that connected the villages of Caledonia and Avon as it heads through spacious fields containing little more than farmland. At a rural intersection controlled by single-head flashing traffic signals west of Avon, NY 5 meets US 20 for the second time. The routes embark on a second concurrency, merging onto the right-of-way of NY 5 as they cross the Genesee River and enter both the town and village of Avon.

=== Avon to Ontario County ===
US 20 and NY 5 become West Main Street upon entering the village, underscoring the road's status as the primary east–west highway through the town. The route continues southeast from the Genesee, passing through the forested but sparsely populated western area of the village. As the route approaches the Livonia, Avon and Lakeville Railroad (LAL) grade crossing, the number of homes increases rapidly, only to be replaced by businesses in the area surrounding the LAL mainline. Located on the western edge of this transition is NY 39, which terminates at this junction. Past the tracks, West Main intersects Rochester Street, a locally important north–south two-lane arterial that continues north of the village to the Rochester suburb of Brighton as East River Road. Shortly after this intersection, the homes return, following US 20 and NY 5 as West Main enters the heart of the village.

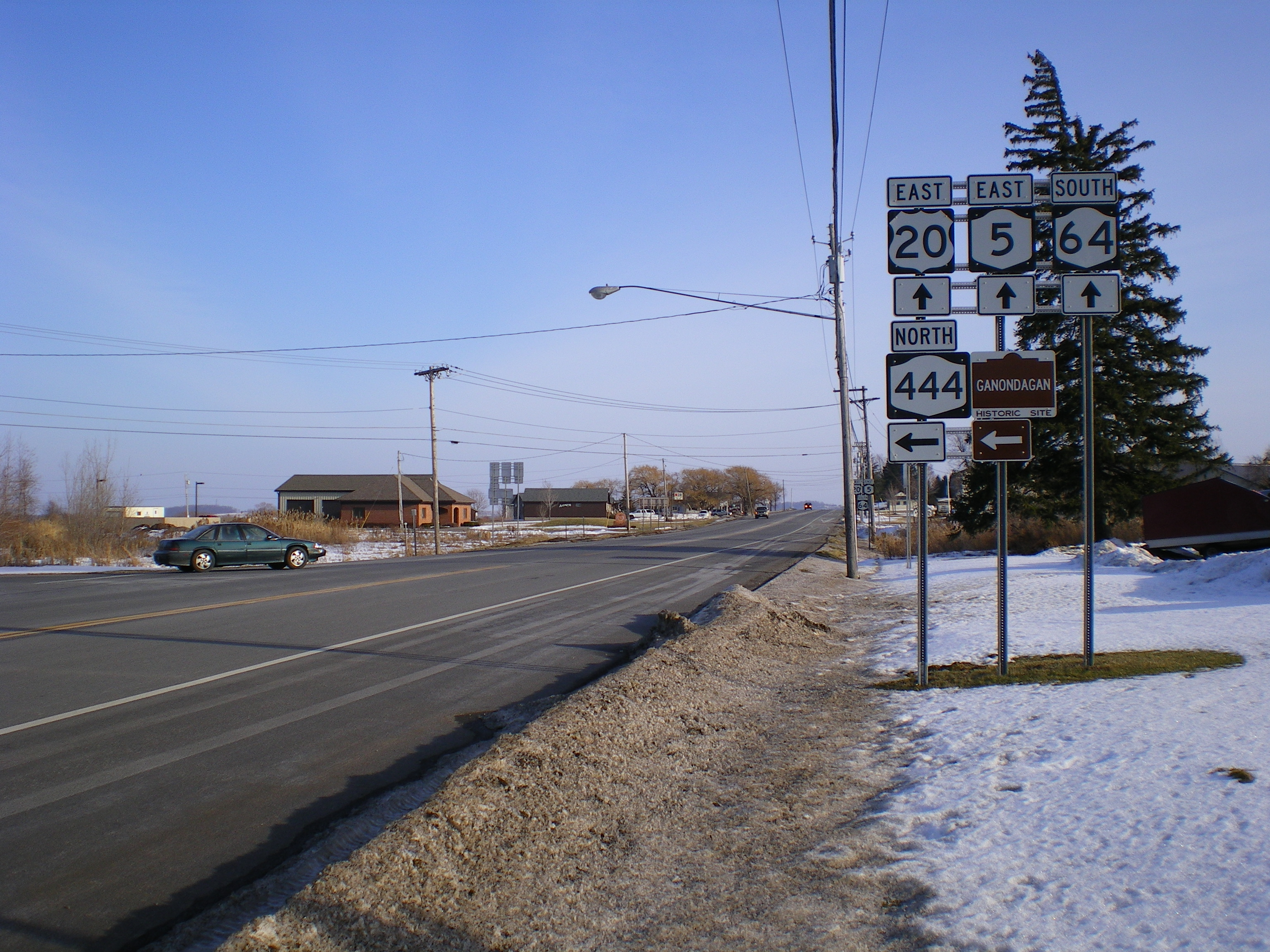
US 20 and NY 5 eastbound at NY 444 near Bloomfield

In the centre of Avon, West Main feeds into Park Place, a large traffic circle providing access to two local streets from US 20 and NY 5. The routes follow the circle counterclockwise, departing the roundabout on East Main Street. The street proceeds east, passing through four blocks of densely populated neighbourhoods before exiting the village and abruptly entering vast, barren fields to the east. US 20 and NY 5, now named Avon–Lima Road, intersects NY 15 two miles (3 km) to the east in East Avon, a community based around the intersection and the streets comprising it, and connects to I-390 at exit 10 a half-mile from NY 15. Continuing, the road intersects several county routes over the next four miles (6 km) before becoming West Main Street once more, this time for the village of Lima. At an intersection with NY 15A in the village centre, US 20 and NY 5 become East Main Street, retaining the name to the Ontario County line at Honeoye Creek.

=== Western Ontario County ===
In the town of West Bloomfield, US 20 and NY 5 go unnamed as they proceed eastward. Roughly one mile from the county line in the hamlet of West Bloomfield, US 20 and NY 5 meet the southern terminus of NY 65. Exiting the hamlet, US 20 and NY 5 head through another area dominated by open land, intersecting Elton Road before passing seamlessly into East Bloomfield. A mile and a half from the town line, US 20 and NY 5 intersect NY 64, a road running northwest–southeast from the Monroe County line south to US 20 and NY 5. NY 64, whose right-of-way ends at US 20 and NY 5 at the foot of a small hill, joins the two routes eastward on a triple overlap, entering the village of Bloomfield and intersecting the southern terminus of NY 444 south of the portion of Bloomfield once known as Holcomb. Near the junction with NY 444, US 20, NY 5 and NY 64 take-ups on a due east alignment, absorbing the routing used by Gauss Road west of this point.

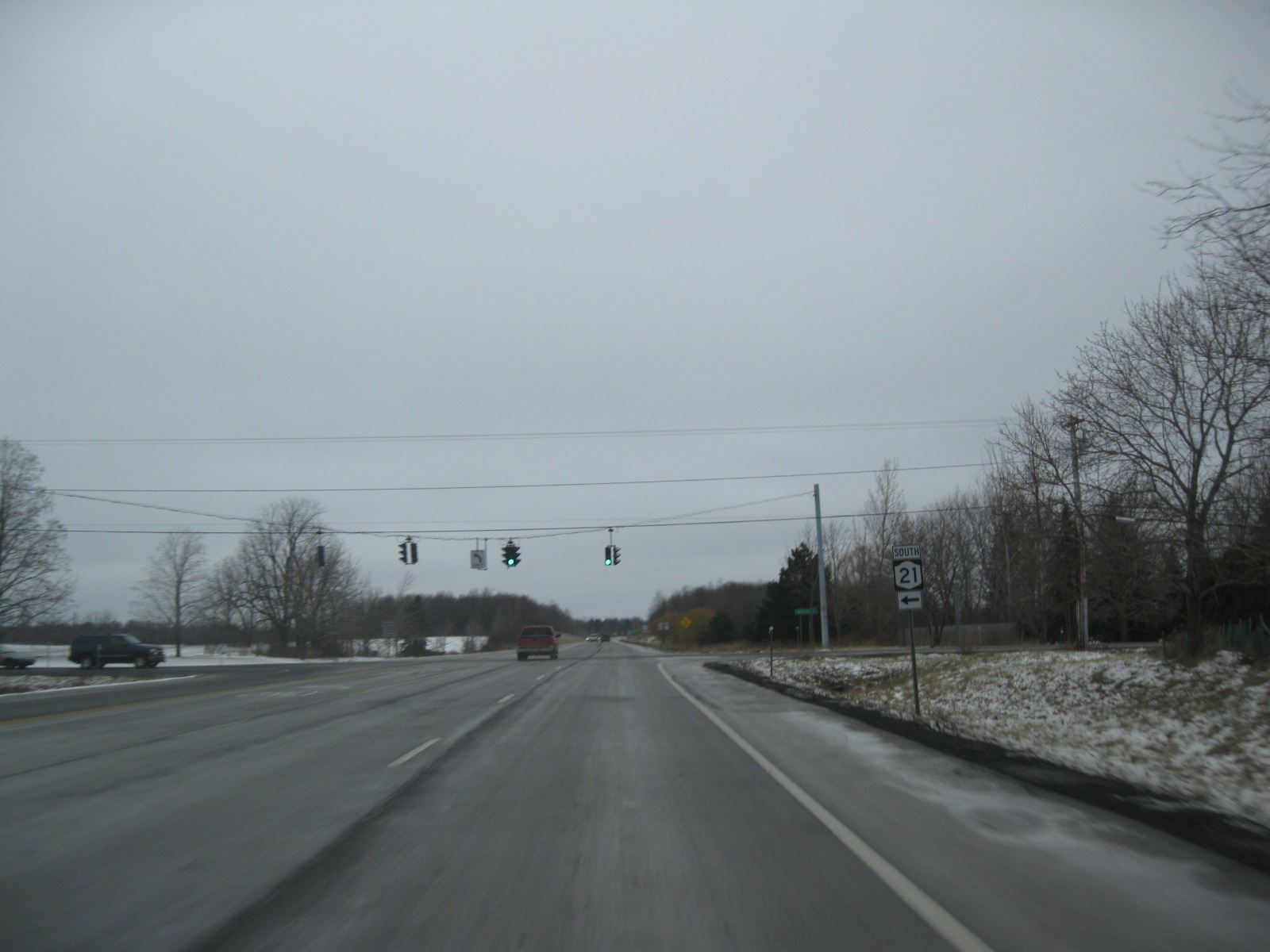
West end of the NY 21 overlaps as seen from US 20 and NY 5 westbound

A mile to the east at Whalen Road, NY 64 separates from US 20 and NY 5, following the road, and US 20A, which has its eastern terminus at this intersection, south toward Bristol. US 20 and NY 5 continue through rural Ontario County before splitting from its easterly alignment at an intersection four miles (6 km) east of US 20A and NY 64 in the town of Canandaigua. West Avenue, the former routing of US 20 and NY 5 into downtown Canandaigua, continues east from the junction while US 20 and NY 5 turn south onto a bypass around Canandaigua.

==== Canandaigua area ====
Half a mile from the start of the bypass and a short distance before the arterial makes a turn eastward to traverse Canandaigua Lake to the southeast, US 20 and NY 5 meets NY 21 at a four-way intersection. Like US 20 and NY 5, NY 21 once continued directly into downtown, in this instance via Bristol Street to the east of the junction, but now follows US 20 and NY 5 along the east–west leg of the bypass. Past Bristol Street, the bypass widens from two to four lanes and, after meeting two local streets, enters the city of Canandaigua as the limited-access Western Boulevard, albeit with no exits. The route loses this distinction before intersecting South Main Street, where US 20, NY 5 and NY 21 meet the southern terminus of NY 332. NY 21 departs the bypass, following NY 332 into downtown, while US 20 and NY 5 continue onto the four-lane, median separated Eastern Boulevard, the original section of the US 20 and NY 5 bypasses of Canandaigua. The roadway acts a centre of commerce for the city, sporting restaurants, hotels, and supermarkets along its length within the city limits.

Upon exiting the city, the establishments become a pair of shopping plazas centred around the intersection with the northern terminus of NY 364. Across the town line in Hopewell a quarter-mile to the east, a third plaza, anchored by Runnings, formerly a Walmart, dominates the northeast corner of CR 10 and Eastern Boulevard. On the adjacent parcel is another plaza containing the current Walmart. At the entrance to the second plaza, US 20 and NY 5 intersect Lakeshore Drive, the former routing of US 20 and NY 5 to the south of the bypass. Past the junction, the divided highway comes to an end and, after another half-mile, narrows to two lanes.

=== Canandaigua to Auburn ===
Deeper into Hopewell, the area surrounding US 20 and NY 5 become rural once more. Roughly 1.5 miles (2.4 km) from the end of the bypass, US 20 and NY 5 meet NY 247. After 10.3 miles (16.6 km) of eastward progression through open land, the routes meet the northern terminus of both NY 14A and NY 245, concurrent at this location, in the town of Geneva. A half-mile past NY 14A and NY 245, US 20 and NY 5 enter the city of Geneva and widens into a four-lane road. In the city, US 20 and NY 5 intersect NY 14 by way of a pseudo-interchange on the bank of Seneca Lake. US 20 and NY 5 turns into a divided highway again at this point. At the interchange, NY 14 Truck joins US 20 and NY 5, bypassing a sharp turn on NY 14 downtown. US 20 and NY 5 continues as a divided highway around the northern tip of Seneca Lake, crossing the Preemption Line and entering Seneca County at its midpoint. A mile to the east in East Geneva, just east of a railroad underpass, US 20 and NY 5 meet the northern terminus of NY 96A at a former trumpet interchange that has been converted to an intersection with a traffic signal.

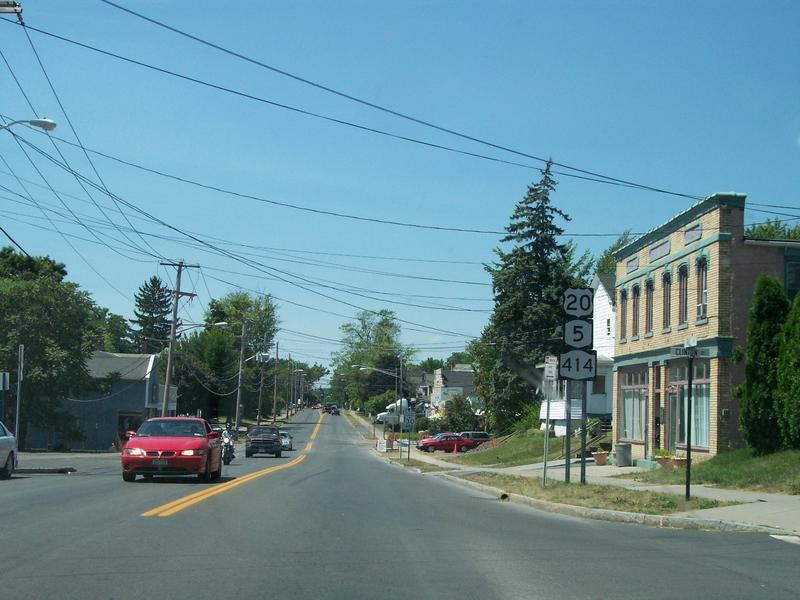
US 20, NY 5 and NY 414 in Seneca Falls

From NY 96A east to the village of Waterloo, a distance of roughly four miles, US 20 and NY 5 become a two-lane road and run parallel to the Cayuga–Seneca Canal. In Waterloo, the concurrency meets NY 96 in the village centre. East of the village, the distance between the canal and the roadway decreases, making US 20 and NY 5 the closest road to the water for the next one and a half miles to NY 414 in the town of Seneca Falls. NY 414 joins US 20 and NY 5, overlapping the road for 4.3 miles (6.9 km) into the hamlet of Seneca Falls. At Cayuga Street, NY 414 turns south, crossing the water body that is the canal and the Seneca River and becoming Ovid Street while US 20 and NY 5 turn north onto Cayuga, following the street around the small Van Cleef Lake, through the Finger Lakes Railway grade crossing, and exiting the hamlet. Three miles from NY 414, just west of Montezuma National Wildlife Refuge, US 20 and NY 5 meet NY 318 and NY 89 at intersections just 0.1 miles (0.16 km) apart. The intersection with NY 89 has a traffic signal.

About three miles (5 km) later, after entering Cayuga County over the Seneca River/Cayuga and Seneca Canal, just north of Cayuga Lake, the two routes meet NY 90 in the town of Aurelius, at a traffic signal. A few miles east of that intersection, the highway meets the Finger Lakes Railway again but crosses it via an overpass. The routes continue eastward through Aurelius to the city of Auburn where it turns into a divided four-lane highway again. On the western edge of the city, just after passing Finger Lakes Mall, US 20 and NY 5 meet the eastern terminus of NY 326, which is also a four-lane divided highway for a short stretch. In downtown Auburn, US 20 and NY 5's east and west lanes split apart from each other for a short distance as an arterial over the alignments of Clark Street, Franklin Street, and Grant Avenue. The arterial runs concurrent with NY 38 for 0.2 miles (0.3 km). NY 38 then splits from the concurrency and joins NY 34. A quarter-mile to the east, US 20 separates from NY 5 at the northern terminus of NY 38A. NY 5 continues after the split as the four-lane Grant Avenue passing by a high number of shopping areas.

=== Auburn to Syracuse ===
From NY 174 in Camillus to Fairmount, NY 5 is a 5-mile (8 km) limited-access highway traversing the western suburbs of Syracuse. At one time, the highway was to be extended to West Street in Syracuse, via the current Grand Avenue. The freeway has partial access to NY 173 from westbound NY 5. East of NY 173, the freeway connects to NY 695 at a directional T interchange and passes over NY 297 without access. East of Fairmount, NY 5 alters to the south before turning east onto West Genesee Street and converting to grade-level intersections.

In Syracuse, NY 5 is parallel to I-690 for much of its routing but never encounters the highway, thus making the north–south streets that intersect NY 5 entry points to and from I-690. In downtown Syracuse, West Genesee Street becomes James Street. At the southern tip of the interchange between I-690 and I-81, NY 5 transfers onto Erie Boulevard and intersects State Street (US 11), but passes under I-81 without access. From the downtown area to DeWitt, NY 5 is divided. At the Syracuse–DeWitt boundary, NY 5 intersects NY 635 and eastward, it curves to a southeast course. Near the former Shoppingtown Mall, NY 5 turns east onto Genesee Street to begin an overlap with NY 92. Less than a mile east of the mall, NY 5 and NY 92 intersect I-481 at a cloverleaf interchange.

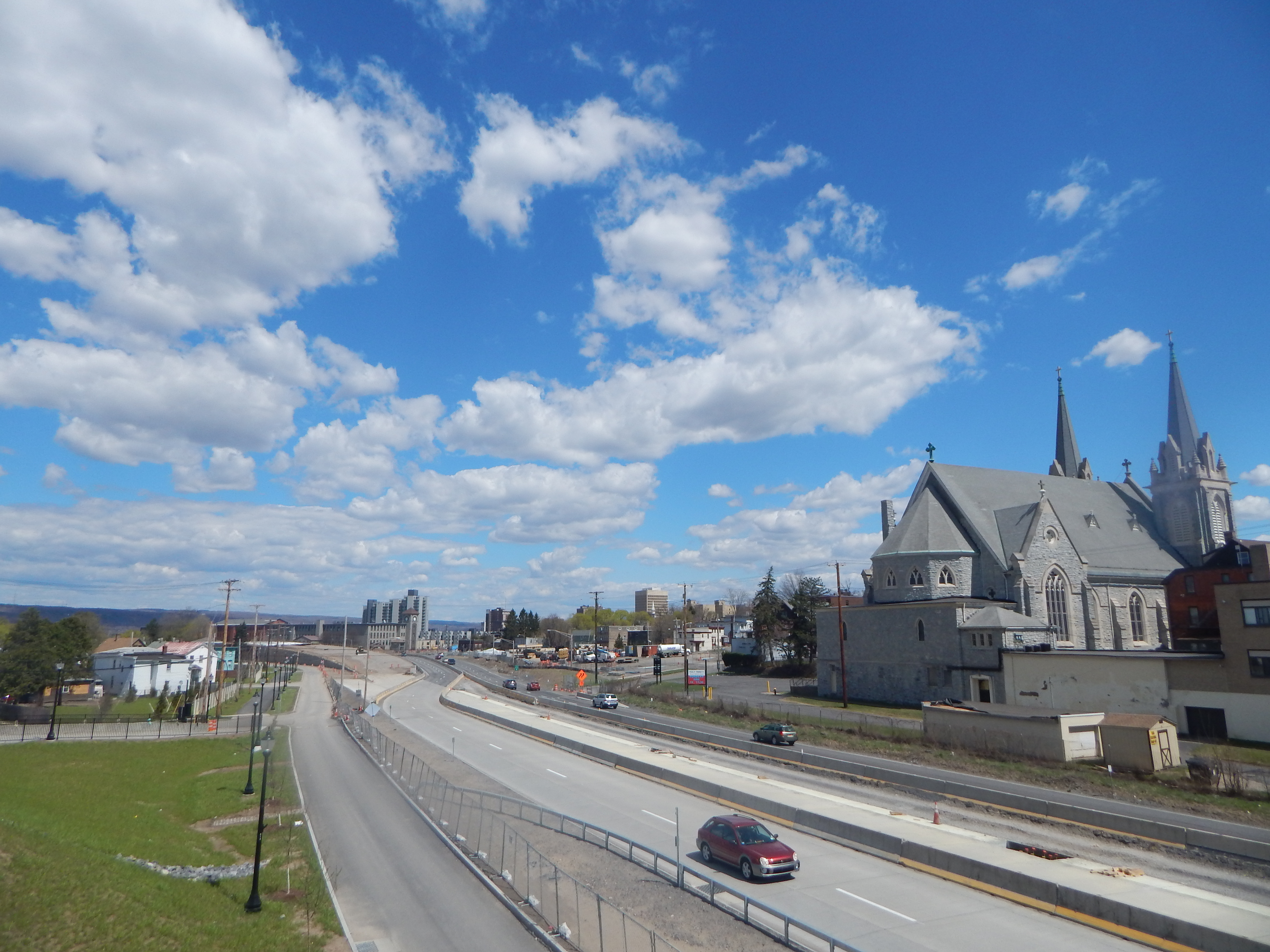
The Utica Arterial under construction in May 2015

=== Syracuse to Utica ===
NY 5 and NY 92 remain concurrent up to Highbridge Road, where NY 92 splits from NY 5 and heads southeast to Manlius. The segment of the overlap with NY 92 between I-481 and the eastern split is the busiest area of NY 5 in the Syracuse area and in all of Onondaga County. Past the split, NY 5 continues east through Onondaga and Madison counties, passing Fayetteville, Chittenango, and Canastota before entering the vicinity of Oneida. West of the city, NY 5 intersects NY 365A, a spur route of NY 365 leading directly into downtown. To the east, NY 5 (which forms the southern boundary of the city) meets NY 46 before crossing over Oneida Creek and into Oneida County.

Just past the county line in Oneida Castle, NY 5 intersects NY 365, a route leading northward to the New York State Thruway in Verona. NY 5 presses on, passing through the city of Sherrill and the village of Vernon (briefly overlapping NY 31) and the town of Westmoreland to the town of Kirkland, where NY 5 intersects NY 233, crosses over Oriskany Creek, and meets the western terminus of NY 5B. The spur of NY 5 later rejoins its parent yards from where NY 5A departs NY 5 to serve western Utica. NY 5 itself continues eastward through New Hartford, meeting NY 12B before merging with NY 12 at Genesee Street. Both routes continue eastward across the Sauquoit Creek into Utica.

=== Utica to Albany ===
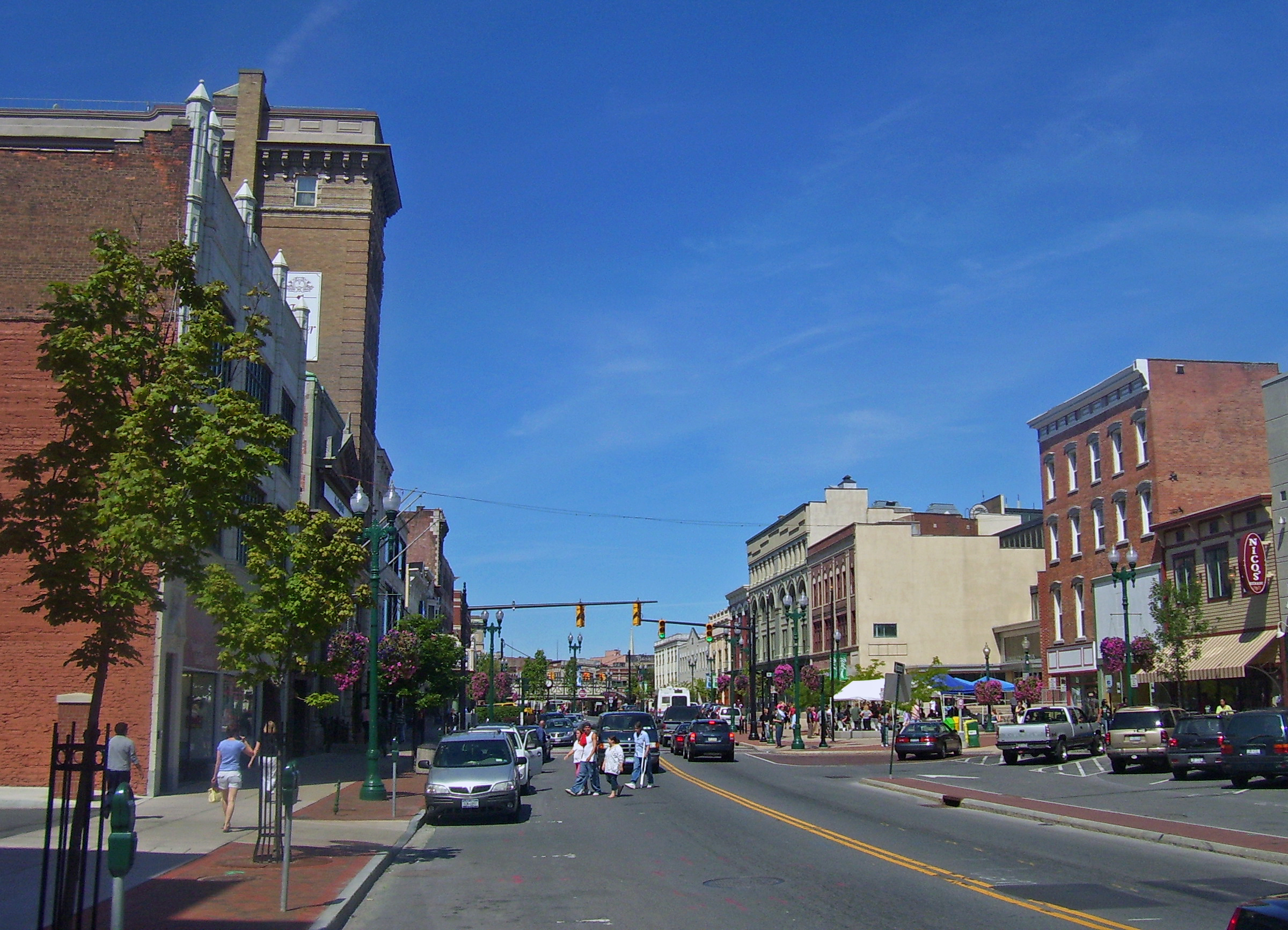
State Street in downtown Schenectady

NY 5 enters the city of Utica on a concurrency with NY 12 heading in a northeast direction. It shortly picks up NY 8, and all three cross the city together. NY 5 also intersects with the terminus of NY 840 at this point. Just south of the New York State Thruway, I-790 begins as a short expressway, also including NY 5, NY 8, and NY 12. After crossing out of the city, they meet the Thruway, with NY 8 and 12 continuing northeast, while I-790 and NY 5 turns to the east-south-east, picking up the tail-end of NY 49. These three, still as an expressway, straddle each side of the Thruway for a short way, with I-790 technically ending at the ramps for I-90. NY 5 continues to the end of the expressway, only a few hundred feet later, dropping to Leland Avenue. A few hundred feet to the north of the Thruway, NY 5 turns eastward again to continue down Herkimer Road. It closely parallels the Thruway to Herkimer, where NY 5 moves slightly northward through the centre of the village, becoming State Street, while I-90 crosses the Erie Canal and goes south for a short distance. There is a short concurrency with NY 28 in the village.

After exiting Herkimer, NY 5 continues east, closely paralleling this time the canal, through the city of Little Falls as Main Street, where two more concurrencies occur, with NY 167 and NY 169. NY 5 continues to parallel the canal, and in some instances again, the Thruway, through Amsterdam, becoming Amsterdam Road all the way to Scotia, where it crosses the canal into Schenectady as Mohawk Avenue, turning into State Street upon entering the city limits. It continues fairly straight on a southeast course into Albany as Central Avenue until it reaches Townsend Park. At this point, NY 5 turns into Washington Avenue and all signage referring to NY 5 ceases. The New York State Department of Transportation recognizes the route, however, as it continues down Washington Ave past the New York State Capitol building, turning south for a short distance as Eagle Street. NY 5 then continues east on State Street to Broadway, where it again turns south-east shortly before returning east on a small spur of Broadway, travelling underneath US 9 and I-787. NY 5 ends at the Hudson River.

== History ==
=== Early roads ===
Soon after the end of the American Revolution in 1783, a surge of westward migration into Central and Western New York began. At the time, most travel west of the Albany area was by water. While rudimentary roads were laid out following the Mohawk River, there were no major land routes west of Fort Schuyler (present-day Utica), except for an old east–west Iroquois trail that was a simple footpath. By the late 1780s, many companies began to set up their operations in the new settlements in the Central and Western New York. As a result, there was a clamour for the building of the main road running west from Utica.

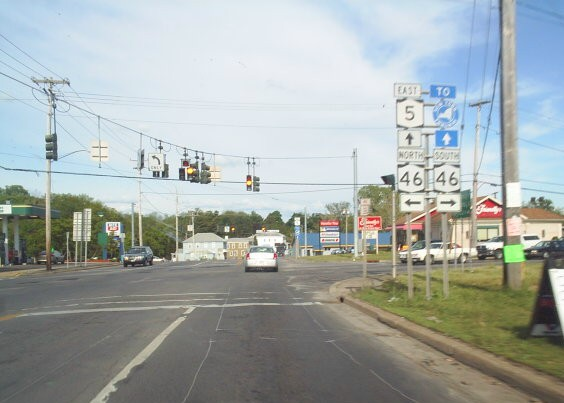
Junction of NY 5 and NY 46 in Oneida

On March 22, 1794, the New York State Legislature passed a law calling for the laying out and improvement of a public road from old Fort Schuyler on the Mohawk River to the settlement of Canawaugus on the Genesee River, in as straight a line as the topography of the land would allow. This road was officially known as the "Great Genesee Road" and is one of the earliest state roads in New York, intended to provide access to the New Military Tract. As planned, it generally followed the old Iroquois trail through Oneida, Manlius, Onondaga Valley (south of modern Syracuse), Skaneateles, Auburn, Seneca Falls, Geneva, and Canandaigua before ending at the Genesee River. Four years later, another legislative act authorized the extension of the Genesee Road to Buffalo.

By the end of the 18th century, while the Genesee Road had been greatly improved and saw heavy traffic, many portions were still substandard and some sections had still not been completed. Partly because of this, and also because of the success of the Lancaster Turnpike in Pennsylvania, the state outsourced the task of improving and maintaining the Genesee Road to a private company. On April 1, 1800, the Seneca Road Company was chartered for this purpose and the portion of the Genesee Road from Utica to Canandaigua was improved and operated as a toll road known as the Seneca Turnpike, which was 157 miles (253 km) long and, at the time, the longest turnpike in the state. Three days later, the old road following the Mohawk River between Utica and Schenectady also became a turnpike, known as the Mohawk Turnpike.

With the road leading from Albany northwest to Schenectady having been already established as a turnpike (the Albany and Schenectady Turnpike) in 1797, an all-turnpike route over good quality roads was now available from Albany to Canandaigua. The western extension of the Genesee Road to Buffalo soon followed suit and also became an improved Macadam toll road, the Ontario and Genesee Turnpike, in 1805. The Seneca Road Company was authorized to create a more northerly alternate route of the Seneca Turnpike in 1806. This branch left the original turnpike east of Seneca Falls and crossed more level terrain through Elbridge, Geddes, and Fayetteville before rejoining the old path at Chittenango. As the city of Syracuse developed, traffic patterns changed and the northern branch route became more heavily used than the original road.

The construction and opening of the Erie Canal in 1825 along the same alignment as the Albany to Buffalo route began to eat away at the revenues of these turnpike companies. In time, the turnpike business had become unprofitable and the companies were dissolved by 1852, causing the roads to revert to public control. The Seneca Road Company dissolved in 1852. The old, southern path of the Seneca Turnpike is now Franklin Street and Old Seneca Turnpike from Auburn to Marcellus, NY 175 between Marcellus and Onondaga Hill, and NY 173 from there east to Chittenango.

=== Designation ===
The improvement of the road from Buffalo southwest to Pennsylvania in the mid-19th century soon allowed for continuous travel across the entire state of New York. With the advent of the automobile, the state began to take over and pave major thoroughfares at the beginning of the 20th century. In 1908, the state legislature created a statewide system of unsigned legislative routes. One of the routes assigned at this time was Route 6, an Albany–Buffalo highway that followed the path of the Genesee Road and the Seneca Turnpike from Buffalo to Utica, the Mohawk Turnpike between Utica and Schenectady, and the Albany and Schenectady Turnpike from Schenectady to Albany. From Auburn to Chittenango, Route 6 utilized most of the newer, northern branch of the Seneca Turnpike.

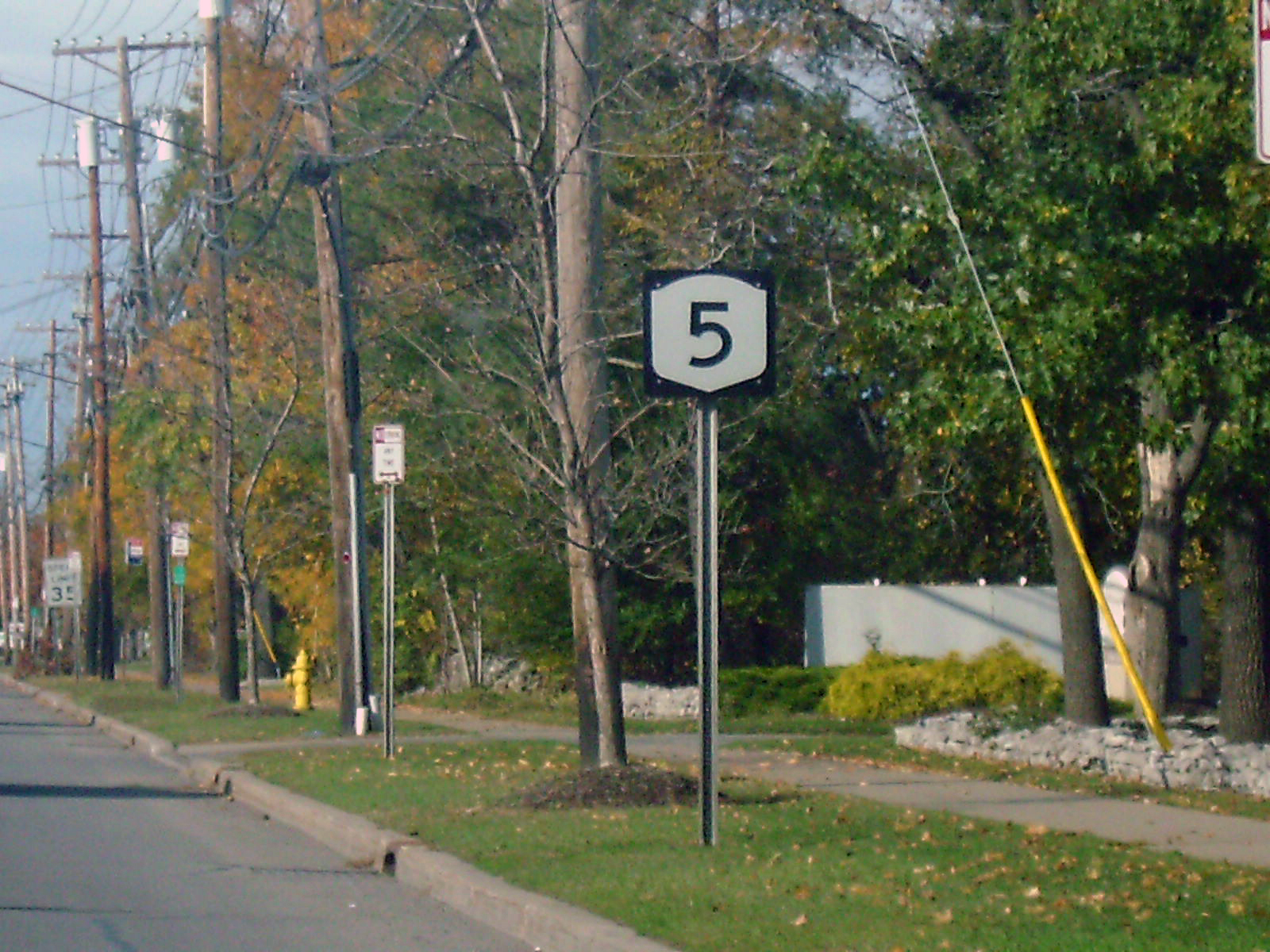
Reassurance marker on NY 5 in Williamsville

The automobile allowed people to quickly travel long distances and a way to mark routes became needed. One early means of marking routes was the establishment of various auto trail associations in the 1910s. These associations selected good quality roads and marked them with symbols or colors on telephone poles. Most of legislative Route 6 eventually became part of the Yellowstone Trail, a cross-country auto trail established in 1912 that ran from Washington to Massachusetts. In New York, the trail used modern US 20 from Pennsylvania to Silver Creek, most of modern NY 5 from Silver Creek to Albany, and modern US 20 again from Albany to Massachusetts.

In 1924, following what other states did, New York began to assign route numbers to its main thoroughfares. The Albany to Buffalo portion of the Yellowstone Trail, which ran through the cities of Syracuse and Utica, was assigned the number NY 5A. The portion of the Yellowstone Trail southwest of Buffalo and east of Albany became part of NY 5, which bypassed Syracuse and Utica to the south. The Buffalo to Albany portion of NY 5's original alignment used a new road, Broadway Road, from Buffalo to Avon and the old Cherry Valley Turnpike alignment from Skaneateles to Albany. In between Avon and Skaneateles, NY 5 and NY 5A overlapped.

By 1926, however, the Buffalo to Albany section of NY 5 was relocated onto the Genesee Road alignment, replacing NY 5A. NY 5's former, more southerly alignment was redesignated as NY 7. In 1927, the establishment of the U.S. Highway System created more numbering changes. US 20, which mainly followed the Yellowstone Trail elsewhere in the country, was designated in New York along NY 5 southwest of Hamburg and east of Albany and along old NY 7 from Skaneateles to Albany. Between the towns of Hamburg and Avon, the new US 20 used an even more southerly alignment, running via East Aurora and Warsaw. This truncated both ends of NY 5 to Athol Springs (south of Buffalo in the town of Hamburg) in the west, and to Albany in the east.

In the 1930 state highway renumbering, NY 5 was truncated even further to begin in downtown Buffalo. The portion between Buffalo and Athol Springs was assigned as part of NY 62. Southwest of Buffalo, Southwestern Boulevard, an alternate route of US 20 between Irving and Big Tree (east of Athol Springs) became NY 20B. Farther southwest, another alternate route of US 20 between the Pennsylvania line and Silver Creek, running along the shore of Lake Erie, was designated as NY 20A. The NY 20A and NY 20B designations proved to be short-lived. US 62 was extended into New York c. 1932, causing NY 62 to be renumbered. Around the same time, US 20 was realigned to follow NY 20B from Irving to Big Tree. NY 5 was extended along part of old NY 62 to Athol Springs, from where it continued to the Pennsylvania state line by way of US 20's old routing to Irving and all of NY 20A.

=== Expressway relocations ===
Originally, NY 5 entered Buffalo from the south on Fuhrmann Boulevard and Michigan Avenue and followed South Park Avenue and Main Street through the city before rejoining its modern alignment at Goodell Street. In the mid-1950s, a new limited-access highway was constructed along Fuhrmann Boulevard from Lackawanna to the Buffalo River. At the river, the new roadway broke from Fuhrmann and continued directly into downtown, returning to grade level two blocks south of Niagara Square. The expressway, known as the Buffalo Skyway, became part of a rerouted NY 5 by 1956. Visually, the Skyway cuts off the city from the Buffalo inner harbor. In 2008 there was momentum to tear it down, but the momentum passed. In 2019 a plan to remove part of the Skyway and close the rest to motorized traffic was proposed as part of a competition. This plan has drawn strong opinions both for and against the removal.

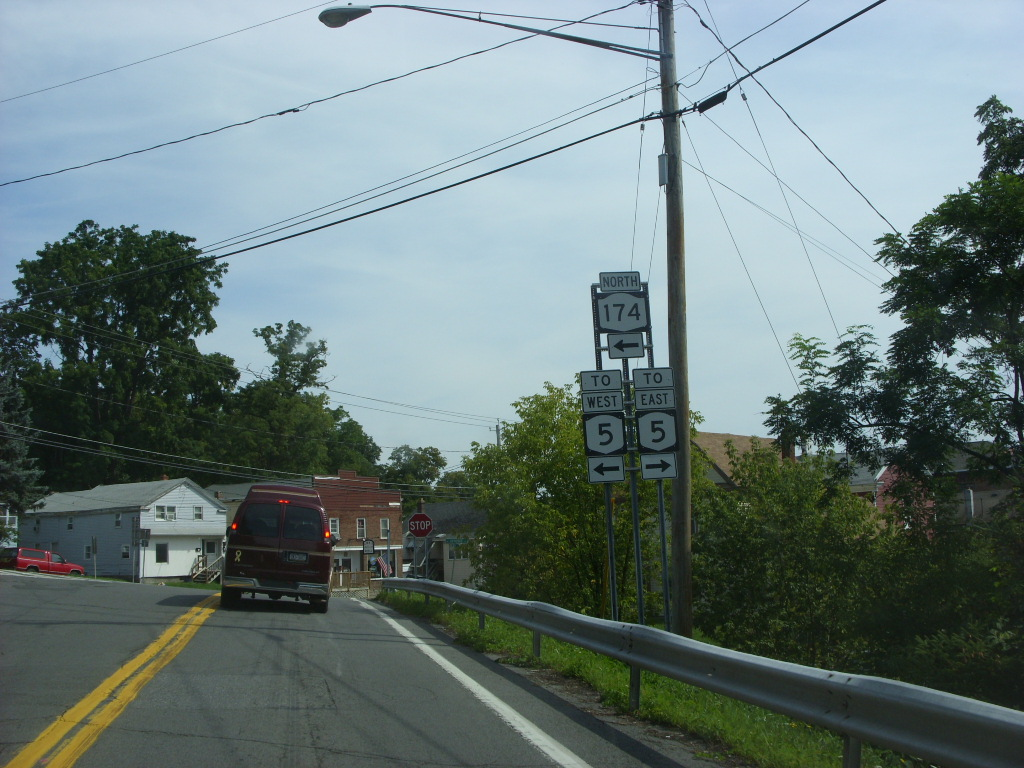
Approaching Genesee Street on NY 174 northbound in Camillus. Until the Camillus Bypass was constructed, NY 5 followed Genesee Street and NY 174 ended at this junction.

Farther east in Utica, construction began in the early 1950s on a new arterial highway—known as the North–South Arterial—through the city center. The new roadway bypassed NY 5, which was initially routed on Genesee Street and Herkimer Road through Utica. The first portion of the highway to open was the segment north of River Road, which was completed by 1956. It was extended southward to Oriskany Street (NY 5A) by 1961 and completed entirely by 1964, at which time it became part of a rerouted NY 5 and NY 12. Two portions of Genesee Street, from NY 12 in New Hartford to the Utica city line and from NY 5S to Herkimer Road in Utica, remain state maintained to this day as unsigned NY 921E and NY 921C, respectively.

In the Syracuse suburbs of Camillus and Geddes, NY 5 was initially routed on West Genesee Street between the villages of Camillus and Solvay. Construction on a bypass of this segment of NY 5 began in the early 1970s and was completed between NY 695 and Genesee Street by 1977. By the following year, the freeway was open to traffic up to Hinsdale Road; however, NY 5 remained on Genesee Street between Hinsdale and the Solvay village limits. The remainder of the Camillus Bypass was completed c. 1979, at which time NY 5 was realigned to follow the freeway. Genesee Street is now largely maintained by Onondaga County as CR 98; however, two portions of the street remain state maintained. Near the western end of the expressway, the former routing of NY 5 became part of an extended NY 174. Between the Camillus town line and the eastern end of the bypass, Genesee Street is unsigned NY 930W. This particular expressway was meant to link Downtown Syracuse to Auburn, but was never completed past Camillus or Fairmount. Several incomplete ramps mark both ends of this expressway section.

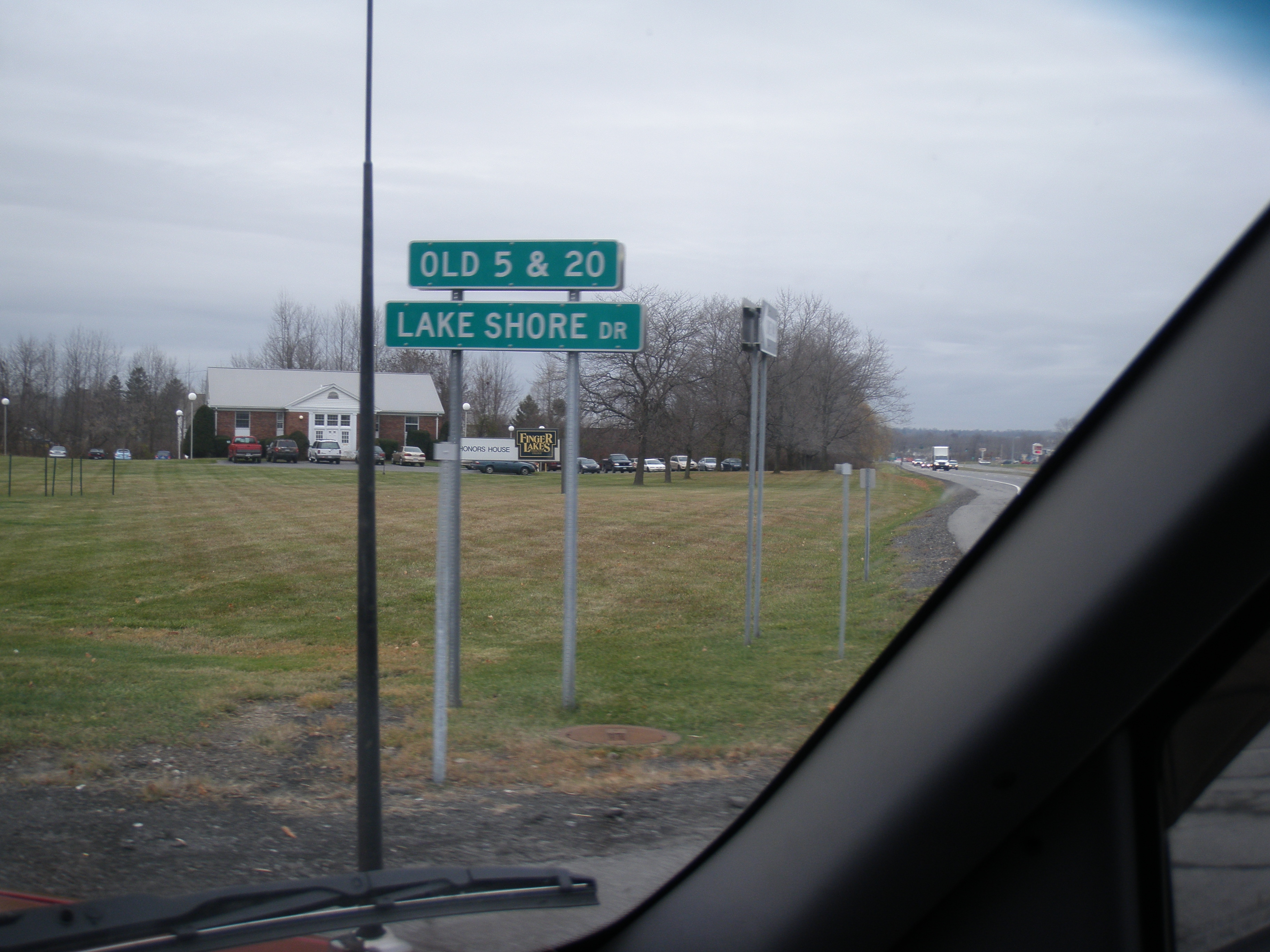
Lakeshore Drive in Canandaigua

Smaller realignments also took place in other cities along the route. In Canandaigua, NY 5 originally entered the city on West Avenue and followed South Main Street and Lakeshore Drive through the city limits before rejoining its current routing in Hopewell. In the mid-1950s, a new bypass was built north of Lakeshore Drive from South Main Street to Hopewell. It became part of a realigned NY 5 by 1956. The remainder of the bypass around the southwestern extents of the city was built in the late 1970s and early 1980s. The former routing of NY 5 on South Main Street remains state maintained as NY 942T; until 1996, the portion of West Avenue between the west end of the bypass and the Canandaigua city line was maintained by the New York State Department of Transportation (NYSDOT) as NY 942W. Even though maintenance of the road had been transferred to the town of Canandaigua in 1996, the designation remained in NYSDOT documents until 2007.

In Geneva, NY 5 was initially routed on East North Street and Border City Road, overlapping NY 14 through the city and rejoining its modern routing in East Geneva. The overlap was eliminated c. 1931 when NY 5 was moved onto a new roadway located along the edge of Seneca Lake. NY 5 was realigned again in the 1960s to use a new divided highway built midway between the lake shore road and Border City Road. Border City Road is now maintained by Seneca County as CR 110.

In April 2014 work began on a $68.3 million project to replace the viaduct over Columbia Street, Lafayette Streets, and Oriskany Boulevard (NY 5A and NY 5S) in Utica. The nearly one mile stretch had signalized at-grade intersections that had been causing safety concerns and some fatalities. In addition to the replacement of the viaduct, the alignment of the arterial was straightened, a new single point urban interchange was built at Court Street, and a pedestrian bridge was built across the roadway. The pedestrian bridge was opened by December 2014, and the remainder of the project was completed by October 2017.

== Major intersections ==
County	Location	mi	km	Destinations	Notes
Chautauqua	Town of Ripley	0.00	0.00	PA 5 west / LECT west / Great Lakes Seaway Trail – Erie	Continuation into Pennsylvania
Chautauqua	Town of Ripley	0.60	0.97	To I-90 / New York Thruway	Access via NY 950D
Chautauqua	Town of Ripley	2.35	3.78	NY 76 south – Ripley	Northern terminus of NY 76
Chautauqua	Town of Westfield	10.01	16.11	NY 394 east to I-90 / New York Thruway – Westfield	Western terminus of NY 394; hamlet of Barcelona
Chautauqua	City of Dunkirk	27.97	45.01	NY 60 south to I-90 / New York Thruway	Northern terminus of NY 60
Chautauqua	Town of Hanover	38.62	62.15	US 20 west	Western terminus of US 20 overlap
Chautauqua	Town of Hanover	40.55	65.26	To I-90 / New York Thruway – Buffalo, Erie	Hamlet of Irving
Erie	Town of Brant	41.42	66.66	US 20 east	Eastern terminus of US 20 overlap
Erie	Town of Brant	41.48	66.76	NY 438 south	Northern terminus of NY 438
Erie	Farnham	43.53	70.05	NY 249 east	Western terminus of NY 249
Erie	Town of Hamburg	61.34	98.72	NY 75 south – Hamburg	Hamlet of Athol Springs; northern terminus of NY 75
Erie	Town of Hamburg	62.20	100.10	NY 179 east (Mile Strip Expressway)	Western terminus of NY 179
Erie	Buffalo	69.04	111.11	I-190 / LECT to I-90 / New York Thruway	Exit 7 (I-190)
Erie	Buffalo	69.2	111.4	Delaware Avenue / Great Lakes Seaway Trail (NY 384)	
Erie	Buffalo	73.16	117.74	NY 198	
Erie	Buffalo–Amherst city/town line	76.06	122.41	US 62	
Erie	Amherst	77.67	125.00	NY 240	Hamlet of Snyder
Erie	Amherst	78.61	126.51	I-90 / New York Thruway / I-290 west – Albany	
Erie	Williamsville	79.19	127.44	NY 277	
Erie	Amherst–Clarence town line	82.22	132.32	NY 78 to I-90 / New York Thruway	
Erie	Clarence	84.77	136.42	NY 324 west	Eastern terminus of NY 324
Erie	Newstead	92.46	148.80	NY 93 west – Akron	Eastern terminus of NY 93
Genesee	Pembroke	97.44	156.81	NY 77 to I-90 / New York Thruway – Indian Falls, Corfu, Darien Lakes	
Genesee	Town of Batavia	107.78	173.46	NY 63 north – Oakfield	Western terminus of NY 63 overlap
Genesee	City of Batavia	108.56	174.71	NY 33 west / NY 98 to I-90 / New York Thruway	Western terminus of NY 33 overlap
Genesee	City of Batavia	108.80	175.10	NY 63 south	Eastern terminus of NY 63 overlap
Genesee	City of Batavia	110.03	177.08	NY 33 east	Eastern terminus of NY 33 overlap
Genesee	Stafford	114.74	184.66	NY 237 north	Southern terminus of NY 237; hamlet of Stafford
Genesee	Village of Le Roy	118.88	191.32	NY 19 to I-90 / New York Thruway / I-490	
Livingston	Village of Caledonia	125.64	202.20	NY 36 south	Western terminus of NY 36 overlap
Livingston	Village of Caledonia	126.03	202.83	NY 36 north – Mumford	Eastern terminus of NY 36 overlap
Livingston	Town of Caledonia	131.95	212.35	US 20 west – Buffalo	Western terminus of US 20 overlap; hamlet of Canawaugus
Livingston	Village of Avon	132.83	213.77	NY 39 west – Geneseo	Eastern terminus of NY 39
Livingston	Town of Avon	135.12	217.45	NY 15	Hamlet of East Avon
Livingston	Town of Avon	135.84	218.61	I-390 – Corning, Rochester	Exit 10 (I-390)
Livingston	Village of Lima	140.05	225.39	NY 15A (Lake Avenue)	
Ontario	West Bloomfield	143.88	231.55	NY 65 north / CR 37 south	Southern terminus of NY 65; hamlet of West Bloomfield
Ontario	East Bloomfield	148.77	239.42	NY 64 north – Mendon	Western terminus of NY 64 overlap
Ontario	East Bloomfield	150.56	242.30	NY 444 north – Downtown Bloomfield	Southern terminus of NY 444
Ontario	East Bloomfield	151.82	244.33	US 20A west / NY 64 south – Naples	Eastern terminus of NY 64 overlap; eastern terminus of US 20A
Ontario	Town of Canandaigua	156.60	252.02	NY 21 south – Naples	Western terminus of NY 21 overlap
Ontario	City of Canandaigua	158.26	254.69	NY 21 north / NY 332 north to I-90 / New York Thruway – Business District	Eastern terminus of NY 21 overlap; southern terminus of NY 332
Ontario	City of Canandaigua	158.26	254.69	South Main Street (NY 942T south)	Northern terminus of NY 942T; former routing of US 20 / NY 5
Ontario	Town of Canandaigua	159.50	256.69	NY 364 south – Canandaigua Lake Resort Area, CMAC	Northern terminus of NY 364
Ontario	Hopewell	161.54	259.97	NY 247 south – CMAC	Northern terminus of NY 247
Ontario	Town of Geneva	171.83	276.53	NY 14A south / NY 245 south – Penn Yan, Naples	Northern terminus of NY 14A and NY 245
Ontario	City of Geneva	173.45	279.14	NY 14 – Watkins Glen NY 14 Truck begins	Western terminus of NY 14 Truck overlap
Ontario	City of Geneva	174.13	280.24	NY 14 Truck north to I-90 / New York Thruway – Geneva	Eastern terminus of NY 14 Truck overlap
Seneca	Town of Waterloo	176.04	283.31	NY 96A south – Ovid, Ithaca	Hamlet of East Geneva; northern terminus of NY 96A
Seneca	Village of Waterloo	180.75	290.89	NY 96	
Seneca	Town of Seneca Falls	182.26	293.32	NY 414 north to I-90 / New York Thruway – Clyde	Western terminus of NY 414 overlap
Seneca	Town of Seneca Falls	184.39	296.75	NY 414 south (Ovid Street)	Eastern terminus of NY 414 overlap; hamlet of Seneca Falls
Seneca	Town of Seneca Falls	187.47	301.70	NY 318 west to I-90 / New York Thruway – Del Lago	Eastern terminus of NY 318
Seneca	Seneca Falls–Tyre town line	187.55	301.83	NY 89 – Ithaca, Savannah	
Cayuga	Montezuma	189.55	305.05	NY 90 – Montezuma, Cayuga	
Cayuga	Aurelius	197.64	318.07	NY 326 west – Union Springs	Eastern terminus of NY 326
Cayuga	Auburn	199.01	320.28	NY 38 north – Port Byron, Auburn Correctional Facility	Western terminus of NY 38 overlap
Cayuga	Auburn	199.17	320.53	NY 34 / NY 38 south – Weedsport, Ithaca, Moravia	Eastern terminus of NY 38 overlap
Cayuga	Auburn	199.44	320.97	US 20 east / NY 38A south – Skaneateles, Owasco	Eastern terminus of US 20 overlap; northern terminus of NY 38A
Onondaga	Town of Elbridge	207.07	333.25	Old Route 31B / CR 99 to I-90 / New York Thruway – Weedsport	Former eastern terminus of NY 31B
Onondaga	Village of Elbridge			Valley Drive	Former southern terminus of NY 31C
Onondaga	Village of Elbridge	209.13	336.56	NY 317 north – Jordan	Southern terminus of NY 317
Onondaga	Town of Camillus	213.43	343.48	NY 321 south – Marcellus, Skaneateles	Hamlet of Bennetts Corners; northern terminus of NY 321
Onondaga	Town of Camillus	215.48	346.78	NY 174 south – Camillus	Northern terminus of NY 174
Onondaga	Town of Camillus	215.48	346.78	Western end of freeway section	
Onondaga	Town of Camillus	216.80	348.91	Camillus-Warners Road – Camillus, Marcellus, Warners	Westbound exit and eastbound entrance
Onondaga	Town of Camillus	218.82	352.16	Milton Avenue / Township Boulevard / Hinsdale Road	
Onondaga	Town of Camillus	220.46	354.80	NY 173 to NY 297 – Amboy, Solvay	Westbound exit and entrance
Onondaga	Town of Camillus	220.62	355.05	NY 695 north to I-690 – Fairgrounds, Syracuse	Southern terminus of NY 695
Onondaga	Town of Geddes	221.81	356.97	Eastern end of freeway section	
Onondaga	Town of Geddes	221.81	356.97	Genesee Street (NY 930W west) – Fairmount	Former routing of NY 5; eastern terminus of NY 930W; hamlet of Westvale
Onondaga	Syracuse	225.99	363.70	US 11 to I-81 BL / I-90 / New York Thruway	
Onondaga	Syracuse	228.23	367.30	NY 598 north (South Midler Avenue) to I-690	Southern terminus of NY 598
Onondaga	Syracuse	229.33	369.07	NY 635 north (Thompson Road) to I-90 / New York Thruway / I-690	Southern terminus of NY 635
Onondaga	Town of DeWitt	230.10	370.31	Bridge Street (NY 930P north) to I-81 / I-690	Southern terminus of NY 930P
Onondaga	Town of DeWitt	231.19	372.06	NY 92 west – Syracuse	Western terminus of NY 92 overlap; community of De Witt
Onondaga	Town of DeWitt	231.52	372.60	I-81 to I-90 / New York Thruway – Jamesville, Syracuse	Exit 86 (I-81)
Onondaga	Town of DeWitt	232.33	373.90	NY 92 east – Manlius, Cazenovia	Eastern terminus of NY 92 overlap
Onondaga	Fayetteville	234.39	377.21	NY 257 – Manlius	
Onondaga	Town of Manlius	238.46	383.76	NY 290 west	Eastern terminus of NY 290
Madison	Chittenango	241.70	388.98	NY 173 west – Manlius	Eastern terminus of NY 173
Madison	Chittenango	241.87	389.25	NY 13 south – Cazenovia	Western terminus of NY 13 overlap
Madison	Canastota	248.44	399.83	NY 13 north (South Peterboro Street) to I-90 / New York Thruway – Canastota	Eastern terminus of NY 13 overlap
Madison	Oneida	251.59	404.89	NY 365A east – Downtown Oneida	Western terminus of NY 365A
Madison	Oneida	254.07	408.89	NY 46 – Munnsville, Downtown Oneida	
Oneida	Oneida Castle	254.44	409.48	NY 365 east to I-90 / New York Thruway – Rome	Western terminus of NY 365
Oneida	Village of Vernon	259.39	417.45	NY 31 west to I-90 / New York Thruway – Verona	Western terminus of NY 31 overlap
Oneida	Village of Vernon	260.11	418.61	NY 31 east – Vernon Downs	Eastern terminus of NY 31 overlap
Oneida	Town of Vernon	261.36	420.62	NY 26 – Rome, Vernon Center	
Oneida	Westmoreland	267.04	429.76	NY 233 to I-90 / New York Thruway – Hamilton College, Clinton, Westmoreland	
Oneida	Kirkland	267.87	431.09	NY 5B east	Western terminus of NY 5B; hamlet of Kirkland
Oneida	New Hartford	270.49	435.31	NY 5B west – Clinton	Eastern terminus of NY 5B
Oneida	New Hartford	270.55	435.41	NY 5A east – New York Mills, Yorkville	Western terminus of NY 5A
Oneida	New Hartford	271.49	436.92	NY 12B south – Clinton	Northern terminus of NY 12B
Oneida	New Hartford	271.58	437.07	NY 12 south / Genesee Street – Binghamton, New Hartford	Western terminus of NY 12 overlap
Oneida	New Hartford	271.58	437.07	Western end of limited-access section	
Oneida	Utica	272.48	438.51	NY 8 south / NY 840 west – New Hartford, Whitestown	Cloverleaf interchange; western terminus of NY 8 overlap; eastern terminus of NY 840
Oneida	Utica			French Road (NY 921W) – St Lukes Hospital	Trumpet interchange
Oneida	Utica			Burrstone Road (NY 921B) – New York Mills, MVCC, Utica College, Memorial Parkway	Partial cloverleaf interchange
Oneida	Utica	275.66	443.63	NY 5A west / NY 5S east – Whitesboro, Downtown Utica I-790 begins	Western terminus of I-790 overlap; eastern terminus of NY 5A; western terminus of NY 5S
Oneida	Utica	276.43	444.87	NY 8 north / NY 12 north / NY 49 west – Poland, Watertown, Rome	Eastern terminus of NY 8 / NY 12 overlap; eastern terminus of NY 49
Oneida	Utica	277.25	446.19	I-90 / New York Thruway / Genesee Street	Exit 31 on I-90 / Thruway
Oneida	Utica	277.72	446.95	Eastern end of limited-access section I-790 ends	
Herkimer	Town of Herkimer	289.45	465.82	NY 51 south to NY 5S – Ilion	Northern terminus of NY 51; trumpet interchange
Herkimer	Village of Herkimer	291.48	469.09	NY 28 south (South Caroline Street) to I-90 / New York Thruway – Mohawk	Western terminus of NY 28 overlap
Herkimer	Village of Herkimer	291.98	469.90	South Washington Street (NY 922B south)	Northern terminus of NY 922B
Herkimer	Village of Herkimer	292.18	470.22	NY 28 north – Middleville	Eastern terminus of NY 28 overlap
Herkimer	City of Little Falls	298.95	481.11	Albany Street to NY 167 south – Downtown, Industrial Park	Western terminus of NY 167 overlap
Herkimer	City of Little Falls	299.40	481.84	NY 169 north to NY 170 – Business District	Western terminus of NY 169 overlap
Herkimer	City of Little Falls	299.60	482.16	NY 169 south to I-90 / New York Thruway	Eastern terminus of NY 169 overlap
Herkimer	City of Little Falls	300.01	482.82	NY 167 north – Dolgeville	Eastern terminus of NY 167 overlap
Montgomery	Town of St. Johnsville	310.54	499.77	NY 67 east (New Turnpike Road)	Western terminus of NY 67
Montgomery	Nelliston	314.96	506.88	NY 80 south (River Street) to NY 5S – Fort Plain	Northern terminus of NY 80
Montgomery	Palatine Bridge	317.64	511.19	NY 10 north (Lafayette Street) – Ephratah	Western terminus of NY 10 overlap
Montgomery	Palatine Bridge	317.81	511.47	NY 10 south (Bridge Street) to I-90 / New York Thruway / NY 5S – Canajoharie	Eastern terminus of NY 10 overlap
Montgomery	Fonda	329.22	529.83	NY 334 north (Cayadutta Street) – Sammonsville	Southern terminus of NY 334
Montgomery	Fonda	329.40	530.12	NY 30A north (Broadway Street) – Johnstown	Western terminus of NY 30A overlap
Montgomery	Fonda	329.77	530.71	NY 30A south (Bridge Street) to I-90 / New York Thruway / NY 5S – Fultonville	Eastern terminus of NY 30A overlap
Montgomery	Fort Johnson	336.79	542.01	NY 67 west (Fort Johnson Avenue) – Johnstown, FMCC	Western terminus of NY 67 overlap
Montgomery	City of Amsterdam	339.70	546.69	NY 30 / NY 67 east to I-90 / New York Thruway / NY 5S	Eastern terminus of NY 67 overlap
Schenectady	Glenville	348.54	560.92	NY 103 south (Bridge Street) to NY 5S – Rotterdam Junction	Northern terminus of NY 103
Schenectady	Glenville	351.21	565.22	To I-90 / New York Thruway / I-890 east / NY 5S west	Access via NY 890
Schenectady	Scotia	353.89	569.53	NY 147 north (Sacandaga Road)	Southern terminus of NY 147
Schenectady	Scotia	354.18	570.00	NY 50 north (North Ballston Avenue)	Southern terminus of NY 50
Schenectady	Schenectady	355.88	572.73	Veeder Avenue (NY 914E south)	Northern terminus of NY 914E
Schenectady	Schenectady	356.68	574.02	NY 146 (Brandywine Avenue)	
Schenectady	Schenectady	358.09	576.29	NY 7 (Crosstown Connection)	Diamond interchange
Schenectady	Town of Niskayuna	359.37	578.35	Balltown Road (NY 914T)	
Albany	Village of Colonie	362.84	583.93	NY 155 / CR 157 (New Karner Road) – Voorheesville, Airport	
Albany	Village of Colonie	364.82	587.12	I-87 to I-90 / New York Thruway – Saratoga Springs	Exit 2 on I-87
Albany	Village of Colonie	365.00	587.41	Wolf Road (NY 910B)	
Albany	Albany	367.30	591.11	CR 155 north (Everett Road) to I-90	
Albany	Albany	369.69	594.96	US 9W (Lark Street)	
Albany	Albany	370.45	596.18	NY 32 (South Pearl Street)	No left turns
Albany	Albany	370.80	596.74	I-787 / US 9 / US 20 to I-87 / New York Thruway	Eastern terminus; exits 3B-4 on I-787
1.000 mi = 1.609 km; 1.000 km = 0.621 mi: Concurrency terminus; Electronic toll collection; Incomplete access; Route transition

== Suffixed routes ==
NY 5 has three suffixed routes, all located in Oneida County, with NY 5S extending eastward into three other counties. The NY 5A designation was also used in the past for two other routes.

=== NY 5A ===
- The NY 5A designation has been used for three distinct highways:
  - The first NY 5A was a short-lived designation for the portion of modern NY 5 east of Buffalo. When it existed from 1924 to the mid-1920s, NY 5 was routed on what is now US 20.
  - The second NY 5A was a northerly alternate route of NY 5 between Aurelius and Sennett in Cayuga County. It was assigned c. 1933 and renumbered to NY 135 c. 1937. That route was removed c. 1939. Its former routing is now maintained by Cayuga County as CR 10A, CR 10B, and CR 10C.
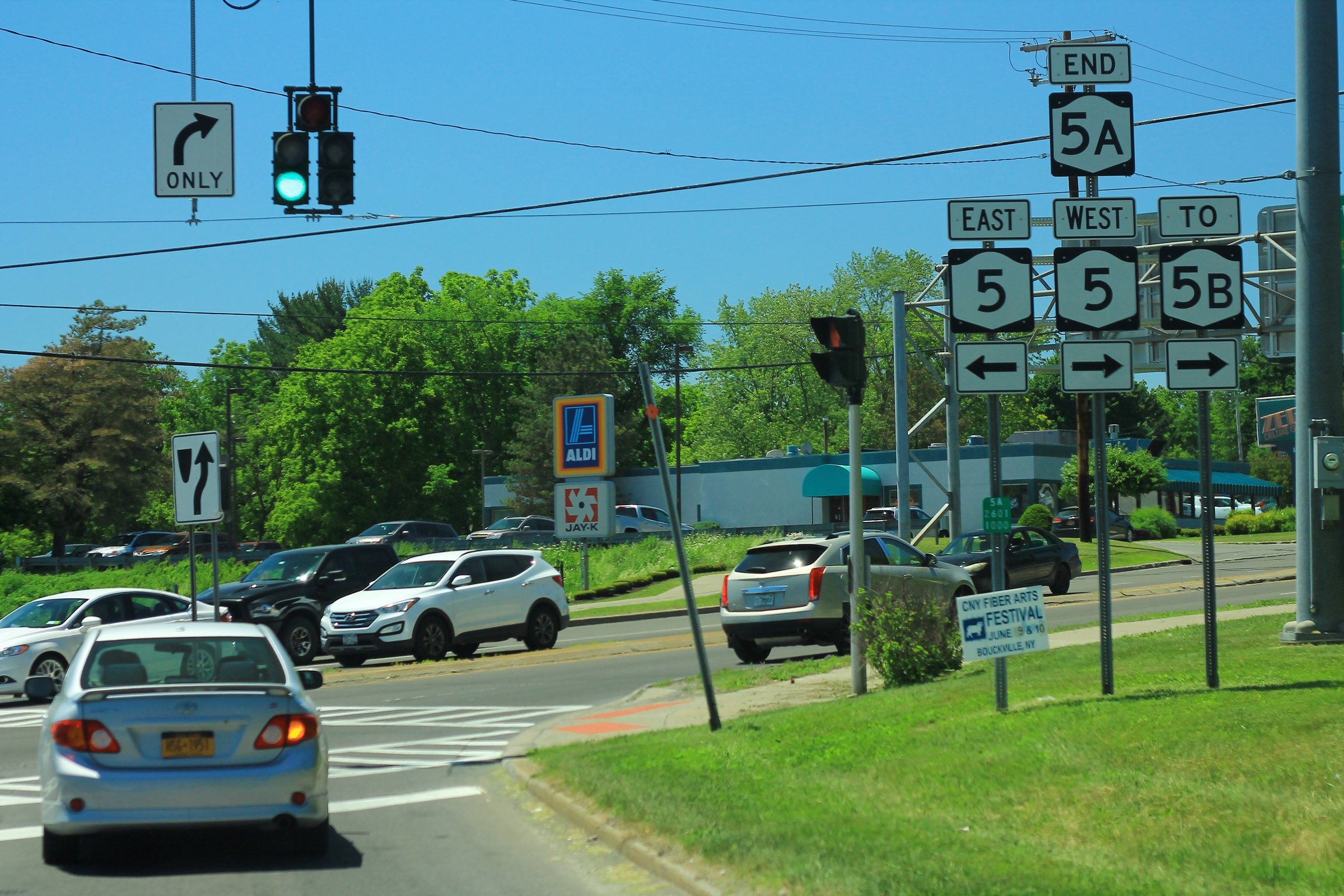
  - Shields at western terminus of NY 5A

The current NY 5A is a short 5.59-mile-long (9.00 km) alternate route of NY 5 between New Hartford and downtown Utica in Oneida County. It was assigned in the mid-1930s. At its eastern end, NY 5A becomes NY 5S at an interchange with Interstate 790 (I-790), NY 5, NY 8, and NY 12. The route is four lanes wide and passes through mostly commercial areas and connects NY 5 to NY 840 and NY 69.

=== NY 5B ===
NY 5B is a 3.12-mile-long (5.02 km) alternate route southwest of Utica in Oneida County, connecting NY 5 to NY 12B. The route was assigned in April 1935. The entire route is in Oneida County.

Location	mi	km	Destinations	Notes
Kirkland	0.00	0.00	NY 5	Western terminus
Kirkland	1.67	2.69	NY 12B south – Clinton	Western end of NY 5B / NY 12B overlap
Kirkland	1.76	2.83	NY 12B north – New Hartford	Eastern end of NY 5B / NY 12B overlap
New Hartford	3.12	5.02	NY 5 – Kirkland, New Hartford, New York Mills	Eastern terminus
1.000 mi = 1.609 km; 1.000 km = 0.621 mi: Concurrency terminus

=== NY 5S ===
- NY 5S (72.92 miles or 117.35 kilometres) is an alternate route of NY 5 on the south side of the Mohawk River between Utica, Oneida County, and Rotterdam, Schenectady County. The route parallels NY 5 (which follows the north side of the river) and is partially a limited-access highway. It was assigned as part of the 1930 renumbering of state highways in New York.

== See also ==
- New York State Bicycle Route 5
- List of county routes in Onondaga County, New York
