= New York State Route 635 =

State highway in Onondaga County, New York, US

New York State Route 635
- Thompson Road
- Map of Syracuse with NY 635 highlighted in red

Route information
- Maintained by NYSDOT
- Length: 2.25 mi (3.62 km)
- Existed: April 1, 1980–present

Major junctions
- South end: NY 5 in Syracuse
- I-690 in Syracuse
- North end: I-90 / New York Thruway / NY 298 in DeWitt

Location
- Country: United States
- State: New York
- Counties: Onondaga

Highway system
- New York Highways; Interstate; US; State; Reference; Parkways
← NY 631	→ I-678

New York State Route 635 (NY 635) is a state highway located in the vicinity of Syracuse in Onondaga County, New York, in the United States. It extends for 2.25 miles (3.62 km) along Thompson Road from an intersection with Erie Boulevard (NY 5) in Syracuse to Carrier Circle in DeWitt, where NY 635 connects to both the New York State Thruway (Interstate 90 or I-90) and NY 298. Along the way NY 635 also meets I-690. The route was assigned in 1980 after the section of Thompson Road between NY 290 and Carrier Circle was acquired by the state of New York.

== Route description ==
NY 635 begins at an intersection with NY 5 (Erie Boulevard) two blocks north of the campus of LeMoyne College in Syracuse. As Thompson Road, NY 635 heads north and connects to I-690 via the full cloverleaf interchange that comprises exit 16. Just past I-690, NY 635 crosses over the Peat Street Runner, a CSX Transportation railroad spur that largely parallels I-690 into downtown Syracuse, prior to intersecting Burnet Avenue, a street connecting NY 635 to the nearby village of East Syracuse.

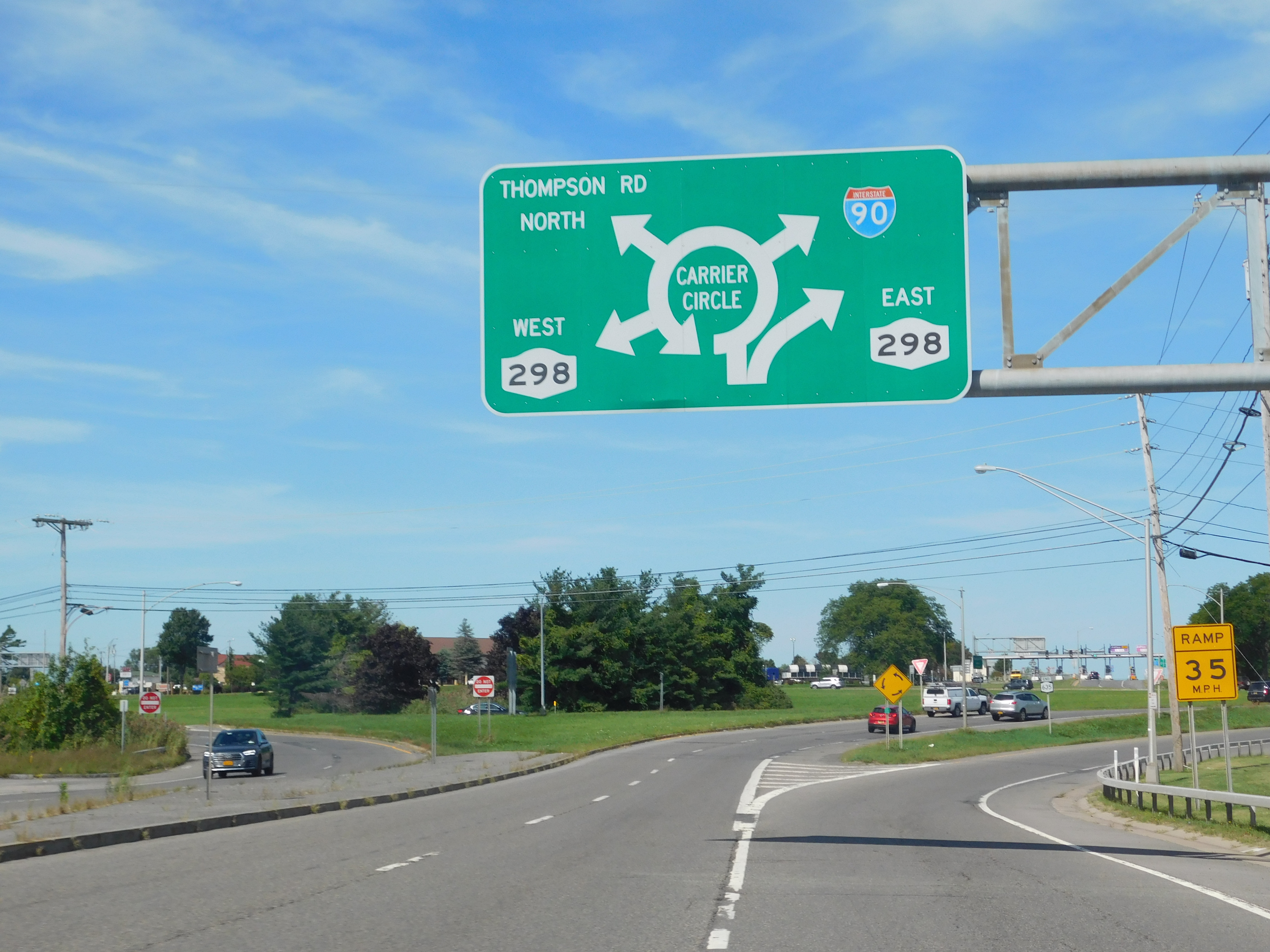
NY 635 approaching NY 298 at Carrier Circle

North of Burnet Avenue, NY 635 narrows slightly from six lanes to four lanes with a median as it heads along the eastern edge of the Eastwood neighborhood of Syracuse. The road also acts as a divider between the residential neighborhoods of eastern Syracuse and the industrial factories situated along CSX Transportation's Mohawk Subdivision rail line in DeWitt. This division ends upon entering DeWitt, where NY 635 meets NY 290 at an intersection centered on a bridge over the four-track main line. From this point north to its terminus at Carrier Circle, NY 635 is surrounded completely by commercial and industrial properties, including the sprawling Carrier Corporation complex just south of the circle. At the circle, NY 635 officially terminates upon meeting NY 298; however, it also connects to the New York State Thruway (I-90) at exit 35 by way of the loop.

== History ==
The segment of NY 635 from NY 290 north to Carrier Circle was originally maintained by Onondaga County as part of County Route 13 (CR 13), a discontinuous route extending from NY 290 in DeWitt north to Northern Boulevard in Cicero with a gap at Syracuse Hancock International Airport. On April 1, 1980, ownership and maintenance of the portion of CR 13 south of Carrier Circle was transferred to the state of New York as part of a highway maintenance swap between the county and the state. This piece of CR 13, as well as a previously state-maintained roadway from NY 290 south to NY 5, was designated NY 635.

== Major intersections ==
The entire route is in Onondaga County.

Location	mi	km	Destinations	Notes
Syracuse	0.00	0.00	NY 5 (Erie Boulevard)	Southern terminus
Syracuse	0.19	0.31	I-690 – DeWitt, Syracuse	Exit 19 (I-690); cloverleaf interchange
DeWitt	1.02	1.64	NY 290 (James Street)	
DeWitt	2.25	3.62	I-90 / New York Thruway / NY 298 – Buffalo, Albany	Carrier Circle; northern terminus
1.000 mi = 1.609 km; 1.000 km = 0.621 mi
