= Eastwood, Syracuse =

Coordinates: 43.0657°N 76.1084°W

- Logo
- Nickname: The Village Within the City
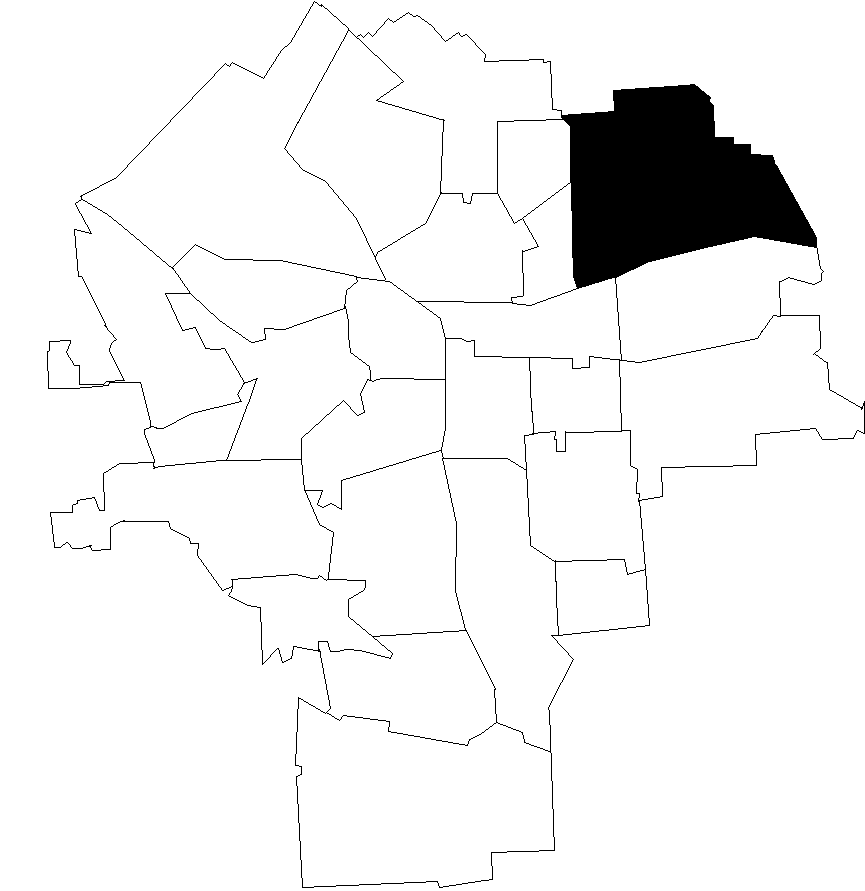
- Established: 1926

Population (2010)
  - Total: 14,440
- ZIP Codes: 13206, 13203

Eastwood is a neighborhood in the northeastern part of Syracuse, New York, located adjacent to East Syracuse, New York, United States.

== History ==
Eastwood was originally a village, and as a suburb of Syracuse, was named for its easterly direction from that place. The neighborhood was part of the last round of annexations by the City of Syracuse, in 1926. Today the neighborhood still has a strong sense of community, and its nickname is "the village within the city."

== Culture ==
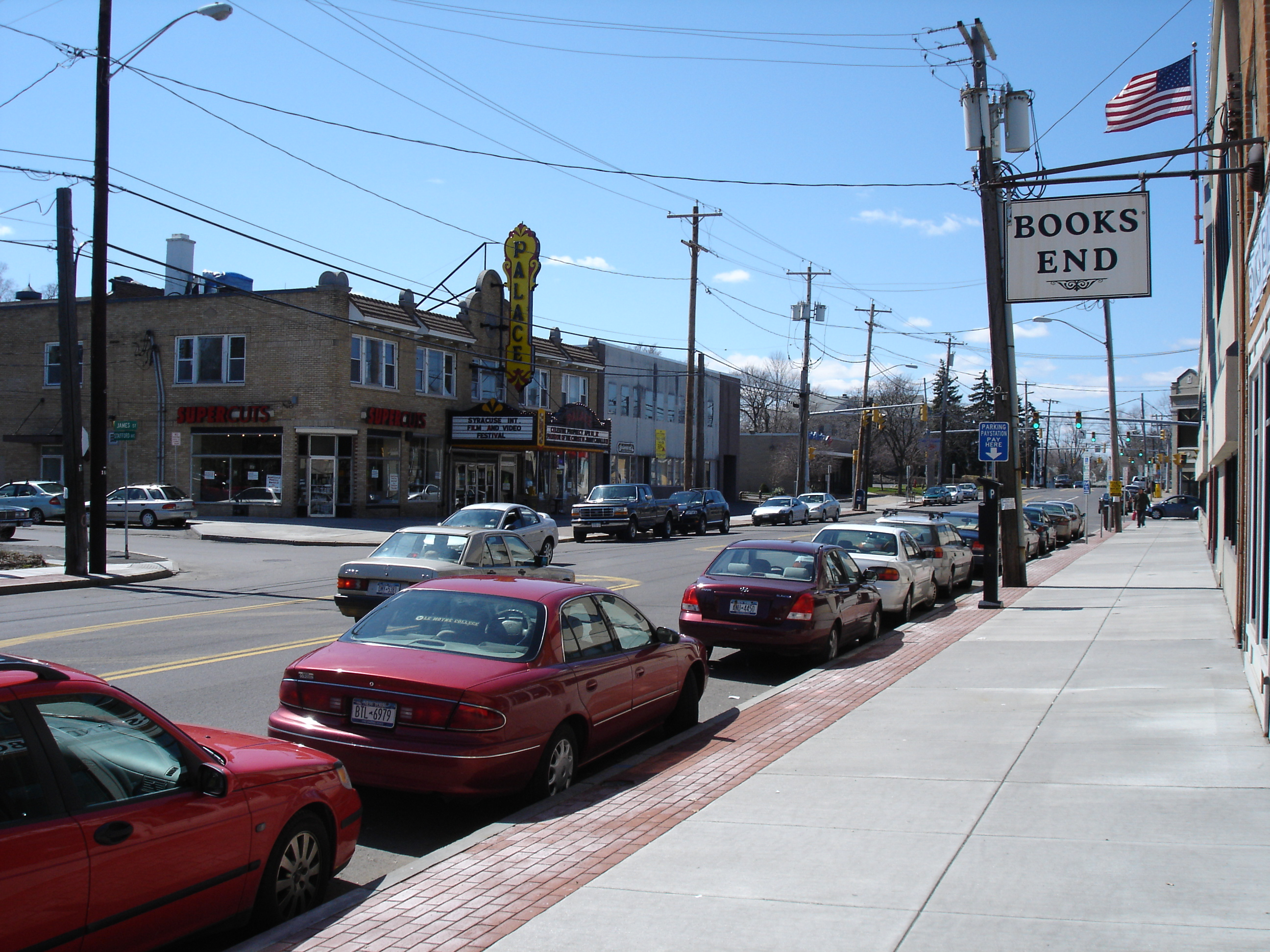
James Street in Eastwood

Eastwood's main retail corridor is along James Street, which still boasts a village-like atmosphere that residents are working to preserve.

The Eastwood Neighborhood Planning Group worked to amend the Zoning Rules and Regulations of the City of Syracuse to require neighborhood approval to any changes to the building structures along James Street.

The neighborhood is also home to the Palace Theatre completed in 1924. It has recently been restored and serves as not only a movie theatre but also as a facility for the community.

The neighborhood schools include: Salem Hyde Elementary, Lincoln Middle School, Huntington K-8 and Henninger High School (with eastern edges of the village falling under the East Syracuse-Minoa Central School District from North Midler Ave and New Court Ave to North Ave, Taft Ave, Craigie Street and Carrier/GM Circles).

The Eastwood community is very open to the restoration of the neighborhood, and currently has many plans on its future.

== Syrathon ==
Eastwood's 5 Mile Run completes Syrathon every October. Syrathon, organized by the Syracuse Parks Conservancy, is a series of 7 established road races based in the City of Syracuse that showcase Syracuse's parks systems and city neighborhoods. Participants who complete enough of those races to accumulate at least 26.2 miles receive a Syrathon medal.

== See also ==
- East Syracuse, New York
