= Onondaga =

Onondaga may refer to:

== Native American/First Nations ==
- Onondaga people, a Native American/First Nations people and one of the five founding nations of the Haudenosaunee League
- Onondaga (village), Onondaga settlement and traditional Haudenosaunee capital
- Onondaga language
- Onondaga Nation, a federally recognized nation of Onondaga people in New York
- Onondaga Clear Sky First Nation, a First Nation at Six Nations of the Grand River in Ontario
- Bearfoot Onondaga First Nation, a First Nation at Six Nations of the Grand River in Ontario

== Geology ==
- Onondaga Limestone, a layer of dense limestone that outcrops in New York and Ontario, Canada
- Onondaga Cave State Park, in Leasburg, Missouri, named after the geological formation
- Onondaga Falls, one of 24 named waterfalls in Ricketts Glen State Park, in Pennsylvania

== Places ==
=== Canada ===
- Onondaga, Ontario, a rural community in the County of Brant, province of Ontario

=== United States ===
- Onondaga County, New York, a county near the center of New York State
  - Onondaga Reservation, a reservation, which is Onondaga Nation territory
  - Onondaga, New York, a town in Onondaga County
    - Onondaga Hill, New York, a hamlet in the Town of Onondaga
- Onondaga Township, Michigan, a township in Michigan's lower peninsula
  - Onondaga, Michigan, an unincorporated community in Onondaga Township

== Ships and organizations ==
- Onondaga Community College in New York
- Onondaga Hill Middle School in New York
- HMCS Onondaga (S73), a submarine in the Royal Canadian Navy
- USS Onondaga, three ships of the US Navy
- The Onondagas, nickname of the 122nd New York Volunteer Infantry regiment in American Civil War
