= Fairmount, New York =

- Census-designated place
- Location in Onondaga County and the state of New York.
- Coordinates: 43°2′37″N 76°14′44″W
- Country: United States
- State: New York
- County: Onondaga

Area
  - Total: 3.36 sq mi (8.71 km^{2})
  - Land: 3.36 sq mi (8.71 km^{2})
  - Water: 0 sq mi (0.00 km^{2})
- Elevation: 490 ft (150 m)

Population (2020)
  - Total: 10,248
  - Density: 3,045.6/sq mi (1,175.91/km^{2})
- Time zone: UTC-5 (Eastern (EST))
  - Summer (DST): UTC-4 (EDT)
- FIPS code: 36-25043
- GNIS feature ID: 0949818

Fairmount is a hamlet (and census-designated place) in Onondaga County, New York, United States. Fairmount is a western suburb of Syracuse, located in the far southeastern corner of the town of Camillus. Its zip code is 13219 (Syracuse). It is located within the West Genesee Central School District. As of the 2020 census, Fairmount had a population of 10,248.

== History ==
The Fairmount area was part of the original 108-square-mile Onondaga Reservation lands which were acquired by the State of New York from the Onondagas in transactions that took place between 1793 and 1795. Formerly part of the Town of Onondaga, it was annexed to the town of Camillus in 1834. Prior to that date, census enumerations for Fairmount were included in the town of Onondaga census. The name originates from 1798 when engineer and politician James Geddes built his estate, called "Fair Mount" at the intersection of Genesee Road (now West Genesee Street) and Onondaga Road. The Brockway Tavern building, located on the northwest corner of West Genesee and Onondaga, formerly housed a tavern, motor inn, restaurants and later a funeral home, and now houses a credit union. The house was built c. 1808 and survives as one of the oldest structures in the hamlet. The oldest house still used as a residence dates from 1876.

Previously known as Tyler or Jeromeville, the area became formally identified as Fairmount when its post office (formerly designated "Tyler") was renamed on January 1, 1846. (This post office was discontinued in 1899.) Fairmount was also a minor station on the Auburn and Syracuse Railroad and its successor railroads (including the New York Central Railroad) from 1838 to the end of the 19th century. The Fairmount Farm Colony, a working farm for the vocational training of young men with intellectual disabilities, was established by the Syracuse State School north of the hamlet in 1883. Farmland in the hamlet was developed into residential tracts from the 1890s through the 1990s, with intense residential and commercial development during the 1950s and 1960s. A large area of undeveloped land, formerly used for quarrying and a munitions factory in the 19th and early 20th centuries, borders Fairmount to the south at Split Rock.

The Geddes family's "Fair Mount" mansion was demolished in 1929, although a carriage house from the estate survived until 2014. Small sections of the estate's stone fences are still standing.

In 2007, Fairmount was 27th on Newsweek's "Best Places to Raise Your Kids" list.

== Geography ==
Fairmount is located at 43°2′37″N 76°14′44″W (43.043616, -76.245462).

According to the United States Census Bureau, the CDP has a total area of 3.4 square miles (8.8 km^{2}), all land.

== Demographics ==
Historical population
Census	Pop.	Note	%±
2020	10,248		—
U.S. Decennial Census

=== 2020 census ===
As of the 2020 census, Fairmount had a population of 10,248. The median age was 42.4 years. 20.5% of residents were under the age of 18 and 20.0% of residents were 65 years of age or older. For every 100 females there were 88.1 males, and for every 100 females age 18 and over there were 85.3 males age 18 and over.

100.0% of residents lived in urban areas, while 0.0% lived in rural areas.

There were 4,426 households in Fairmount, of which 27.2% had children under the age of 18 living in them. Of all households, 44.7% were married-couple households, 16.0% were households with a male householder and no spouse or partner present, and 31.1% were households with a female householder and no spouse or partner present. About 31.0% of all households were made up of individuals and 15.0% had someone living alone who was 65 years of age or older.

There were 4,576 housing units, of which 3.3% were vacant. The homeowner vacancy rate was 0.4% and the rental vacancy rate was 5.2%.

Racial composition as of the 2020 census
Race	Number	Percent
White	8,926	87.1%
Black or African American	390	3.8%
American Indian and Alaska Native	56	0.5%
Asian	213	2.1%
Native Hawaiian and Other Pacific Islander	0	0.0%
Some other race	67	0.7%
Two or more races	596	5.8%
Hispanic or Latino (of any race)	329	3.2%

=== 2000 census ===
As of the 2000 census, there were 10,795 people, 4,397 households, and 3,108 families residing in the CDP. The population density was 3,204.9 inhabitants per square mile (1,237.4/km^{2}). There were 4,536 housing units at an average density of 1,346.7 per square mile (520.0/km^{2}). The racial makeup of the CDP was 95.75% White, 1.29% African American, 0.31% Native American, 1.35% Asian, 0.03% Pacific Islander, 0.29% from other races, and 0.99% from two or more races. Hispanic or Latino of any race were 1.07% of the population.

There were 4,397 households, out of which 28.7% had children under the age of 18 living with them, 57.8% were married couples living together, 10.2% had a female householder with no husband present, and 29.3% were non-families. 25.5% of all households were made up of individuals, and 14.1% had someone living alone who was 65 years of age or older. The average household size was 2.46 and the average family size was 2.96.

In the CDP, the population was spread out, with 23.1% under the age of 18, 5.6% from 18 to 24, 27.3% from 25 to 44, 22.8% from 45 to 64, and 21.2% who were 65 years of age or older. The median age was 41 years. For every 100 females, there were 89.1 males. For every 100 females age 18 and over, there were 84.4 males.

The median income for a household in the CDP was $48,329, and the median income for a family was $56,686. Males had a median income of $39,780 versus $29,287 for females. The per capita income for the CDP was $21,806. About 2.5% of families and 3.7% of the population were below the poverty line, including 4.5% of those under age 18 and 4.8% of those age 65 or over.

== Education ==
The majority of Fairmount census-designated place is in the West Genesee Central School District while a portion is in the Westhill Central School District.

== Notable people ==
- George Truesdell, American businessman (1842 – 1921)
