= Alvord =

Alvord may refer to:

== People ==
- Alvord (surname)

== Places ==
- Alvord Desert in southeast Oregon
- Alvord House in Salina, New York
- Alvord Mountain in California
- Alvord, California, former name of Zurich, California
- Alvord, Iowa
- Alvord, Texas
- Alvord, West Virginia
