= Westvale, New York =

- Census-designated place
- Location in Onondaga County and the state of New York.
- Coordinates: 43°2′30″N 76°13′1″W
- Country: United States
- State: New York
- County: Onondaga

Area
  - Total: 1.35 sq mi (3.49 km^{2})
  - Land: 1.35 sq mi (3.49 km^{2})
  - Water: 0 sq mi (0.00 km^{2})
- Elevation: 505 ft (154 m)

Population (2020)
  - Total: 5,090
  - Density: 3,773.9/sq mi (1,457.13/km^{2})
- Time zone: UTC-5 (Eastern (EST))
  - Summer (DST): UTC-4 (EDT)
- ZIP code: 13219
- Area code: 315
- FIPS code: 36-81127
- GNIS feature ID: 0970945

Westvale is a suburban community (and census-designated place) in Onondaga County, New York, United States. As of the 2020 census, Westvale had a population of 5,090.

Westvale is in the town of Geddes, lying east of Fairmount and southwest of Solvay. Westvale is a suburb of Syracuse, which is to the east.

== Geography ==
Westvale is located at 43°2′30″N 76°13′1″W (43.041716, -76.217073).

According to the United States Census Bureau, Westvale has a total area of 1.4 square miles (3.6 km^{2}), all land.

== Demographics ==
Historical population
Census	Pop.	Note	%±
2020	5,090		—
U.S. Decennial Census

As of the census of 2000, there were 5,166 people, 2,061 households, and 1,506 families residing in the community. The population density was 3,833.1 inhabitants per square mile (1,480.0/km^{2}). There were 2,094 housing units at an average density of 1,553.7 per square mile (599.9/km^{2}). The racial makeup of the CDP was 97.87% White, 0.27% African American, 0.37% Native American, 0.48% Asian, 0.02% Pacific Islander, 0.19% from other races, and 0.79% from two or more races. Hispanic or Latino of any race were 1.06% of the population.

There were 2,061 households, out of which 30.9% had children under the age of 18 living with them, 60.0% were married couples living together, 10.8% had a female householder with no husband present, and 26.9% were non-families. 24.5% of all households were made up of individuals, and 16.1% had someone living alone who was 65 years of age or older. The average household size was 2.50 and the average family size was 2.98.

In the CDP, the population was spread out, with 24.3% under the age of 18, 4.5% from 18 to 24, 22.7% from 25 to 44, 26.5% from 45 to 64, and 22.0% who were 65 years of age or older. The median age was 44 years. For every 100 females, there were 87.9 males. For every 100 females age 18 and over, there were 82.0 males.

The median income for a household in the CDP was $54,870, and the median income for a family was $62,071. Males had a median income of $44,107 versus $31,672 for females. The per capita income for the CDP was $23,678. About 4.5% of families and 6.0% of the population were below the poverty line, including 9.7% of those under age 18 and 7.8% of those age 65 or over.

== History ==
"Westvale" as an identity probably evolved in the early 20th century; it refers to the area west of Wescott Reservoir, accessed by, but mostly south of, West Genesee Street (since the Village of Solvay was to the north). Farther west was Fairmount, which developed earlier than most of Westvale, where the land was held off the market. The "Avery Tract" lay between the reservoir and the City of Syracuse. The Avery Tract became part of the Village of Solvay. The core of Westvale was farmland retained by a major landowning family of New York State, the Schuylers. he branch holding title to much of the property was the Parsons, recalled by Parsons Drive, a centerpiece residential boulevard with a grassy median, off West Genesee Street.

A few Westvale houses predate suburban development. The Parsons farmhouse was replaced by development at the end of the 20th century. West Genesee Street has a few late 19th century residences. Early 20th century streets show houses in styles of the period, especially the 1920s and 1930s. After World War II, development was rapid, and most houses of Westvale now date from the later twentieth century. Westvale Plaza, one of the earliest suburban "malls" of the region, appeared in the Avery Tract shortly after World War II. It is extant as a "strip mall," while Fairmount Fair, immediately beyond Westvale to the west, came later. Its interior pedestrian concourse was roofed over about 1967, making it the first indoor, climate-controlled shopping mall in Central New York.

The stretch of West Genesee Street between the Avery Tract and Fairmout was spared commercial development through the political activism of the Westvale-Avery Club, a men's organization.

== Education ==
The majority of Westvale census-designated place is in the Westhill Central School District. A portion is in the West Genesee Central School District

Westvale was once part of the Village of Solvay school district. Cherry Road School originally served grades K-8, thereafter students walked to Solvay High School. Since 1962, however, the majority of Westvale has been served by the Westhill Central School District.
