= West Genesee High School =

Location
- 5201 W Genesee St; Camillus, New York 13031; United States; 43.0389°N 76.2659°W

Information
- Type: Public
- Motto: We Celebrate Learning!
- Established: 1952
- School district: West Genesee Central School District
- NCES School ID: 363063004119
- Principal: Tracy Klefbeck; Thomas Vaughan, Jr.
- Teaching staff: 110.63 (on an FTE basis)
- Grades: 9-12
- Enrollment: 1,387 (2023-2024)
- Student to teacher ratio: 12.54
- Campus: Suburban
- Colors: Blue and Gold
- Mascot: Wildcats
- Yearbook: Genesean
- Website: www.westgenesee.org/o/wghs

West Genesee High School (colloquially referred to as West Genny or WG) is a 9–12 public high school in Camillus, New York, United States. It is part of the West Genesee Central School District.

== Recognized academic programs ==
In addition to general and Regents level courses, the school offers a number of college-level course options for students through a variety of different programs.

=== Advanced Placement courses ===
West Genesee High School offers a wide variety of Advanced Placement Program (AP) courses to its students. These courses are generally considered "much more rigorous than the general course offerings".

Courses offered include English language & composition, English literature & composition, world history, US history, statistics, calculus, physics, biology, French language, Spanish language, studio art, music theory.

=== Syracuse University Project Advance ===
In addition to AP courses, the school offers a number of courses through the Syracuse University Project Advance (SUPA) program. The students receive Syracuse University college credits, but the courses are taught by teachers named adjunct instructors by S.U. and are taught in classrooms at the high school as a part of a student's regular day.

Courses offered through Project Advance include economics, psychology, public affairs, and sociology.

=== Onondaga Community College ===
The school also offers courses for college credit through Onondaga Community College, a local community college. Like the SUPA courses, these courses are taught in classrooms at the high school.

Courses include financial accounting, astronomy, CAD, computer information systems, introduction to business, photography and precalculus.

== West Genesee Wildcats ==
West Genesee High School's athletic teams are known as the "Wildcats". Their colors are Blue and gold. All of the teams compete in the NYSPHAA's Section 3.

Students are able to participate in baseball, basketball, bowling, cheerleading, cross-country, football, golf, hockey, lacrosse, soccer, softball, swimming, tennis, track, volleyball, and wrestling.

A number of West Genesee's athletic teams have won state championships: Marching band (34), boys' lacrosse (15), girls' lacrosse (7), wrestling (5), boys' hockey (4), girls' swimming (3), boys' track (2), girls' hockey (2), football, boys' golf, and boys' swimming (1) and boys' basketball (1) and baseball (1). The marching band has also won the national championship 5 times (most recently 2013). Additionally the marching band has participated in multiple Bands of America Regional and Grand National Finals.

=== Lacrosse ===
Hall of Fame coach Mike Messere was the head coach from 1975 to 2018. During his tenure, the Wildcats' finished the season first in the national high school rankings 8 times between 1990 and 2018.

The team has won 15 New York State championships, including four consecutive between 2002 and 2005, and 34 Section III championships.

As of 2011, the program has produced 52 high school All-Americans since 1971.

John Desko, the former head coach of Syracuse University's men's lacrosse team is a former player and alumnus of the school.

The girls' lacrosse team began in 1995. The team has won six state championships in 2001, 2002, 2003, 2007, 2008, and 2012. Between 2001 and 2003, the Lady 'Cats won 67 consecutive games, and as of 13 October 2008 the team has won 48 consecutive games dating back to the beginning of the 2007 season.

=== Ice hockey ===
The West Genesee hockey team is a three-time New York State Champion winning in 1990, 2001, 2010 (when the team was undefeated), and most recently 2023. The Wildcats have won 12 Section 3 championships including seven straight between 2008 and 2014. Coach Frank Colabufo has an all-time record of 390-146-39.

Defenseman Robert Michel, Class of 2013, went on to play in the Philadelphia Flyers organization. Michel previously played four seasons at the University of Maine, where he was named captain in his senior season.

=== Basketball ===
In the winter of 2018–2019, the boys' basketball team secured the first state championship in the team's existence, and the girls' team was runner up in the state championship.

=== Football ===
In the fall of 2007, the football team claimed its first New York State Class AA Championship. The team is coached by Joe Corley, a position he has held since May 2008.

=== Baseball ===
In June 2026, the baseball team won its first New York State title, defeating Cornwall 4-0. The team is coached by Kevin Krause, who has been the team's head coach since 2002. The team has seen recent success winning 3 straight Class AA Sectional titles.

== Clubs and activities ==
In addition to academics and athletics, West Genesee High School also offers a number of clubs and other extracurricular activities.

These include Academic Decathlon, Business Club, Drama Club, Future Business Leaders of America (FBLA), Technical Theatre club, Foreign Language Clubs, Model UN, Honor Society, R^{2} (Respect and Responsibility), Positivity Project (replacing R^{2}), Ski Club, Student Council and Class Senates, Yearbook Club, ECOS (Environmental group), and Outdoor Club.
