= Anthony Walker =

Anthony, Antony, or Tony Walker may refer to:

== Sportspeople ==
- Anthony Walker (rower) (born 1939), Australian Olympic rower
- Anthony Walker (rugby league) (born 1991), rugby league player
- Tony Walker (outfielder) (born 1959), American baseball player
- Tony Walker (pitcher), American baseball player
- Anthony Walker Jr. (born 1995), American football player
- Tony Walker (American football) (born 1968), American football player

== Others ==
- Anthony Walker (artist) (1726–1765), English printmaker
- Anthony Guy Walker (born 1957), American criminal and serial killer
- Anthony Walker (politician) (born 1965), American politician
- Antony Walker (1934–2023), British general
- Murder of Anthony Walker, high-profile British murder in 2005
- Antony Walker (conductor) (born 1967), Australian-born conductor of mostly opera
- Tony Walker (born 1955), British cab driver, actor and participant in the Up documentary film series

== See also ==
- John Anthony Walker (1937–2014), US Navy officer convicted of spying for the Soviet Union
