= Benjamin Alvord =

Benjamin Alvord is the name of:

- Benjamin Alvord (mathematician) (1813–1884), American soldier, mathematician, and botanist
- Benjamin Alvord Jr. (1860–1927), son of the above, American soldier, U.S. general during World War I

== See also ==
- Alvord (surname)
