= Syracuse Stone Railroad =

Overview
- Headquarters: Syracuse, New York
- Locale: Syracuse, New York to Onondaga, New York
- Dates of operation: 1836–1836
- Successor: Syracuse and Onondaga Railroad

Technical
- Track gauge: 4 ft 8 1/2 in (1,435 mm) standard gauge

The Syracuse Stone Railroad, incorporated in Syracuse, New York, on May 13, 1836, was approved by the State to build a road from Syracuse to local quarries in Onondaga, New York.

The road was chartered on the same day as the Syracuse and Onondaga Railroad, which was organized for the same purpose and completed on October 16, 1838. The Syracuse Stone Railroad was abandoned before construction started and consolidated into the Syracuse and Onondaga Railroad.
