= Taunton, New York =

Taunton
- hamlet
- Location within the state of New York
- Coordinates: 43.03°N 76.20°W
- Country: United States
- State: New York
- County: Onondaga
- Time zone: UTC-5 (Eastern (EST))
  - Summer (DST): UTC-4 (EDT)

Taunton is a hamlet in the Town of Onondaga in Onondaga County, New York, United States, southwest of the city of Syracuse. Landmarks of Taunton are the former Morey's Mill, once a popular source of apple cider, and Wolf Hollow, an estate created by William S. Andrews, Judge of the New York Court of Appeals, and his wife, noted author Mary Raymond Shipman Andrews. Taunton has a scenic situation amid drumlins at the foot of the Appalachian Plateau escarpment. Taunton was served by an interurban trolley line that connected the cities of Syracuse and Auburn, passing through nearby Split Rock. The trolley right-of-way has become Onondaga Boulevard.
