= Syracuse and Onondaga Railroad =

Overview
- Headquarters: Syracuse, New York
- Locale: Syracuse, New York to Split Rock, New York
- Dates of operation: 1836–1838

Technical
- Track gauge: 4 ft 8 1/2 in (1,435 mm) standard gauge

The Syracuse and Onondaga Railroad was chartered in Syracuse, New York, on May 13, 1836, and was granted approval by the State to build a road from Syracuse to local quarries in Split Rock, New York.

The road was incorporated on the same day as the Syracuse Stone Railroad which was organized for the same purpose. Both roads were consolidated before the construction of the road was complete on October 16, 1838.
