= Galeville, New York =

- Census-designated place
- Location in Onondaga County and the state of New York.
- Coordinates: 43°5′20″N 76°10′43″W
- Country: United States
- State: New York
- County: Onondaga

Area
  - Total: 2.15 sq mi (5.57 km^{2})
  - Land: 1.25 sq mi (3.25 km^{2})
  - Water: 0.90 sq mi (2.33 km^{2})
- Elevation: 423 ft (129 m)

Population (2020)
  - Total: 4,482
  - Density: 3,577/sq mi (1,381.1/km^{2})
- Time zone: UTC-5 (Eastern (EST))
  - Summer (DST): UTC-4 (EDT)
- ZIP code: 13088
- Area code: 315
- FIPS code: 36-28035
- GNIS feature ID: 0950848

Galeville is a hamlet (and census-designated place) in Onondaga County, New York, United States. As of the 2020 census, Galeville had a population of 4,482.

The community is a northwestern suburb of Syracuse, located in the eastern end of the town of Salina .

== Geography ==
Galeville is located at 43°5′20″N 76°10′43″W (43.088816, -76.178631).

According to the United States Census Bureau, the CDP has a total area of 1.1 square miles (2.8 km^{2}), all land.

Galeville is north of Onondaga Lake and borders Ley Creek, which flows into the lake. Interstate 81 passes through the eastern side of the community and intersects the New York State Thruway (Interstate 90) north of Galeville.

== Demographics ==
Historical population
| Census | Pop. | Note | %± |
|---|---|---|---|
| 2020 | 4,482 | | — |
U.S. Decennial Census

=== 2020 census ===
As of the 2020 census, Galeville had a population of 4,482. The median age was 45.8 years. 17.8% of residents were under the age of 18 and 26.3% of residents were 65 years of age or older. For every 100 females there were 83.7 males, and for every 100 females age 18 and over there were 81.6 males age 18 and over.

100.0% of residents lived in urban areas, while 0.0% lived in rural areas.

There were 1,960 households in Galeville, of which 23.0% had children under the age of 18 living in them. Of all households, 33.0% were married-couple households, 20.9% were households with a male householder and no spouse or partner present, and 35.5% were households with a female householder and no spouse or partner present. About 38.6% of all households were made up of individuals and 20.0% had someone living alone who was 65 years of age or older.

There were 2,081 housing units, of which 5.8% were vacant. The homeowner vacancy rate was 1.5% and the rental vacancy rate was 7.8%.

Racial composition as of the 2020 census
| Race | Number | Percent |
|---|---|---|
| White | 3,536 | 78.9% |
| Black or African American | 251 | 5.6% |
| American Indian and Alaska Native | 31 | 0.7% |
| Asian | 249 | 5.6% |
| Native Hawaiian and Other Pacific Islander | 0 | 0.0% |
| Some other race | 54 | 1.2% |
| Two or more races | 361 | 8.1% |
| Hispanic or Latino (of any race) | 218 | 4.9% |

=== 2000 census ===
As of the census of 2000, there were 4,476 people, 2,040 households, and 1,205 families residing in the CDP. The population density was 3,922.4 inhabitants per square mile (1,514.4/km^{2}). There were 2,104 housing units at an average density of 1,843.8 per square mile (711.9/km^{2}). The racial makeup of the CDP was 91.76% White, 3.87% African American, 0.63% Native American, 1.52% Asian, 0.04% Pacific Islander, 0.56% from other races, and 1.63% from two or more races. Hispanic or Latino of any race were 1.27% of the population.

There were 2,040 households, out of which 21.7% had children under the age of 18 living with them, 42.6% were married couples living together, 12.0% had a female householder with no husband present, and 40.9% were non-families. 35.2% of all households were made up of individuals, and 19.6% had someone living alone who was 65 years of age or older. The average household size was 2.17 and the average family size was 2.78.

In the CDP, the population was spread out, with 19.0% under the age of 18, 6.1% from 18 to 24, 28.1% from 25 to 44, 19.7% from 45 to 64, and 27.0% who were 65 years of age or older. The median age was 43 years. For every 100 females, there were 85.6 males. For every 100 females age 18 and over, there were 81.0 males.

The median income for a household in the CDP was $36,569, and the median income for a family was $44,219. Males had a median income of $31,783 versus $25,878 for females. The per capita income for the CDP was $22,407. About 6.6% of families and 7.5% of the population were below the poverty line, including 11.9% of those under age 18 and 4.9% of those age 65 or over.

== Education ==
The school district is Liverpool Central School District.

== Emergency services ==
Galeville is protected by the Liverpool Fire Department, an all-volunteer agency, whose fire station #2 is located at 1029 7th North Street.
