= Onondaga Township =

Onondaga Township may refer to the following places:

In Canada

- Onondaga Township, Ontario, a historical township of Brant County

In the United States

- Onondaga Township, Michigan

== See also ==
- Onondaga (disambiguation)
