= Gene Grabosky =

American football player (1936–2001)

No. 78
- Position: Defensive tackle

Personal information
- Born: September 1, 1936; Syracuse, New York, U.S.
- Died: May 4, 2001 (aged 64); Liverpool, New York, U.S.
- Listed height: 6 ft 5 in (1.96 m)
- Listed weight: 275 lb (125 kg)

Career information
- High school: Liverpool (Liverpool, New York)
- College: Syracuse
- NFL draft: 1959: 26th round, 305th overall pick

Career history
- Buffalo Bills (1960)

Career AFL statistics
- Games played: 3
- Stats at Pro Football Reference

Harry Eugene Grabosky (September 1, 1936 – May 4, 2001) was an American collegiate and professional football defensive tackle. He played professionally in the American Football League (AFL) for the Buffalo Bills. He played college football at Syracuse University and was drafted 305th overall in the 26th round of the 1959 NFL draft by the Washington Redskins.

== See also ==
- List of American Football League players
