= Liverpool High School =

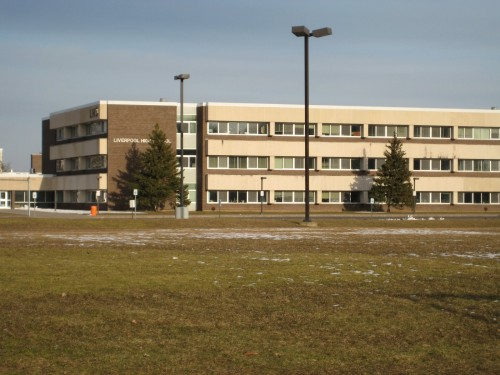

Location
- 4338 Wetzel Rd; Liverpool, New York 13090; United States; 43°08′54″N 76°12′56″W

Information
- Type: Public
- Established: 1967
- School district: Liverpool Central School District
- NCES School ID: 361752001565
- Principal: Briana O’brien
- Teaching staff: 151.83 (on an FTE basis)
- Grades: 9-12
- Enrollment: 2,100 (2023-2024)
- Student to teacher ratio: 13.83
- Campus: Suburban
- Colors: Blue and Orange
- Mascot: Legends (2025) formerly Warriors
- Rival: Cicero–North Syracuse High School
- Yearbook: Hiawathan
- Website: www.liverpool.k12.ny.us/schools/lhs

Liverpool High School (LHS) is a comprehensive public high school in Liverpool, New York, northwest of Syracuse in the Liverpool Central School District, serving ninth to twelfth grade students. It is the only high school in the district. LHS generally accepts students graduating from Liverpool Middle School, Soule Road Middle School, Chestnut Hill Middle School, and Morgan Road Middle School. The school is governed under the authority of the New York State Education Department, whose standardized examinations are designed and administered by the Board of Regents of the University of the State of New York.

== Liverpool High School Annex ==
The Annex was one half of Morgan Road School, which housed grade nine; the other half hosts the Morgan Road Elementary School. A faculty-led initiative in 2007 led to the re-branding of the school as "LHX" - an acronym of Liverpool High School Annex. This was done to highlight the fact that the Annex was part of Liverpool High School, yet also a distinct educational environment. The Annex closed in 2021 to become Morgan Road Middle School, and moved the freshmen to the main building.

== Renovation ==
Liverpool High School is a part of the Liverpool Central School District capital project to renovate and improve buildings in the district. The project was approved by voters on March 10, 2016, and allocates $39,481,107 to district-wide improvements. Modifications to the LHS main building will include relocation of the main entrance, expansions to the auditorium, offices, gymnasium, various art rooms, and the band, orchestra and choral rooms, as well as replacement and upgrades to the building utilities. While renovations are underway, classes that are usually held in the areas under construction are being held at Wetzel Road Elementary School, a past elementary school within a short walking distance of LHS that was closed down after the 2009-2010 school year.

== Academics ==
=== Curriculum ===
Liverpool High School offers more than 150 different courses in English, Social Studies, Mathematics, Science, Languages Other Than English, Art, Music, Family & Consumer Science, Health, Business, Technology, and Physical Education. Workforce Preparation Programs are available through Onondaga-Cortland-Madison Board of Cooperative Education (BOCES). The school focuses on graduating all students with the minimum of a Regents Diploma, but some may also graduate with a less advanced local diploma. The Regents Diploma with Advanced Designation may be achieved with extended studies in a foreign language.

Though the curriculum is developed and sanctioned by the New York State Department of Education, and classes are developed to prepare students to achieve success on the required Regents Examinations, most core courses offer one or two components that explore more advanced topics. The school not only offers standard level Regents courses (Academic level), but also offers more advanced Advanced Placement (AP), College-credit (College), and Honors (H) courses. The criteria used in placing students in the instructional levels are classroom performance, teacher and counselor recommendations, standardized test scores, and individual student preferences. Advanced students may begin earning high school credits in middle school through an accelerated program in mathematics and/ or foreign language.

The school uses a 100 grade point scale, as opposed to the much more common 4.0 scale. The rank in class is established by placing students in descending order from highest to lowest according to their weighted grade point average. The weighted grade point average is calculated with Advanced Placement (AP) courses and College Level courses weighted at 1.1 and Honors Level courses weighted at 1.05.

=== Course offerings ===
- Mathematics: Integrated Algebra, Geometry, Trigonometry, Calculus AB, Precalculus, Computer Science
- Science: Biology, Chemistry, Physics, Earth Science
- History: Global History, United States History, United States Government & Politics, Economics, Psychology, Sociology, Civil & Criminal Law
- Foreign Language: Spanish, French, Latin
- Humanities: Writing, Journalism, Public Speaking
- Physical Education, and Health: Fitness, Weightlifting, Health, Personal Safety
- Arts: Studio Art, Choir, Band, Orchestra, Music Theory
- Technology: Project Lead The Way, DECA, Computer Aided Design, Graphic Design, Broadcasting Technology

==== Advanced Placement ====
- Mathematics: Calculus AB, Calculus BC, Statistics, Computer Science
- Science: Biology, Chemistry, Physics B
- Humanities: Language and Composition, Literature and Composition
- Social Studies: World History, United States History, Government & Politics: US, European History, Economics: Macro
- Foreign Language: Spanish, French
- Arts: Studio Art, Music Theory

==== Syracuse University Project Advance (SUPA) ====
- Humanities: English Literature, English Composition, Psychology, Web Design

== Athletics and extracurriculars ==
=== Athletics ===
Liverpool High School's 32 varsity athletic teams the American Division of the OHL, Section III of the New York State Public High School Athletic Association (NYSPHSAA) New York State Public High School Athletic Association, and Section III of the New York State Scholastic Rowing Association NYSRowing.com - Welcome. Liverpool has over 30 varsity teams and over 45 other teams that provide a range of team and individual sports. A wide variety of teams CNYCL and Section III championships every year, and the vast majority of athletes are honored with NYS Scholar Athlete Awards. The school has won state titles in multiple individual and team sports including boys and girls cross country, tennis, soccer, swimming, track, wrestling, lacrosse, football and cheerleading . Many teams also have modified, freshman and junior varsity components. To be eligible for any athletic activity or extracurricular activity, students must maintain a 70 overall average. In addition students are required to pass at least four subjects. The varsity teams include:

Liverpool Varsity Sports Teams
Season:	Girls:	Boys:
Fall	Cheerleading, Cross Country, Diving, Field Hockey, Soccer, Swimming, Tennis, Volleyball	Cross Country, Football, Golf, Soccer, Volleyball
Winter	Basketball, Bowling, Cheerleading, Indoor Track	Basketball, Bowling, Cheerleading, Diving, Ice Hockey, Indoor Track, Swimming, Wrestling
Spring	Crew, Golf, Lacrosse, Softball, Track	Baseball, Crew, Lacrosse, Tennis, Track

All varsity teams practice and compete on the high school campus, with a few exceptions. The hockey team practices and competes at the Greater Baldwinsville Ice Arena in Baldwinsville, New York and crew teams practice on Onondaga Lake and compete at various venues. Also, the indoor track teams compete at various colleges and venues.

==== Stadium ====
Liverpool High School shut down their stadium in 2007 after it was deemed unsafe to play because of the uneven turf. While it was shut down, home football games were played in the Syracuse University Carrier Dome. In 2010, after much debate with taxpayers, the 6.8 million dollar stadium was completed with state and district funds. The new stadium complex is very similar to the old complex however there are several improvements. Namely, the new stadium includes new bleachers on both sides of the field, a new running track and drainage system, an upgraded press box, visitor stands opposite the main stands, upgraded concession stand, and an enclosed box used for district officials and other notable guests. The stadium was renovated again in 2025, which added a new turf field, track, extended bleachers, and a new press box.

== Fine Arts ==
At Liverpool High School and across the school district and community, participation in music, art, dance, and the theater is highly encouraged. The quality of instruction and the achievements of students and alumni are highly regarded. For more information, see the New York State Field Band Conference and the external links.

== Demographics ==
As of the 2019-2020 school year, there were 2,147 students enrolled at Liverpool High School: 572 in grade nine, 502 in grade ten, 559 in grade eleven, and 514 in grade twelve. The racial/ethnic makeup of the student population was: 74% White, 11% Black or African American, 5% Asian or Pacific Islander, 5% Hispanic.

There were 151 teachers employed at the school, making the student to teacher ratio approximately 15:1.

== Notable alumni ==
- Dave Tretowicz – retired NHL/USA Olympic Ice Hockey Player
- Scott Cassidy – retired MLB pitcher
- Josh Ford – goalkeeper for Seattle Sounders FC of MLS
- Chris Gedney – former NFL tight end
- Gene Grabosky – former NFL defensive tackle
- Tim Green – retired NFL linebacker/defensive end, author
- Pete Holohan – retired NFL tight end
- Chris Jones – retired MLB outfielder
- Marc Mero – retired amateur boxer and professional wrestler.
- Mike Rawlings – mayor of Dallas, TX
- Jen Rhines – Olympic long–distance runner
- Jack Smith, US special prosecutor
- Paul Tripoli – retired NFL defensive back
- Anthony Walker – politician and former member of the Missouri House of Representatives
