= USS Onondaga =

Three vessels of the United States Navy or United States Coast Guard have been named USS Onondaga, after Onondaga Lake and Onondaga County, New York.

- The first USS Onondaga (1863) was a monitor in use during the American Civil War and later sold to the French Navy.
- The second USRC Onondaga (1898) was a United States Revenue Cutter Service cutter commissioned in 1898 that served in the U.S. Navy, 1917–1918.
- The third USCGC Onondaga (WPG-79) was a United States Coast Guard cutter in commission from 1934 to 1947, and operated as part of the Navy from 1941 to 1945.
