= Gen. Orrin Hutchinson House =

Historic house in New York, United States

- Hutchinson, Gen. Orrin, House
- U.S. National Register of Historic Places
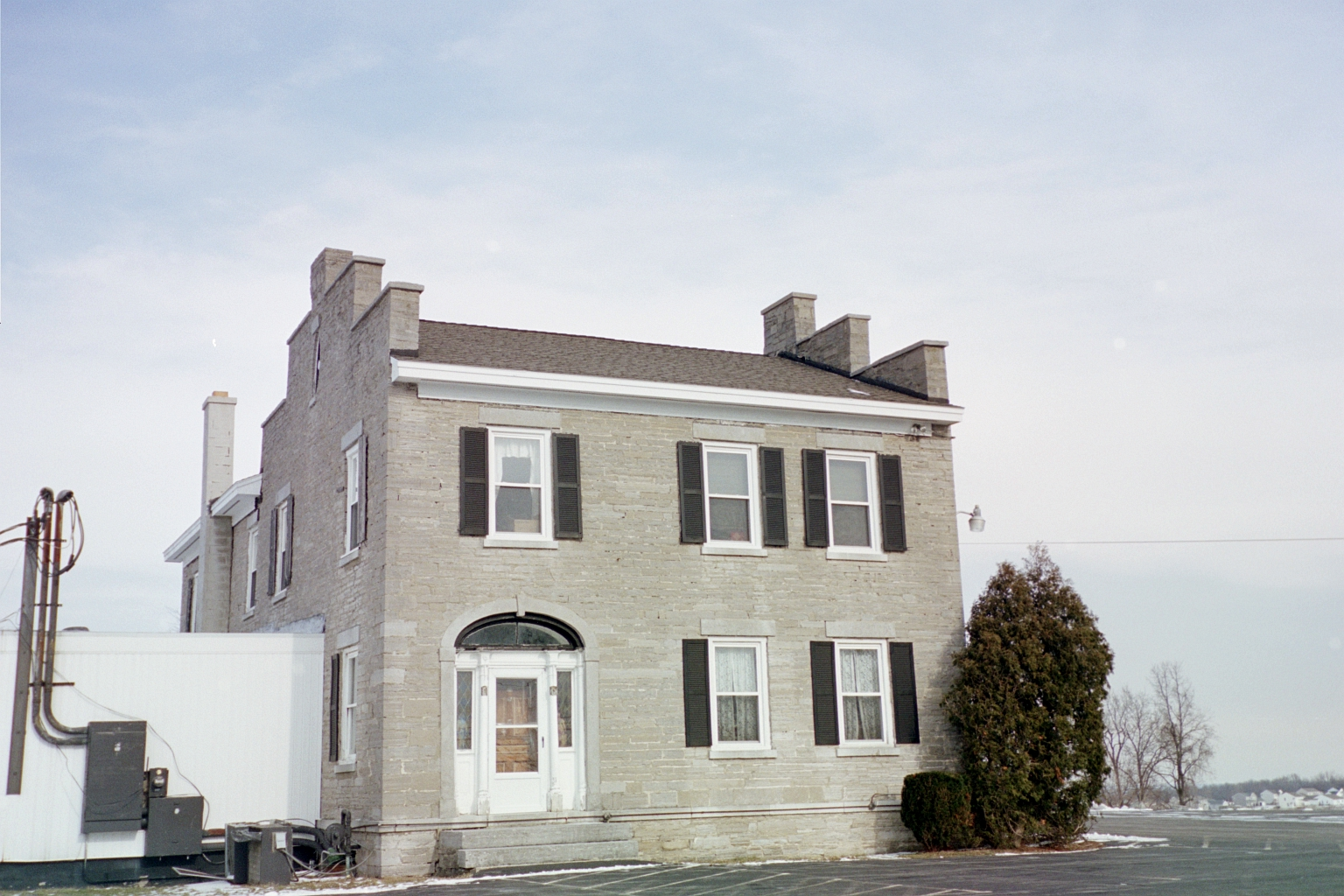

- Location within New York Location within the United States
- Location: Onondaga, New York
- Coordinates: 42°59′40.96″N 76°12′57.03″W
- Built: 1812
- NRHP reference No.: 73001233
- Added to NRHP: April 13, 1973

The Gen. Orrin Hutchinson House, also known as the General George Hutchinson House, is the only Town of Onondaga site listed on the National Register of Historic Places.

Orrin Hutchinson was a Brigadier General of the militia. He died in 1842. He served as supervisor of the Town of Onondaga.

The house is located at 4311 West Seneca Turnpike. It has operated as a restaurant for many years. At one time the restaurant was called "The General Hutchinson House"; later it was renamed "The Inn of the Seasons".

It was constructed around 1812, and shows Dutch and other architectural influences.

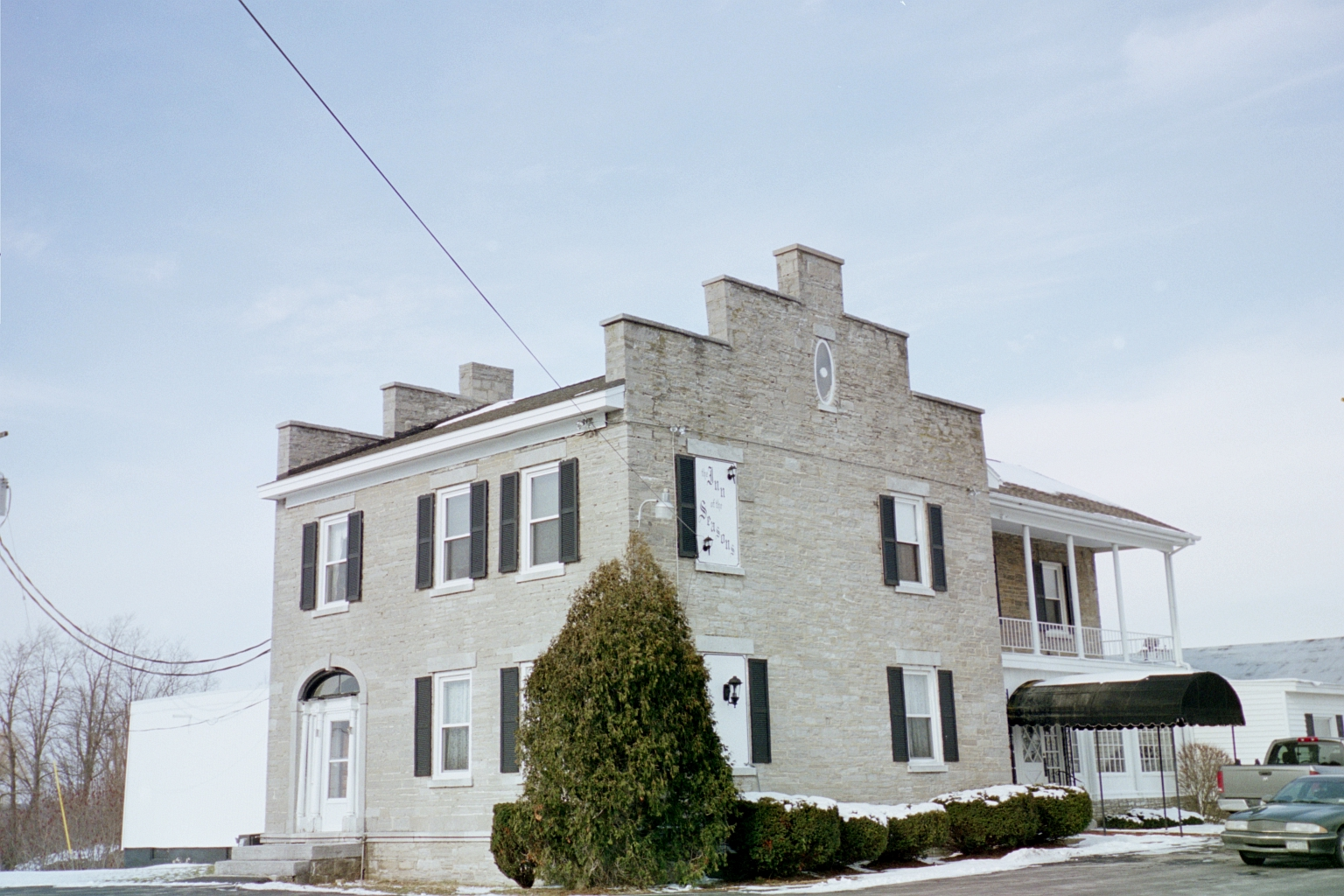
Restaurant entrance of the General Hutchinson House
