= Alvord House =

Historic house in New York, United States

- U.S. National Register of Historic Places
- New York State Register of Historic Places
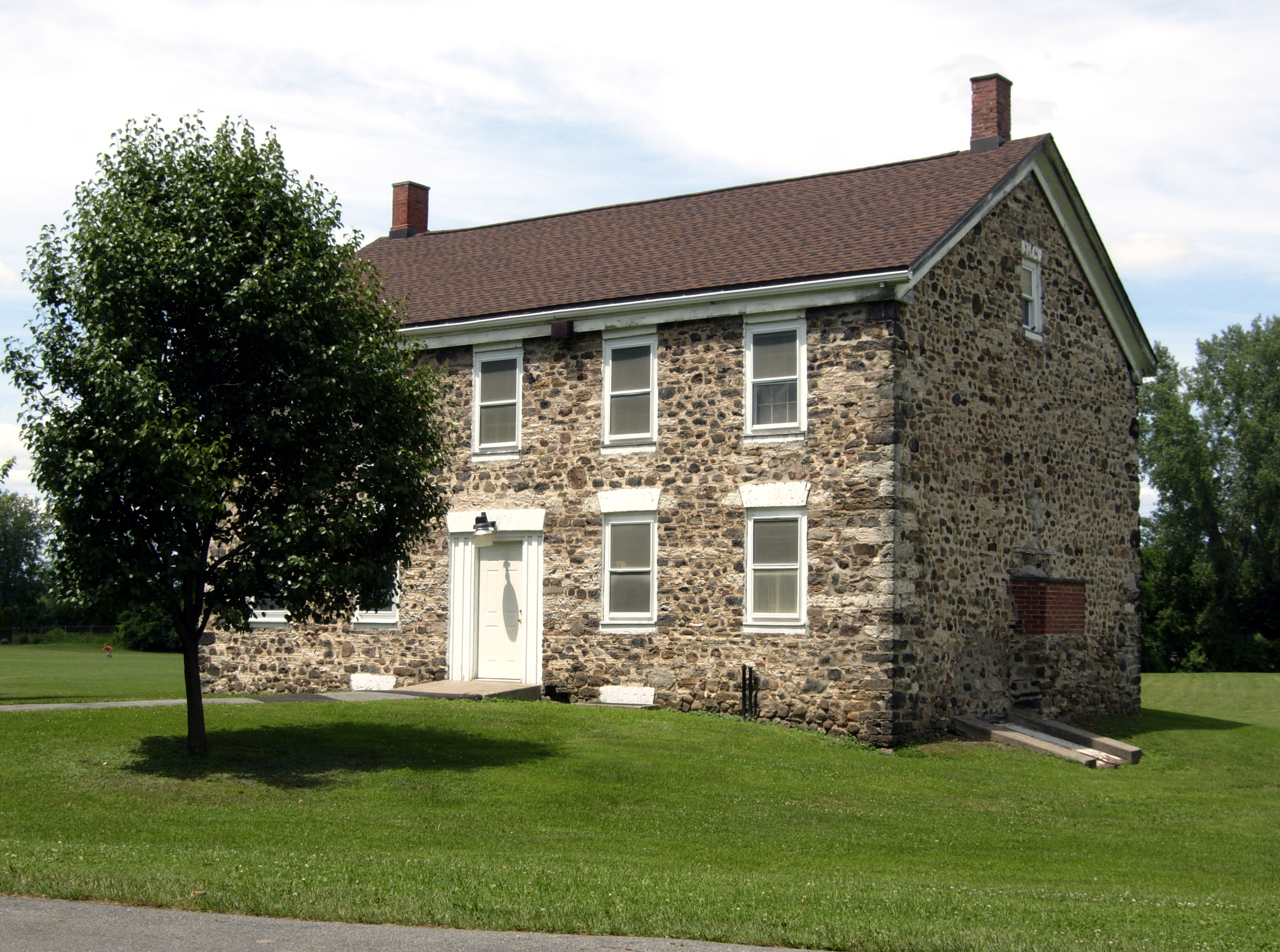

- Location within New York Location within the United States
- Location: Salina, New York
- Coordinates: 43°5′19.5″N 76°7′59.2″W
- Area: 9.5 acres (38,000 m^{2})
- Built: 1835
- NRHP reference No.: 76001257
- NYSRHP No.: 06715.000003

Significant dates
- Added to NRHP: August 27, 1976
- Designated NYSRHP: June 23, 1980

The Alvord House is a historic stone farmhouse in the town of Salina, New York, just north of Syracuse. The Alvord family were merchants in the then-emerging salt manufacturing business in the Salina area in the early 19th century. In 1835, this house was constructed on what was then a large tract of farmland. It was the main house amongst a small cluster of other homes and outbuildings on the family farm. Presently, the stone house is all that remains of the Alvord estate. It is contained within a small public park in the hamlet of Lyncourt. The house was added to the National Register of Historic Places in 1976.

== See also ==
- List of Registered Historic Places in Onondaga County, New York
