= Lyncourt, New York =

- Census-designated place
- Location in Onondaga County and the state of New York.
- Coordinates: 43°4′49″N 76°7′21″W
- Country: United States
- State: New York
- County: Onondaga

Area
  - Total: 1.25 sq mi (3.24 km^{2})
  - Land: 1.25 sq mi (3.24 km^{2})
  - Water: 0 sq mi (0.00 km^{2})
- Elevation: 446 ft (136 m)

Population (2020)
  - Total: 4,376
  - Density: 3,496.1/sq mi (1,349.85/km^{2})
- Time zone: UTC-5 (Eastern (EST))
  - Summer (DST): UTC-4 (EDT)
- ZIP code: 13208
- Area code: 315
- FIPS code: 36-43885
- GNIS feature ID: 1867409

Lyncourt is a suburb (and census-designated place) in Onondaga County, New York, United States. As of the 2020 census, the population was 4,376.

Lyncourt is located in the town of Salina. The mailing address is in Syracuse, NY.

== Geography ==
Lyncourt is located at 43°4′49″N 76°7′21″W (43.080266, -76.122450).

According to the United States Census Bureau, the CDP has a total area of 1.2 square miles (3.1 km^{2}), all land.

== Demographics ==
Historical population
Census	Pop.	Note	%±
2000	4,420		—
2010	4,250		−3.8%
2020	4,376		3.0%
U.S. Decennial Census

=== 2020 census ===
As of the 2020 census, Lyncourt had a population of 4,376. The median age was 41.4 years. 19.6% of residents were under the age of 18 and 17.9% of residents were 65 years of age or older. For every 100 females there were 92.2 males, and for every 100 females age 18 and over there were 85.2 males age 18 and over.

100.0% of residents lived in urban areas, while 0.0% lived in rural areas.

There were 1,945 households in Lyncourt, of which 25.3% had children under the age of 18 living in them. Of all households, 32.2% were married-couple households, 21.4% were households with a male householder and no spouse or partner present, and 37.2% were households with a female householder and no spouse or partner present. About 38.0% of all households were made up of individuals and 15.1% had someone living alone who was 65 years of age or older.

There were 2,047 housing units, of which 5.0% were vacant. The homeowner vacancy rate was 0.7% and the rental vacancy rate was 5.4%.

Racial composition as of the 2020 census
Race	Number	Percent
White	3,134	71.6%
Black or African American	421	9.6%
American Indian and Alaska Native	33	0.8%
Asian	355	8.1%
Native Hawaiian and Other Pacific Islander	1	0.0%
Some other race	72	1.6%
Two or more races	360	8.2%
Hispanic or Latino (of any race)	217	5.0%

=== 2000 census ===
As of the 2000 census, there were 4,268 people, 1,913 households, and 1,126 families residing in the CDP. The population density was 3,445.9 inhabitants per square mile (1,330.5/km^{2}). There were 2,009 housing units at an average density of 1,622.0 per square mile (626.3/km^{2}). The racial makeup of the CDP was 94.35% White, 2.84% African American, 0.66% Native American, 0.37% Asian, 0.05% Pacific Islander, 0.40% from other races, and 1.34% from two or more races. Hispanic or Latino of any race were 0.94% of the population.

There were 1,913 households, out of which 24.0% had children under the age of 18 living with them, 41.8% were married couples living together, 12.5% had a female householder with no husband present, and 41.1% were non-families. 34.8% of all households were made up of individuals, and 15.4% had someone living alone who was 65 years of age or older. The average household size was 2.23 and the average family size was 2.89.

In the CDP, the population was spread out, with 21.0% under the age of 18, 5.6% from 18 to 24, 29.4% from 25 to 44, 21.9% from 45 to 64, and 22.1% who were 65 years of age or older. The median age was 41 years. For every 100 females, there were 90.5 males. For every 100 females age 18 and over, there were 87.3 males.

The median income for a household in the CDP was $32,774, and the median income for a family was $42,105. Males had a median income of $34,044 versus $25,205 for females. The per capita income for the CDP was $18,482. About 6.1% of families and 10.0% of the population were below the poverty line, including 12.7% of those under age 18 and 5.1% of those age 65 or over.

=== Demographic estimates ===
In the mid to late twentieth century, Lyncourt was the biggest destination for Italian American families looking to migrate to the suburbs. This continued until the early twenty first century, until an eventual slowdown. Still, over 3% of people living in Lyncourt speak both Italian and English, this is greater than 99% of the country. During the early 2000s, Lyncourt was one of the most densely populated Italian American areas in the nation. This culture has greatly influenced the neighborhood, as many families still hold on to their ancestry practices.

== Government ==
Lyncourt is part of the Town of Salina. The Town is broken up into four wards. Town officials include:

- Raul Huerta, Supervisor
- Hayley Downs, 1st Ward Councilor
- Lisa Paul, 2nd Ward Councilor
- Page Steinhardt, 3rd Ward Councilor
- Eliza Driscoll, 4th Ward Councilor

== Emergency Services ==
Police protection is provided by the Onondaga County Sheriffs Office and the New York State Police. Fire protection is provided by the Lyncourt Volunteer Fire Department. Their fire station is located at 2909 Court Street and is currently being run by Chief Lewis St. Andrew. Ambulance service is provided by both AMR Ambulance and EAVES Ambulance.

== Education ==
Most of Lyncourt census-designated place is part of the Lyncourt Union-Free School District . This school district serves approximately 420 students in grades K-8. The school district has agreements with Solvay Union Free School District and East Syracuse Minoa Central School District that allows students from Lyncourt to attend either high school.

Portions of the CDP are in East Syracuse-Minoa Central School District and Liverpool Central School District.
