= Alvord (surname) =

Alvord is a surname. Notable people with the surname include:

- Austin D. Alvord (1843–1924), American politician
- Benjamin Alvord (mathematician) (1813–1884), American soldier, mathematician, and botanist
- Benjamin Alvord Jr. (1860–1927), son of the above, American soldier, U.S. general during World War I
- Billy Alvord (1863–1927), American baseball player
- Burt Alvord, an Arizona marshal and later outlaw
- Clarence Walworth Alvord (1868–1928), American historian.
- Edith Vosburgh Alvord (1875–1962), American suffragist
- Edward Jesup Alvord (1831–1868), American lawyer and politician
- Henry Elijah Alvord (1844–1904), American university administrator and educator
- James C. Alvord (1808–1839), U.S. Representative from Massachusetts
- Lori Alvord (born 1958), American doctor
- Thomas G. Alvord (1810–1897), American lawyer, merchant and politician
- Tiffany Alvord (born 1992), singer/songwriter and YouTube celebrity
- William Alvord (1833–1904) American merchant, banker and political leader
