= Liverpool Central School District =

School district in New York, United States

Location
- Liverpool, NY United States

District information
- Type: Public Primary
- Motto: "Preparing Our Students for Tomorrow... Today"
- Grades: K–12
- Superintendent: Richard Chapman
- Schools: 13
- Budget: $173M

Students and staff
- Students: 6,800
- Teachers: 630
- District mascot: Legends
- Colors: Orange and Blue

Other information
- Website: liverpool.k12.ny.us

Liverpool Central School District is a public school district in a suburban community near Syracuse, New York in Onondaga County. It has eight elementary schools, four middle schools and Liverpool High School with a district enrollment of about 7,033 students. Liverpool Central School District serves the entire Village of Liverpool and portions of the towns of Clay and Salina. Richard Chapman is the Superintendent of Schools.

== Board of education ==
The Liverpool Central School district's Board of Education consists of nine community-elected volunteers who meet twice a month to determine the running of the district. They are the major policymakers and must approve a majority of district issues before they can be handled or instituted. As per the Open Meetings Act, all BOE meetings are open to the public and meeting minutes are posted online.

=== Current Board Members ===
The Board's current members are:

- Nicholas Blaney, President
- Stacey Chilbert, Vice President
- Jecenia Bresett
- Alexandra Gyder
- Matt Jones
- Kimberly Martin
- Dan McKeever
- Kimberly Melnik
- John Solazzo

=== Student Liaisons ===
Liverpool High School students serve as liaisons to the Board of Education for a two-year term. The students have no voting power but give insight to student affairs. The current student liaisons are: Nneamaka Nwaezeapu and Aidan Lloyd.

=== District Administrators ===
The district is run by a series of administrators, all of whom are responsible for providing pertinent information related to their subject field at board meetings. They work under the superintendent.

==== Assistant Superintendents ====
- Brett Woodcock, Assistant Superintendent for Human Resources

==== Executive Directors and Directors of Programs ====
- Amy DiVita, Executive Director of Special Education
- Jason Armstrong, Executive Director for Elementary Education
- Michael Baroody, Executive Director of Secondary Education
- Dana Ziegler, Executive Director for Humanities and Middle Level Education
- Briana O'Brien, Executive Principal (High School)
- Kasey Dolson, Executive Director for Math, Science and Technology
- Kimberly Vile, Assistant Superintendent of Business Administration
- Jennifer DiBianco, Director of Student Services
- Harmony Booker-Balintfy, Director of Staff Services
- Teresa Bowers, Director of Special Education (Elementary)
- Jennifer Fragola, Directory of Special Education (Secondary)
- Daniel Farsaci, Director of Technology
- Adam Shatraw, Director of Fine Arts
- Ari Liberman, Director of Health, Physical Education and Athletics
- Annette Marchbanks, Director of Food Service
- D'Allah Laffoon, Director of Transportation
- Darrell Clisson, Director of Facilities
- Melissa Berlinski, Director of Security

== Schools ==
=== Elementary schools ===
- Chestnut Hill Elementary (3-5, South Quadrant)
- Donlin Drive Elementary (K-2, South Quadrant)
- Elmcrest Elementary (K-2, Central Quadrant)
- Liverpool Elementary (3-5, Village Quadrant)
- Long Branch Elementary (K-2, Village Quadrant)
- Morgan Road Elementary (3-5, Central Quadrant)
- Soule Road Elementary (3-5, North Quadrant)
- Willow Field Elementary (K-2, North Quadrant)

=== Middle schools ===
- Chestnut Hill Middle School (6-8, South Quadrant)
- Liverpool Middle School (6-8, Village Quadrant)
- Morgan Road Middle School (6-8, Central Quadrant)
- Soule Road Middle School (6-8, North Quadrant)

=== High school ===
- Liverpool High School (9-12) (article)

=== Former Schools ===
- Craven Crawford Elementary - Closed as a school after the 2001-2002 school year, became the District Office
- A.V. Zogg Middle School - Closed after 1980-1981 school year to be used as district offices. It has since been bought and sold several times, including by the Liverpool Community Church. It is currently owned by Syracuse Studios, a film production services company, and film production company American High has produced four feature films in the building.
- Mark Loveless Elementary - now the Town of Salina offices.
- Wetzel Road Elementary - closed due to budget cuts at the end of the 2009-2010 school year. As a part of the Liverpool Central School District’s Education 2020 initiative, the building was renovated and now goes by the Wetzel Road CTE Academy, housing Career and Technical Education classes for Liverpool High School. Wetzel Road CTE Academy opened on September 8th, 2026.
- Liverpool High School Annex (9th grade building, referred to as LHX) - closed at the end of the 2020-2021 school year and is now Morgan Road Middle School.
- Nate Perry Elementary - closed at the end of the 2021-2022 school year. The building is now the Citizenship & Science Academy of Syracuse.
