= Anthony Walker (politician) =

American politician (born 1965)

Member of the Missouri House of Representatives from the 58th District
- In office March 29, 2002 – January 8, 2003
- Preceded by: Louis Ford
- Succeeded by: Rodney Hubbard

Personal details
- Born: Anthony Walker; February 11, 1965 (age 61) Queens, New York City, New York, U.S.
- Party: Democratic
- Education: Liverpool High School; St. Louis Metropolitan Police Academy

Anthony Earl "Ford" Walker (born February 11, 1965) is an American politician, administrator, and sheriff deputy who served as a member of the Missouri House of Representatives from the 58th district for a brief period between April 2002 and January 2003.

== Early life and career ==
Anthony Walker was born February 11, 1965, in Queens, New York and attended Liverpool High School. His mother Ida Ford, married Louis Ford who had represented the 58th district from 1982 until 2002. His sister is former St. Louis City Alderman and former DNC delegate April Ford-Griffin.

Prior to his election, Walker was a sheriff's deputy within the 22nd Judicial Circuit Court, having graduated from the St. Louis Metropolitan Police Academy.

== Missouri State House ==
=== Special election and tenure ===
His stepfather, Louis Ford, resigned from office 9 months in advance in order to bypass term limits and allowed Walker to be elected in a special election. At the Democratic Party's nominating convention, Walker defeated state government employee Rodney Hubbard for the nomination. Walker used his father's last name as a nickname in order to take advantage of voter familiarity. He faced former Democrat and community activist Isaiah Hair Jr. in the general election, winning on March 26 with over 75% of the vote. Walker was on a total of six committees and sponsored zero bills during his nine-month tenure.

=== August Democratic primary ===
Rodney L. Hubbard was the first individual to consider a potential primary challenge to Walker, and entered the race shortly before the special election. Ford drew a total of two other primary challengers, those being former St. Louis School Board member and perennial candidate Bill Haas, businessman and educator Paris Bouchard Relator. The St. Louis Post Dispatch endorsed Relator, naming him the "strongest candidate". Isaiah Hair Jr. was again the Republican nominee.

Relator unsuccessfully attempted to contest the results, claiming that there were irregularities in the results, but was unsuccessful. Hubbard won the general election with 89% of the vote.

== Electoral history ==
March 26, 2002 Missouri House of Representatives District 58 special election
| Party | Candidate | Votes | % |
|---|---|---|---|
| Democratic | Anthony "Ford" Walker | 250 | 75.76% |
| Republican | Isaiah Hair Jr. | 80 | 24.24% |
| Total votes | | 330 | 100% |

2002 Missouri House of Representatives District 58, Democratic Primary
| Party | Candidate | Votes | % |
|---|---|---|---|
| Democratic | Rodney Hubbard | 1,266 | 34.83% |
| Democratic | Paris Bouchard Relator | 1,226 | 33.73% |
| Democratic | Anthony "Ford" Walker | 784 | 21.57% |
| Democratic | Bill Haas | 359 | 9.88% |
| Total votes | | 3,635 | 100% |
