= Salina, New York =

- Town
- Location in Onondaga County and the state of New York.
- Coordinates: 43°6′6″N 76°10′13″W
- Country: United States
- State: New York
- County: Onondaga

Government
  - Type: Town council
  - Town supervisor: Nick Paro (R)
  - Town council: Members: • W1: Hayley Downs (D); • W2: (R); • W3: (R); • W4: David Carnie (R)

Area
  - Total: 15.06 sq mi (39.01 km^{2})
  - Land: 13.75 sq mi (35.61 km^{2})
  - Water: 1.31 sq mi (3.40 km^{2})
- Elevation: 433 ft (132 m)

Population (2020)
  - Total: 33,233
  - Density: 2,417/sq mi (933.2/km^{2})
- Time zone: UTC-5 (Eastern (EST))
  - Summer (DST): UTC-4 (EDT)
- ZIP code: 13088, 13090, 13211, 13212, 13206, 13208
- Area code: 315
- FIPS code: 36-64815
- GNIS feature ID: 0979453
- Website: salina.ny.us

Salina is a town in Onondaga County, New York, United States. As of the 2020 census, the population was 33,223. The name of the town is derived from the Latin word for "salt." Salina is a northern suburb of Syracuse.

== History ==
The region was in the domain of the Onondaga tribe and later was within the Central New York Military Tract, although it was reserved for members of the Onondaga.

Salina received its name in 1797, when the surveyor general received authority to set aside a portion of the Salt Reservation for use in salt manufacture. The salt reservation had been created by a treaty with the Native Americans. It extended one mile around Onondaga Lake. In 1798, the village of Salina was chartered. It was located in what is now the Washington Square neighborhood, or first ward, of what became the city of Syracuse; it contained sixteen blocks. Each block was divided into four house lots, selling according to law, for no less than forty dollars. The area now known as the town of Salina was still part of the towns of Manlius and Marcellus. In March 1809, the town of Salina was organized. It included the areas later known as the town Geddes (formed 1848), part of Manlius and the city of Syracuse.

Salina's location on the Erie Canal stimulated its industrial development. The middle section of the canal, from Salina to Utica was the first to open, in 1820, and elaborate celebrations were held.

It was not until the late 1840s that Salina was reduced to its present size. The original Town of Salina stretched around Onondaga Lake, incorporating part of what is now the Town of Geddes and much of what today is the City of Syracuse. The early history of Salina is actually the history of the area around Onondaga Lake and the salt industry.

By 1846, it was apparent that Syracuse would soon become a city. The residents of Salina and Syracuse began discussing a proposed charter, which would unify the two villages. In December 1847, the act of incorporation was passed, which defined the area as "constituting a part of the town of Salina and incorporation the village of Salina and Syracuse." This act reduced the town of Salina to its present boundaries.

Salina consists of five small suburban communities: Liverpool, Mattydale, Lyncourt, Galeville, and a portion of North Syracuse.

The Alvord House was listed on the National Register of Historic Places in 1976.

== Geography ==
According to the United States Census Bureau, the town has a total area of 15.1 square miles (39 km^{2}), of which 13.8 square miles (36 km^{2}) is land and 1.3 square miles (3.4 km^{2}) (8.74%) is water.

The town is on the northern shore of Onondaga Lake.

Interstate 81 and Interstate 90 (New York State Thruway) intersect in Salina. New York State Route 370 borders Onondaga Lake. U.S. Route 11 passes through the eastern part of the town.

== Demographics ==
Historical population
Census	Pop.	Note	%±
1820	1,814		—
1830	6,929		282.0%
1840	11,013		58.9%
1850	2,142		−80.6%
1860	2,400		12.0%
1870	2,688		12.0%
1880	2,888		7.4%
1890	3,490		20.8%
1900	3,745		7.3%
1910	3,208		−14.3%
1920	4,257		32.7%
1930	10,117		137.7%
1940	11,168		10.4%
1950	19,125		71.2%
1960	33,076		72.9%
1970	38,281		15.7%
1980	37,400		−2.3%
1990	35,145		−6.0%
2000	33,290		−5.3%
2010	33,710		1.3%
2020	33,233		−1.4%
U.S. Decennial Census

As of the census of 2000, there were 33,290 people, 14,401 households, and 8,871 families residing in the town. The population density was 2,415.7 inhabitants per square mile (932.7/km^{2}). There were 14,979 housing units at an average density of 1,086.9 per square mile (419.7/km^{2}). The racial makeup of the town was 93.87% White, 2.16% African American, 0.52% Native American, 1.60% Asian, 0.04% Pacific Islander, 0.41% from other races, and 1.40% from two or more races. Hispanic or Latino of any race were 1.40% of the population.

There were 14,401 households, out of which 26.0% had children under the age of 18 living with them, 46.4% were married couples living together, 11.1% had a female householder with no husband present, and 38.4% were non-families. 31.6% of all households were made up of individuals, and 12.8% had someone living alone who was 65 years of age or older. The average household size was 2.30 and the average family size was 2.91.

In the town, the population was spread out, with 21.7% under the age of 18, 7.0% from 18 to 24, 30.0% from 25 to 44, 23.2% from 45 to 64, and 18.1% who were 65 years of age or older. The median age was 39 years. For every 100 females, there were 90.1 males. For every 100 females age 18 and over, there were 86.6 males.

The median income for a household in the town was $40,500, and the median income for a family was $49,394. Males had a median income of $36,444 versus $27,179 for females. The per capita income for the town was $21,839. About 5.3% of families and 7.4% of the population were below the poverty line, including 10.2% of those under age 18 and 4.7% of those age 65 or over.

== Communities and locations in the Town of Salina ==
- The Alvord House – A stone farmhouse on the National Register of Historic Places.
- Elmcrest – A community by the northwestern corner of the town.
- Galeville – A suburb of Syracuse by the eastern town line and by the junction of I-81 and I-90.
- Ley Creek – A stream that forms part of the eastern town boundary.
- Liverpool – The Village of Liverpool is on NY-370 in the northwest of Salina.
- Lyncourt – A hamlet.
- Mattydale – A suburb of Syracuse in the eastern part of Salina.
- Hinsdale-- A community north of Mattydale and next to the airport.
- Long Branch – A community by Onondaga Lake in the northwestern part of Salina.
- North Syracuse – Part of the Village of North Syracuse.
- Pitcher Hill – A suburban community on the northern town line, west of the airport.
- Syracuse Hancock International Airport – Part of the regional airport is in the northeastern part of Salina.
