= Alvord, West Virginia =

Unincorporated community in West Virginia, United States

Alvord
- Unincorporated community
- Location within the state of West Virginia Alvord (the United States)
- Coordinates: 38°48′27″N 81°20′56″W
- Country: United States
- State: West Virginia
- County: Roane
- Elevation: 781 ft (238 m)
- Time zone: UTC-5 (Eastern (EST))
  - Summer (DST): UTC-4 (EDT)
- GNIS ID: 1553723

Alvord is an unincorporated community in Roane County, West Virginia, United States.
