= Onondaga Hill, New York =

Onondaga Hill Sgajihgwani·yoñ·daʼ (Onondaga)
- hamlet
- Location within the state of New York
- Coordinates: 43°0′17″N 76°11′0″W
- Country: United States
- State: New York
- County: Onondaga
- Time zone: UTC-5 (Eastern (EST))
  - Summer (DST): UTC-4 (EDT)

Onondaga Hill (Onondaga: Sgajihgwani·yoñ·daʼ) is a hamlet in the Town of Onondaga in Onondaga County, New York, United States, southwest of the city of Syracuse. It is located on the Seneca Turnpike at the intersection of New York State Route 173 and New York State Route 175.

Onondaga Hill was the location of the first Onondaga county courthouse, built in 1805 and in use as a school after the county seat moved to Syracuse in 1830. Until 2005, the hamlet was the location of Onondaga's town hall. The Onondaga Free Library and the Town of Onondaga Historical Society are in Onondaga Hill. Community General Hospital and Van Duyn Home and Hospital are located on the eastern edge of the hamlet, near the Syracuse city line. The main campus of Onondaga Community College lies on the hamlet's western edge. Onondaga Hill is populated mainly of middle-class families. The children of Onondaga Hill attend the Westhill Central Schools district.

== Notable persons ==
- David Muir, host of ABC World News Tonight.
- James Noxon, 19th Century New York State trial court judge, state senator, and Onondaga County lawyer.

== See also ==
- Onondaga Hill Middle School
