= Onondaga County, New York =

County in New York, United States

- County
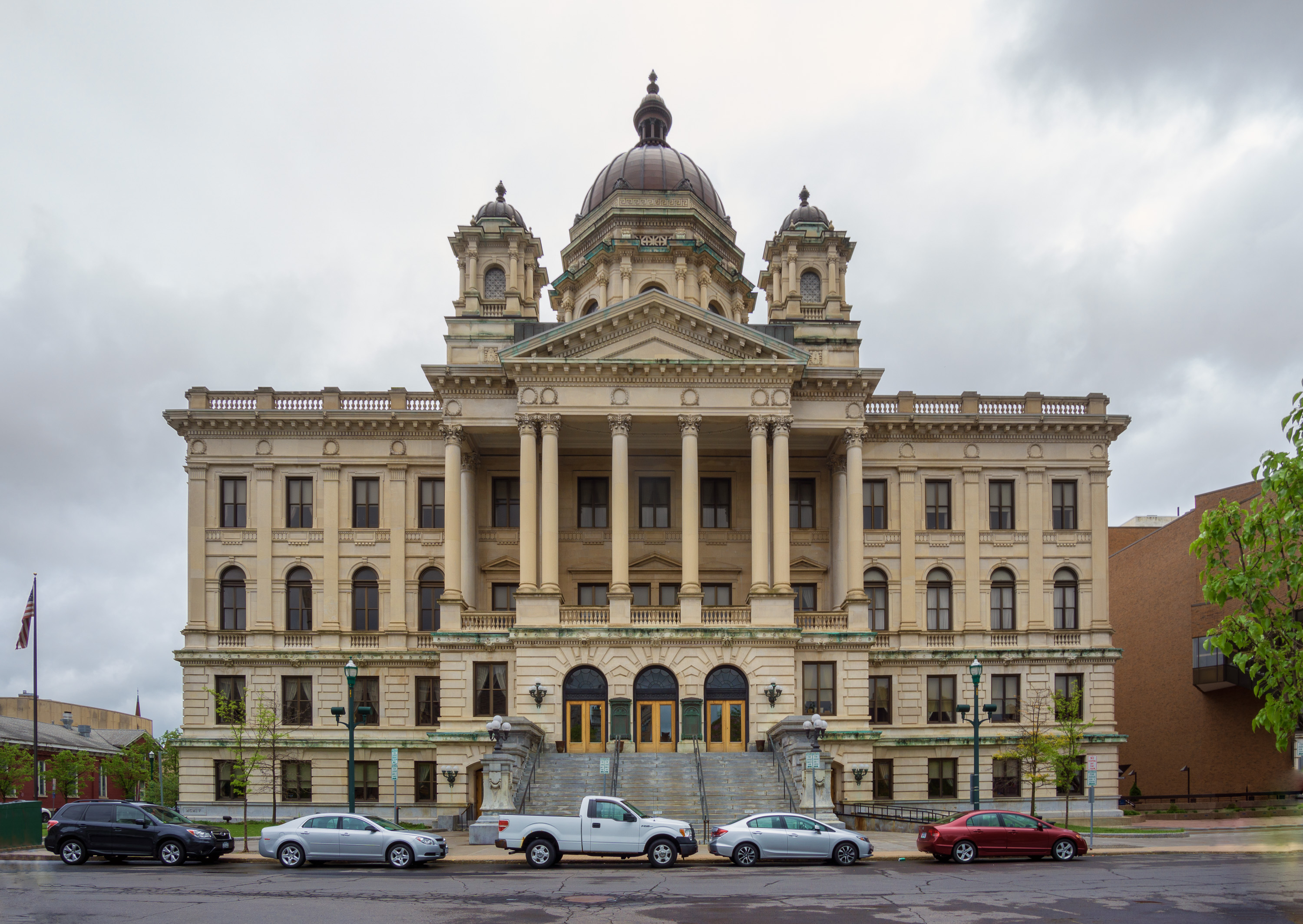
- Onondaga County Courthouse at Columbus Circle in Syracuse

- Flag Seal

- Location within the U.S. state of New York
- Coordinates: 43°01′N 76°12′W
- Country: United States
- State: New York
- Founded: 1794
- Named for: Onondaga people
- Seat: Syracuse
- Largest city: Syracuse

Government
  - County Executive: J. Ryan McMahon II (R)

Area
  - Total: 806 sq mi (2,090 km^{2})
  - Land: 778 sq mi (2,020 km^{2})
  - Water: 27 sq mi (70 km^{2}) 3.4%

Population (2020)
  - Total: 476,516
  - Estimate (2025): 466,584 ▼
  - Density: 600/sq mi (230/km^{2})
- Time zone: UTC−5 (Eastern)
  - Summer (DST): UTC−4 (EDT)
- Congressional district: 22nd
- Website: onondaga.gov

Onondaga County (/ˌɒnənˈdɔːɡə/ ON-ən-DAW-gə) is a county in the U.S. state of New York. As of the 2020 census, the population was 476,516. The county seat is Syracuse. Onondaga County is the core of the Syracuse Metropolitan Statistical Area. The county is part of the Central New York region of the state.

== History ==
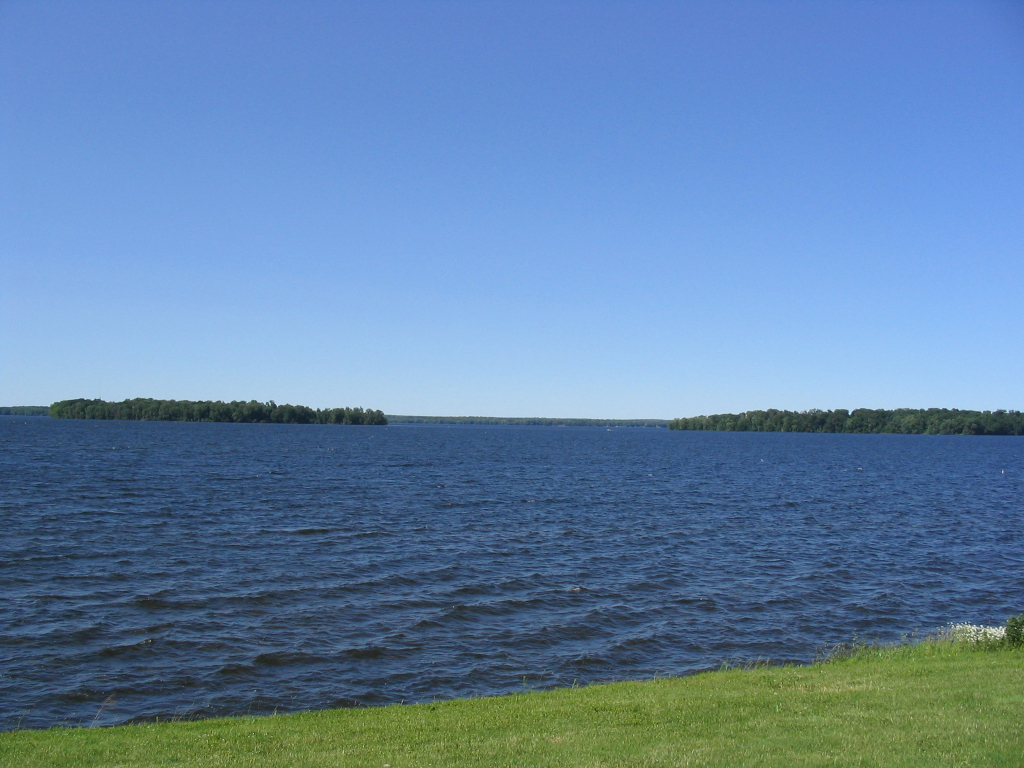
Oneida Lake borders Onondaga County to the northeast. It is the largest lake wholly within the state of New York. Photographed from Cicero, a northern suburban town in the northeast part of Onondaga County.

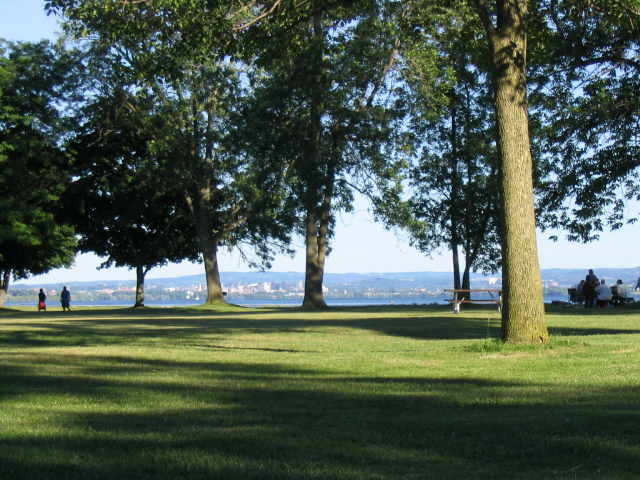
Onondaga Lake Park in the northern suburbs of Syracuse. Picture captures Onondaga Lake with the Syracuse skyline in the background

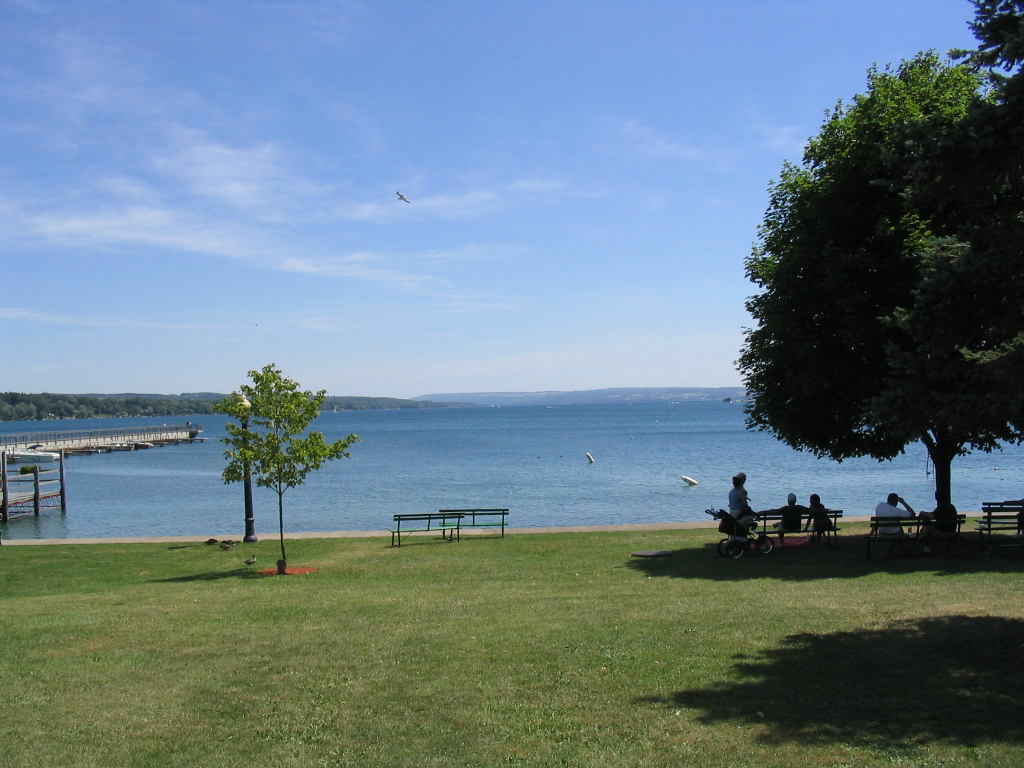
Skaneateles Lake is one of the Finger Lakes in Onondaga County.

The name Onondaga derives from the name of the Native American tribe indigenous to this area, one of the original Five Nations of the Haudenosaunee. They call themselves Onoñdaʼgegáʼ, sometimes spelled Onontakeka or Onondagaono. The word means "People of the Hills". The federally recognized Onondaga Nation has a 9.3 square miles (24 km^{2}) reservation within the county, on which they have self-government.

When counties were established in New York in 1683, the present Onondaga County was part of Albany County. This enormous county included the northern part of New York State as well as all of the present State of Vermont and, in theory, extended westward to the Pacific Ocean. It was reduced in size on July 3, 1766, by the creation of Cumberland County, and further on March 16, 1770, by the creation of Gloucester County, both containing territory now in Vermont.

On March 12, 1772, what was left of Albany County was split into three parts, one remaining under the name Albany County. One of the other pieces, Tryon County, contained the western portion (and thus, since no western boundary was specified, theoretically still extended west to the Pacific). The eastern boundary of Tryon County was approximately 5 miles (8 km) west of the present city of Schenectady, and the county included the western part of the Adirondack Mountains and the area west of the West Branch of the Delaware River. The area then designated as Tryon County now includes 37 counties of New York State. The county was named for William Tryon, colonial governor of New York.

In the years prior to 1776, most of the Loyalists in Tryon County fled to Canada. The Onondaga were among four Iroquois tribes that allied with the British against the American colonists, as they hoped to end their encroachment. Instead, they were forced to cede most of their land in New York to the United States after the war. Many Onondaga went with Joseph Brant and other nations to Canada, where they received land grants in compensation and formed the Six Nations of the Grand River First Nation.

In 1784, after a peace treaty ended the American Revolutionary War, the name of Tryon County was changed to Montgomery County. It honored General Richard Montgomery, who had captured several places in Canada and died attempting to capture the city of Quebec, and replaced the name of the hated British governor. In 1789, Montgomery County was reduced by the splitting off of Ontario County from Montgomery. The actual area split off from Montgomery County was much larger than the present county, also including the present Allegany, Cattaraugus, Chautauqua, Erie, Genesee, Livingston, Monroe, Niagara, Orleans, Steuben, Wyoming, Yates, and part of Schuyler and Wayne Counties.

In 1791, Herkimer County was one of three counties split off from Montgomery (the other two being Otsego, and Tioga County). This was much larger than the present county, however, and was reduced by a number of subsequent splits. In 1794, Onondaga County was split off from Herkimer County. This county was larger than the current Onondaga County, including the present Cayuga, Cortland, and part of Oswego Counties. In 1799, Cayuga County was split off from Onondaga. In 1808, Cortland County was split off from Onondaga. In 1816, parts of Oneida and Onondaga Counties were taken to form the new Oswego County. At the time Onondaga County was organized, it was divided into eleven towns: Homer, Pompey, Manlius, Lysander, Marcellus, Ulysses, Milton, Scipio, Ovid, Aurelius and Romulus.

Central New York developed rapidly after the New Military Tract provided land in lieu of payment to Revolutionary War veterans. Migration was largely from the east, mostly from New England states. The Genesee Road, which became the Seneca Turnpike in 1800, provided access. Generally settlers preferred higher land, since they associated lowlands with disease. Over time, as early clearing and farming eroded hillside soil, valley lands were more fertile and highly prized for agriculture as well as for water power, which was the origin of many communities. An early settler of 1823 was James Hutchinson Woodworth, a native of Washington County, NY. He helped clear land for his family's farm in this region before he moved to Chicago where he became Mayor. The completion of the Erie Canal across New York state in 1825 accelerated trade, development and migration.

The city of Syracuse, New York developed relatively late due to its marshy environment. It was incorporated as a village in 1825 and as a city in 1847; by contrast, the Village of Manlius, along the Cherry Valley and Seneca Turnpikes, was incorporated in 1813. The population of these rural towns was greatest in the late nineteenth century, when more people cultivated land and farms were relatively small, supporting large households.

Since that time, agriculture has declined in the county. Some Onondaga County towns like Spafford were largely depopulated and many villages became veritable ghost towns. Onondaga County highlands now are more heavily reforested, with public parks and preserves providing recreation. Two Finger Lakes in the county, Skaneateles and Otisco, also attract visitors. The village of Skaneateles on scenic Route 20 has become a major tourist destination.

At the turn of the twenty-first century, population declined in the City of Syracuse while suburban communities generally grew, particularly with tract developments north of the city. Elsewhere, scattered commuter houses appeared, generally on fairly large parcels. The rapid development of the village of Skaneateles and shores of Skaneateles Lake led to increased demand for property and property values.

== Geography ==
According to the U.S. Census Bureau, the county has an area of 806 square miles (2,090 km^{2}), of which 778 square miles (2,020 km^{2}) is land and 27 square miles (70 km^{2}) (3.4%) is water. The geographic dimensions of the county are illustrated as approximately 35 miles (56 km) in length and 30 miles (48 km) in width, and comprising 25 miles (40 km) of the New York State Barge Canal System, in combination with a number of lakes, streams and rivers. Onondaga County is in the central portion of New York State, west of Albany and Utica, east of Rochester and northeast of Ithaca. Onondaga Lake is bordered by many of the larger communities in the county. The highest point in Onondaga County is at 2057 feet, along Morgan Hill located just east of Morgan Hill State Forest on private property. The second highest point in Onondaga County is at 2019 feet elevation and on the summit of Fellows Hill which is located in Morgan Hill State Forest near Fabius and Apulia south of state route 80.

The northern part of the county is fairly level lake plain, extending northward to Lake Ontario. Oneida Lake three rivers, as well as the Erie and subsequent Barge Canals are in the lake plain. The main line of the New York Central Railroad and the New York State Thruway extend east and west across the county through the lake plain. The southern part of the county is Appalachian Plateau, with high hills rising at the southern edge of Syracuse. This is the eastern part of the Finger Lakes region. Skaneateles Lake and Otisco Lake are both in Onondaga County. US 20 extends east and west across the county, traversing dramatic hill-and-valley terrain. Between the lake plain and Appalachian highlands is a zone noted for drumlins, smaller, scattered hills formed as mounds of debris left by the last glacier. Tully is geologically noted for the terminal moraine deposited there by the glacier, filling the deep Tully Valley, which might have been another Finger Lake had the moraine been left closer to Syracuse, impounding water. Tully is at the divide between two major watersheds, one flowing northward to the Atlantic Ocean by way of the St. Lawrence River and the other southward to the ocean via the Susquehanna River. Oneida Lake, the Finger Lakes, and smaller bodies of water provide recreation. The Appalachian hills have several ski areas, waterfalls and historic villages as well as large parks and forest preserves.

=== Lakes and reservoirs ===
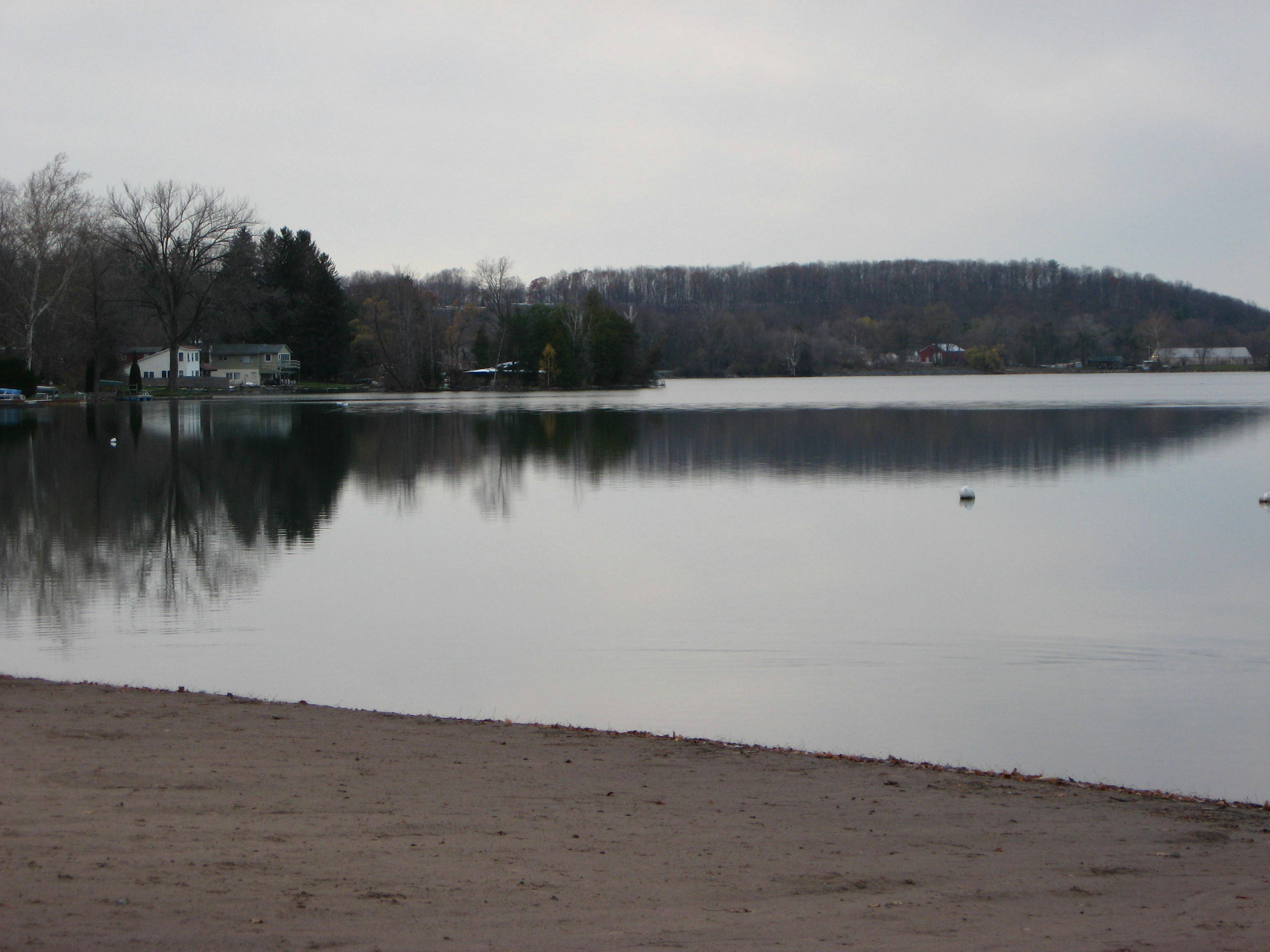
Jamesville Reservoir

- Jamesville Reservoir
- Oneida Lake
- Onondaga Lake
- Otisco Lake
- Skaneateles Lake

=== Adjacent counties ===
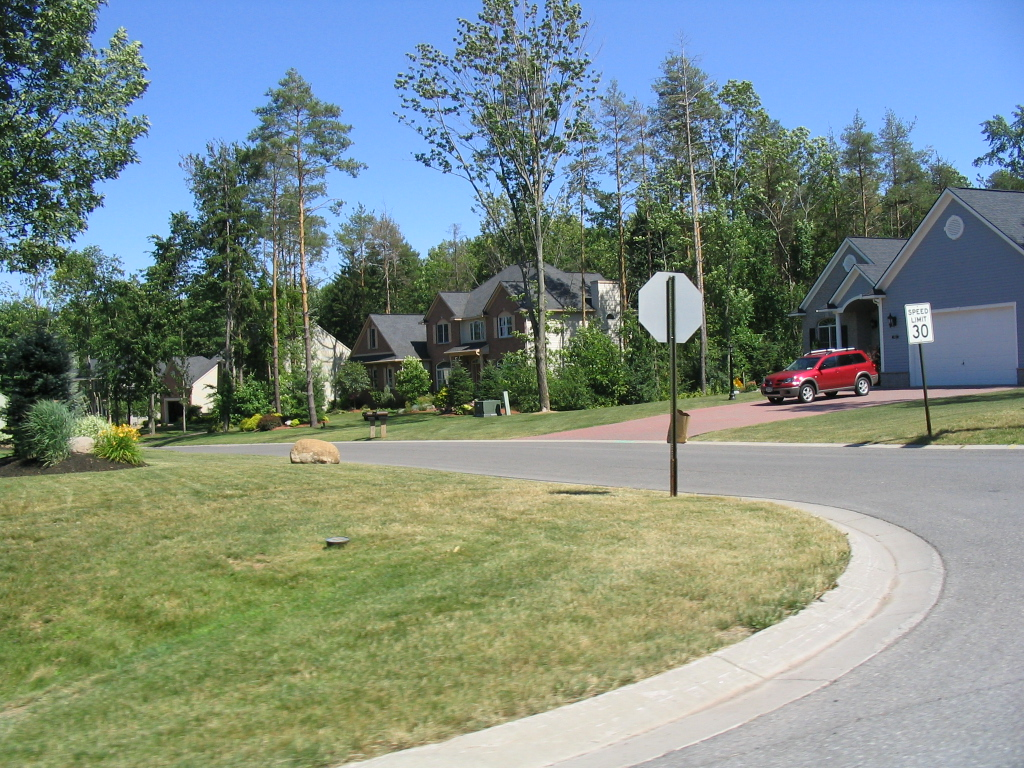
Lysander, a northwest suburb of Syracuse, New York

- Oswego County – north
- Madison County – east
- Cortland County – south
- Cayuga County – west

=== Major highways ===
- Interstate 81
- Interstate 90 (New York State Thruway)
- Interstate 690
- U.S. Route 11
- U.S. Route 20
- New York State Route 5
- New York State Route 31
- New York State Route 41
- New York State Route 92
- New York State Route 481 (Veterans Memorial Highway)
- New York State Route 690

== Demographics ==
Historical population
Census	Pop.	Note	%±
1800	7,406		—
1810	25,987		250.9%
1820	41,467		59.6%
1830	58,973		42.2%
1840	67,911		15.2%
1850	85,890		26.5%
1860	90,686		5.6%
1870	104,183		14.9%
1880	117,893		13.2%
1890	146,247		24.1%
1900	168,735		15.4%
1910	200,298		18.7%
1920	241,465		20.6%
1930	291,606		20.8%
1940	295,108		1.2%
1950	341,719		15.8%
1960	423,028		23.8%
1970	472,746		11.8%
1980	463,920		−1.9%
1990	468,973		1.1%
2000	458,336		−2.3%
2010	467,026		1.9%
2020	476,516		2.0%
2025 (est.)	466,584	▼	−2.1%
U.S. Decennial Census; 1790-1960 1900-1990; 1990-2000 2010-2019

=== 2020 census ===
Onondaga County, New York – Racial and ethnic composition Note: the US Census treats Hispanic/Latino as an ethnic category. This table excludes Latinos from the racial categories and assigns them to a separate category. Hispanics/Latinos may be of any race.
Race / Ethnicity (NH = Non-Hispanic)	Pop 1980	Pop 1990	Pop 2000	Pop 2010	Pop 2020	% 1980	% 1990	% 2000	% 2010	% 2020
White alone (NH)	421,864	414,524	383,599	370,040	347,290	90.93%	88.39%	83.69%	79.23%	72.88%
Black or African American alone (NH)	29,669	36,912	41,772	48,696	54,410	6.40%	7.87%	9.11%	10.43%	11.42%
Native American or Alaska Native alone (NH)	3,274	3,159	3,721	3,432	2,940	0.71%	0.67%	0.81%	0.73%	0.62%
Asian alone (NH)	2,814	6,702	9,512	14,370	20,119	0.61%	1.43%	2.08%	3.08%	4.22%
Native Hawaiian or Pacific Islander alone (NH)	x	x	120	120	106	x	x	0.03%	0.03%	0.02%
Other race alone (NH)	1,569	481	579	591	1,955	0.34%	0.10%	0.13%	0.13%	0.41%
Mixed race or Multiracial (NH)	x	x	7,858	10,948	23,124	x	x	1.71%	2.34%	4.85%
Hispanic or Latino (any race)	4,730	7,195	11,175	18,829	26,572	1.02%	1.53%	2.44%	4.03%	5.58%
Total	463,920	468,973	458,336	467,026	476,516	100.00%	100.00%	100.00%	100.00%	100.00%

=== 2000 census ===
As of the 2000 census, the county had 458,336 people, 181,153 households, and 115,394 families. The population density was 587 inhabitants per square mile (227/km^{2}). There were 196,633 housing units at an average density of 252 units per square mile (97/km^{2}). The county's racial makeup was 84.78% White, 9.38% African American, 0.86% Native American, 2.09% Asian, 0.03% Pacific Islander, 0.89% from other races, and 1.97% from two or more races. Hispanics or Latinos of any race were 2.44% of the population. About 17.5% were of Italian, 16.2% Irish, 12.4% German, 9.4% English, and 6.0% Polish ancestry, and 91.4% spoke English, 2.4% Spanish and 1.1% Italian as their first language.

Of the 181,153 households, 31.90% had children under age 18 living with them, 46.90% were married couples living together, 12.90% had a female householder with no husband present, and 36.30% were not families. About 29.40% of all households were made up of individuals, and 10.80% had someone living alone who was 65 years of age or older. The average household size was 2.46 and the average family size was 3.07.

25.80% of the county's population was under age 18, 9.50% was from age 18 to 24, 28.80% was from age 25 to 44, 22.10% was from age 45 to 64, and 13.80% was age 65 or older. The median age was 36 years. For every 100 females, there were 91.70 males. For every 100 females age 18 and over, there were 87.70 males.

The county's median household income was $40,847, and the median family income was $51,876. Males had a median income of $39,048 versus $27,154 for females. The county's per capita income was $21,336. About 8.60% of families and 12.20% of the population were below the poverty line, including 15.50% of those under age 18 and 7.10% of those age 65 or over.

== Education ==
Onondaga County is home to Syracuse University, a major research university and SUNY Upstate Medical University, a public medical school. Upstate Medical University is the largest producer of jobs in the region with a direct workforce of 10,959 employees.

Other higher educational institutions include SUNY Oswego's Syracuse Campus, Le Moyne College, SUNY College of Environmental Science and Forestry, Onondaga Community College, St. Joseph's College of Nursing, SUNY Empire State University's Syracuse campus, and several for-profit colleges.

K-12 school districts which cover parts of the county include:

- Baldwinsville Central School District
- Cato-Meridian Central School District
- Cazenovia Central School District
- Central Square Central School District
- Chittenango Central School District
- DeRuyter Central School District
- East Syracuse-Minoa Central School District
- Fabius-Pompey Central School District
- Fayetteville-Manlius Central School District
- Homer Central School District
- Jamesville-DeWitt Central School District
- Jordan-Elbridge Central School District
- LaFayette Central School District
- Liverpool Central School District
- Lyncourt Union Free School District
- Marcellus Central School District
- Moravia Central School District
- North Syracuse Central School District
- Onondaga Central School District
- Phoenix Central School District
- Skaneateles Central School District
- Solvay Union Free School District
- Syracuse City School District
- Tully Central School District
- West Genesee Central School District
- Westhill Central School District

== Economy ==
Micron Technology is constructing a US$ 100 billion complex due to the educational talent in Syracuse as well as its cool and moist climate. This complex consists of four megafab memory chip manufacturing buildings in the northern Syracuse suburb of Clay, New York, a project which, according to the company, will create "tens of thousands" of jobs.

== Government and politics ==
United States presidential election results for Onondaga County, New York
Year	Republican		Democratic		Third party(ies)	
Year	No.	%	No.	%	No.	%
1884	16,892	54.92%	13,166	42.81%	700	2.28%
1888	20,144	57.65%	14,001	40.07%	796	2.28%
1892	19,008	52.94%	14,900	41.50%	1,996	5.56%
1896	25,032	62.36%	13,695	34.12%	1,414	3.52%
1900	24,317	59.37%	14,698	35.89%	1,942	4.74%
1904	27,115	62.60%	14,633	33.78%	1,569	3.62%
1908	27,209	58.70%	16,643	35.90%	2,503	5.40%
1912	16,202	35.29%	15,827	34.47%	13,888	30.25%
1916	27,815	55.35%	19,892	39.58%	2,546	5.07%
1920	57,008	66.25%	23,308	27.09%	5,731	6.66%
1924	65,395	64.90%	24,773	24.58%	10,601	10.52%
1928	76,278	57.04%	54,706	40.91%	2,732	2.04%
1932	66,363	49.81%	62,227	46.71%	4,629	3.47%
1936	80,498	55.03%	62,945	43.03%	2,827	1.93%
1940	91,056	57.26%	67,481	42.44%	485	0.30%
1944	80,507	52.06%	73,562	47.57%	569	0.37%
1948	84,370	53.86%	66,295	42.32%	5,983	3.82%
1952	119,268	64.96%	64,022	34.87%	302	0.16%
1956	137,852	73.42%	49,918	26.58%	0	0.00%
1960	107,170	54.08%	90,836	45.84%	150	0.08%
1964	63,205	32.92%	128,630	66.99%	179	0.09%
1968	95,806	50.46%	83,576	44.02%	10,483	5.52%
1972	140,039	69.18%	61,895	30.58%	482	0.24%
1976	115,474	59.96%	76,097	39.51%	1,007	0.52%
1980	97,887	50.65%	73,453	38.00%	21,940	11.35%
1984	121,857	59.64%	81,777	40.03%	680	0.33%
1988	104,080	51.91%	94,751	47.26%	1,654	0.82%
1992	77,642	36.13%	90,645	42.18%	46,620	21.69%
1996	73,771	37.84%	100,190	51.40%	20,978	10.76%
2000	83,678	41.09%	109,896	53.97%	10,069	4.94%
2004	94,006	43.80%	116,381	54.23%	4,238	1.97%
2008	84,972	38.94%	129,317	59.25%	3,950	1.81%
2012	78,831	38.51%	122,254	59.72%	3,632	1.77%
2016	83,649	40.13%	112,337	53.89%	12,454	5.97%
2020	91,715	38.85%	138,991	58.88%	5,362	2.27%
2024	93,916	40.84%	133,155	57.91%	2,871	1.25%

=== Government ===
Onondaga County was governed exclusively by a board of supervisors until 1961, when voters approved the creation of the county executive. In 1968, the board reorganized into a 24-seat county legislature. In 2001, the legislature was reduced to 19 seats. In 2010, voters approved a measure to reduce the legislature to 17 seats. None of the legislative seats, nor the county executive's seat, are at-large. As of 2026, there are 10 Democrats and 7 Republicans. J. Ryan McMahon II (R) is the current County Executive.

Between its 1968 formation and 2025, Republicans held a majority in the legislature for all but two years (1978–1980). In November 2025 elections, Democrats gained control of the legislature and formed a 10–7 majority from January 2026. In November 2026 elections, Democrats gained several additional seats, increasing its dominance to a 14–3 supermajority.

=== Politics ===
Historically, Onondaga County was a Republican stronghold, like most of Central New York. From 1856 to 1988, the GOP carried the county in all but one presidential election, Lyndon B. Johnson's landslide in 1964. Since 1992, the county has gone Democratic in every presidential election, much like many urban counties around the country. However, it is a swing county in congressional, state and local races. Onondaga is entirely located within New York's 22nd congressional district, represented by Democrat John Mannion. Democratic strength is strongest in Syracuse itself, while Republicans do well in some suburbs.

Onondaga County Executives
Name	Party	Term
John H. Mulroy	Republican	January 1, 1962 – December 31, 1987
Nicholas J. Pirro	Republican	January 1, 1988 – December 31, 2007
Joanne M. Mahoney	Republican	January 1, 2008 – November 1, 2018
J. Ryan McMahon, II	Republican	November 1, 2018 – present

Onondaga County Legislature
District	Legislator	Party	Residence
1	Brian F. May, Minority Leader	Republican	Baldwinsville
2	Kevin J. Meaker	Republican	Clay
3	Timothy T. Burtis	Republican	Cicero
4	Jeremiah W. Thompson	Democratic	Liverpool
5	Ellen Block	Democratic	North Syracuse
6	Gregg Eriksen	Democratic	Skaneateles
7	Dan Romeo	Democratic	Syracuse
8	Chad M. Ryan	Democratic	Syracuse
9	Nicole Watts, Chair	Democratic	Syracuse
10	Elaine Denton	Democratic	Fayetteville
11	Richard McCarron	Republican	Syracuse
12	David H. Knapp	Republican	LaFayette
13	Ken Bush Jr.	Republican	Jordan
14	Cody M. Kelly	Republican	Clay
15	Maurice Brown	Democratic	Syracuse
16	Charles E. Garland	Democratic	Syracuse
17	Nodesia R. Hernandez, Majority Leader	Democratic	Syracuse

The sheriff of Onondaga County is Tobias Shelley. Along with Broome County, New York, Onondaga County was sued in 2017 over placing juvenile inmates in solitary confinement.

== Communities ==
A map of towns (white), the city (orange), and villages (yellow) in Onondaga County (Indian reservation colored purple)

Syracuse, the county seat, is the only city in Onondaga County. The following is a list of official towns, villages, and hamlets.

=== Population ranking ===
#	Location	Population	Type	Area
1	†Syracuse	148,620	City	Greater Syracuse
2	De Witt	11,247	CDP	Greater Syracuse
3	Fairmount	10,248	CDP	Greater Syracuse
4	Baldwinsville	7,898	Village	West
5	Radisson	7,038	CDP	North
6	North Syracuse	6,739	Village	North
7	Solvay	6,645	Village	Greater Syracuse
8	Mattydale	6,296	CDP	Greater Syracuse
9	Westvale	5,090	CDP	Greater Syracuse
10	Manlius	4,662	Village	East
11	Galeville	4,482	CDP	Greater Syracuse
12	Lyncourt	4,376	CDP	Greater Syracuse
13	Fayetteville	4,225	Village	East
14	‡Brewerton	3,907	CDP	North
15	Village Green	3,834	CDP	West
16	Minoa	3,657	Village	East
17	East Syracuse	3,078	Village	Greater Syracuse
18	Lakeland	2,556	CDP	Greater Syracuse
19	Skaneateles	2,533	Village	West
20	Liverpool	2,242	Village	Greater Syracuse
21	Nedrow	2,095	CDP	Greater Syracuse
22	Seneca Knolls	1,992	CDP	West
23	Marcellus	1,745	Village	West
24	‡Bridgeport	1,389	CDP	East
25	Camillus	1,222	Village	Greater Syracuse
26	Jordan	1,192	Village	West
27	Elbridge	921	Village	West
28	Tully	904	Village	South
29	Fabius	309	Village	South

† - County seat

‡ - Not entirely in Onondaga County

=== List of municipalities ===
==== Towns ====
- Camillus
- Cicero
- Clay
- DeWitt
- Elbridge
- Fabius
- Geddes
- LaFayette
- Lysander
- Manlius
- Marcellus
- Onondaga
- Otisco
- Pompey
- Salina
- Skaneateles
- Spafford
- Tully
- Van Buren

==== Hamlets ====
- Amber
- Apulia
- Borodino
- Cardiff
- Delphi Falls
- Jack's Reef
- Jamesville
- Kirkville
- Marietta
- Mattydale
- Memphis
- Messina Springs
- Mottville
- Mycenae
- Navarino
- Onondaga Hill
- Oran
- Otisco
- Otisco Valley
- Plainville
- Pompey Center
- Rose Hill
- Shepard Settlement
- Skaneateles Falls
- South Spafford
- Spafford Valley
- Split Rock
- Taunton
- Warners

==== Native American reservations ====
- Onondaga Reservation

== See also ==
- List of bus routes in Onondaga County, New York
- List of counties in New York
- National Register of Historic Places listings in Onondaga County, New York
- Onondaga Creek
- Timeline of town creation in Onondaga County
