= Edward Jesup Alvord =

American lawyer and politician (1831–1868)

- Born: March 26, 1831; Southport, Connecticut, U.S.
- Died: October 16, 1868 (aged 37); Southport, Connecticut, U.S.
- Education: Yale College
- Occupations: Lawyer, politician

Edward Jesup Alvord (March 26, 1831 – October 16, 1868) was an American lawyer and politician.

== Early years and education ==
He was the only son of Jesup and Susan Alvord, and was born at Southport, March 26, 1831. He graduated from Yale College in 1852. After graduation, he studied law, under Judge Thomas B. Osborne in Fairfield, and also engaged in teaching in the same town, and was admitted to the bar of Fairfield County on October 16, 1858.

== Career ==
He then became a lawyer in the village of Southport, where he remained until his death. In 1862, he represented the town in the Connecticut State Legislature.

== Personal life and death ==
He married, on June 15, 1859, Sarah Elizabeth, daughter of the late Walter Bulkley, of Southport. Two of their children died in infancy, and the only remaining child, a boy of five years, died of dysentery in September, 1868. She died June 20, 1866. The father, brought down by exhaustion and sorrow at this last bereavement, fell an easy victim of the same disease some three weeks later. He died at Southport on October 16, 1868, aged 37.

This article incorporates public domain material from the Yale Obituary Record.
