= Lori Alvord =

Native American surgeon and author

Lori Arviso Alvord
- Born: 1958 (age 67–68); Crownpoint, New Mexico, US
- Citizenship: Navajo Nation, American
- Education: Dartmouth College (A.B.); Stanford University School of Medicine (M.D.)
- Occupations: Surgeon author
- Years active: 1994–present
- Known for: First Diné woman to be board certified in surgery 2013 nominee for U.S. Surgeon General
- Spouse: Jonathan Alvord
- Children: Christopher Kodiak Alvord; Kaitlyn Arviso Alvord
- Parent(s): Rita Colgan (mother); Robert Cupp (father)
- Relatives: Karen Dunn (sister); Robyn Corbett (sister)

Lori Arviso Alvord (born 1958) is a Native American surgeon and author. She is perhaps best known for being the first Diné woman to ever become board certified in surgery. Her autobiography, The Scalpel and the Silver Bear, has brought increased attention to her career as a surgeon and has sold over 50,000 copies. Alvord was also nominated to serve as the U.S. Surgeon General in 2013. Alvord uses new techniques that bring together Navajo healing techniques and modern Western Medicine.

== Personal life ==
Alvord was born in a small town called Crownpoint, New Mexico, which is located on a Navajo reservation adjacent to New Mexico, to a Diné father and a White mother. English was the first language spoken in her home. She is a member of the Tsinnajinnie' (Black Streaked Wood) clan (Ponderosa Pine), and of the Ashihii' Diné (Salt People) clan.

== Career ==
Alvord graduated from Crownpoint High School in Crownpoint, New Mexico. Alvord's academic career began when she was accepted to Dartmouth College. She initially majored in Natural Sciences before transitioning into a major focusing on social sciences. She graduated from Dartmouth College in 1979 after double majoring in psychology and sociology, and minoring in Native American studies.

Following graduation from Dartmouth, Alvord undertook a career as a research assistant at the Veteran's Administration clinic in Albuquerque, New Mexico, New Mexico. The doctor who coordinated research in the lab suggested to Alvord that she should go to medical school, which caused her to blush. Alvord then enrolled in the University of New Mexico to retake pre-med courses and proceeded to apply to medical schools. She was accepted into Stanford University Medical School, where she earned her M.D. in 1985. She completed a six-year residency at Stanford University Hospital, and earned her board certification as a surgeon in 1994, which led to her becoming the first board-certified female Diné surgeon.

After studying medicine at Stanford University, Alvord returned to her Navajo reservation in New Mexico only to learn that, despite the importance of her technical proficiency in surgery, simply "fixing" the physical problem was not sufficient to fully cure a patient. Addressing the psychological and spiritual aspects of healing was important as well. This led to a more holistic approach to medicine that took into account the patient's environment and relationships. It also incorporated artwork and nature into the hospital's design. In her mind, "Beauty is so important — artwork on the walls, gardens, outdoor porches with a view. A hospital should also have the right smells, the right foods, the right sounds, the things in life that soothe us. We should also avoid the things that are wrong, that cause stress — no harsh sounds, no bright lights, no invasive overhead paging." She has written a book on her experiences, titled The Scalpel and the Silver Bear.

From 1991 to 1997, Alvord practiced as a surgeon with the Indian Health Service, at one of its facilities in Gallup. Alvord was also the associate dean for student affairs at Dartmouth Medical School as well as assistant professor of surgery and psychiatry at Dartmouth from 1997 to 2009. From 2003 onwards, Alvord served as an Associate Faculty member for the Center for American Indian Health at Johns Hopkins School of Public Health. From 2008 to 2010, Alvord served on the National Advisory Council for Complementary and Alternative Medicine (NACCAM), the principal advisory body to the National Center for Complementary and Alternative Medicine (NCCAM), a component of the National Institutes of Health. From 2010 to 2012, Alvord served as the Associate Dean of the Central Michigan University College of Medicine, which opened during the Fall 2013 semester. She played an instrumental role in developing the new medical school. She was also the associate dean of student affairs and admissions at the University of Arizona College of Medicine, in Tucson, Arizona from 2012 to 2014.

== Awards and recognition ==
In 2001, Alvord received an honorary degree from Albany Medical College. In 2006, Alvord received an honorary degree from Drexel University. In 2009, Alvord was bequeathed an honorary degree from Pine Manor College.

In 1992, Alvord was the recipient of Governor's Award for Outstanding New Mexico Women, from former governor of New Mexico, Bruce King. In 1999, Alvord was the recipient of the American Medical Writers Association the 2000 Will Solimene Award of Excellence, for the publication "Warp and Weft", an excerpt from The Scalpel and the Silver Bear. In 2000, Alvord was the recipient of Circles Book Award from Georgia College and State University for her autobiography, The Scalpel and the Silver Bear. In 2003, Alvord was the recipient of Veterans Affairs Federal Appreciation Award, The White River Junction Veterans Affairs Medical Center.

In 2013, Alvord's philosophy has earned her recognition, as the National Indian Health Board and the National Congress of American Indians have both endorsed her to be Surgeon General of the United States.

In 2018, The Stanford Medicine Alumni Association (SMAA) announced that Lori Arviso Alvord, MD received the prestigious J. E. Wallace Sterling Lifetime Achievement Award in Medicine.
