= Westhill Central Schools =

School district in New York, United States

Westhill Central School District

Address
- 400 Walberta Road Syracuse, New York, 13219; United States

District information
- Type: Public Primary and Secondary
- Motto: "Where Educational Excellence is a Tradition"
- Established: 1960; 66 years ago
- Superintendent: Stephen Dunham
- Budget: 2.6 million
- NCES District ID: 3607320

Students and staff
- Enrollment: 1,720 (2020-2021)
- Faculty: 166
- Staff: 135
- Student–teacher ratio: 12.50
- Athletic conference: NYSPHSAA Section III varsity teams
- District mascot: Warrior
- Colors: Blue and White

Other information
- Website: www.westhillschools.org

Westhill Central Schools is a public school district immediately adjacent to the city of Syracuse, New York, USA, serving students primarily in the towns of Geddes and Onondaga.

The district is irregularly shaped with two large areas served joined by a narrow connection, as in the shape of an hourglass. The word Westhill is a conjunction of the names of the two principal areas served: Westvale, a neighborhood comprising about half of Geddes, and Onondaga Hill, a neighborhood comprising a sizable portion of Onondaga.

== Schools ==
- Westhill Senior High School (Grades 9–12)
- Onondaga Hill Middle School (Grades 5–8)
- Cherry Road School (Grades 2–4)
- Walberta Park Primary School (Grades K-1)

== Walberta Park Primary School ==
=== Staff ===
Beth Kramer became the principal of Walberta Park in the 2013–2014 school year. Prior to that, the principal was Maureen Mulderig.

== Cherry Road Elementary School ==
=== Staff ===
Jeremy Augie, former Westhill teacher, became principal of Cherry Road in the 2021–22 school year. Before that, Brett King held the position.

== Onondaga Hill Middle School ==
=== Staff ===
The principal is Kathryn Ta and the vice principal is Meagan Stanton.

== Westhill Senior High School ==
=== Staff ===
The principal is Lee Roscoe. The vice principal is Daniel Dolan.
