= Onondaga Community College =

Public community college in Syracuse, New York, United States

- Type: Public community college
- Established: 1961; 65 years ago
- Parent institution: State University of New York
- Accreditation: MSCHE
- President: Warren Hilton
- Undergraduates: 9,065 (fall 2025)
- Location: Onondaga, New York, United States; 43.006167°N 76.197306°W
- Campus: Suburban 280 acres (110 ha)
- Colors: Light blue and white
- Nickname: Lazers
- Sporting affiliations: National Junior College Athletic Association, Region III, Mid-State Athletic Conference
- Mascot: Blaze
- Website: sunyocc.edu

Onondaga Community College (OCC) is a public community college with its main campus in Onondaga, New York, United States. The college serves Onondaga County and Central New York. It is part of the State University of New York (SUNY) system.

== History ==
Onondaga Community College welcomed its first class of students in the fall of 1962 and its first graduating class in 1964. The first classes occurred in the college's downtown Syracuse location, the now-demolished Midtown Plaza. In 1970 the college moved to its new and current location in the Town of Onondaga. Residence halls were opened in 2006, and a new arena began hosting intercollegiate, scholastic, and community-based events in 2011.

== Campuses ==
The college has two campuses. The main campus is on West Seneca Turnpike in the hamlet of Onondaga Hill, west of Syracuse; OCC@Liverpool (formerly called the North Site) is on County Route 57 in Liverpool, New York.

== Organization and administration ==
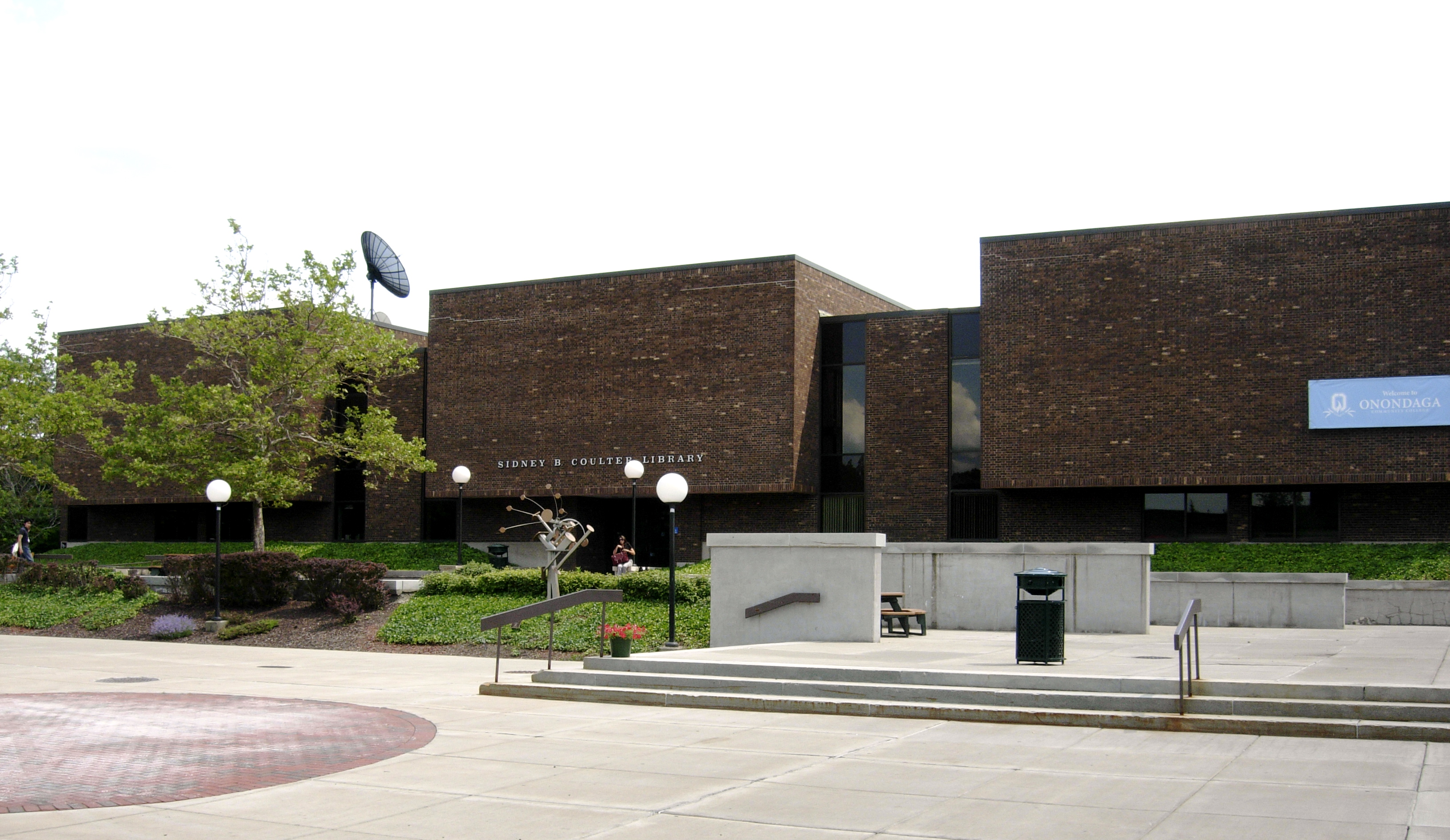
Coulter Library Building

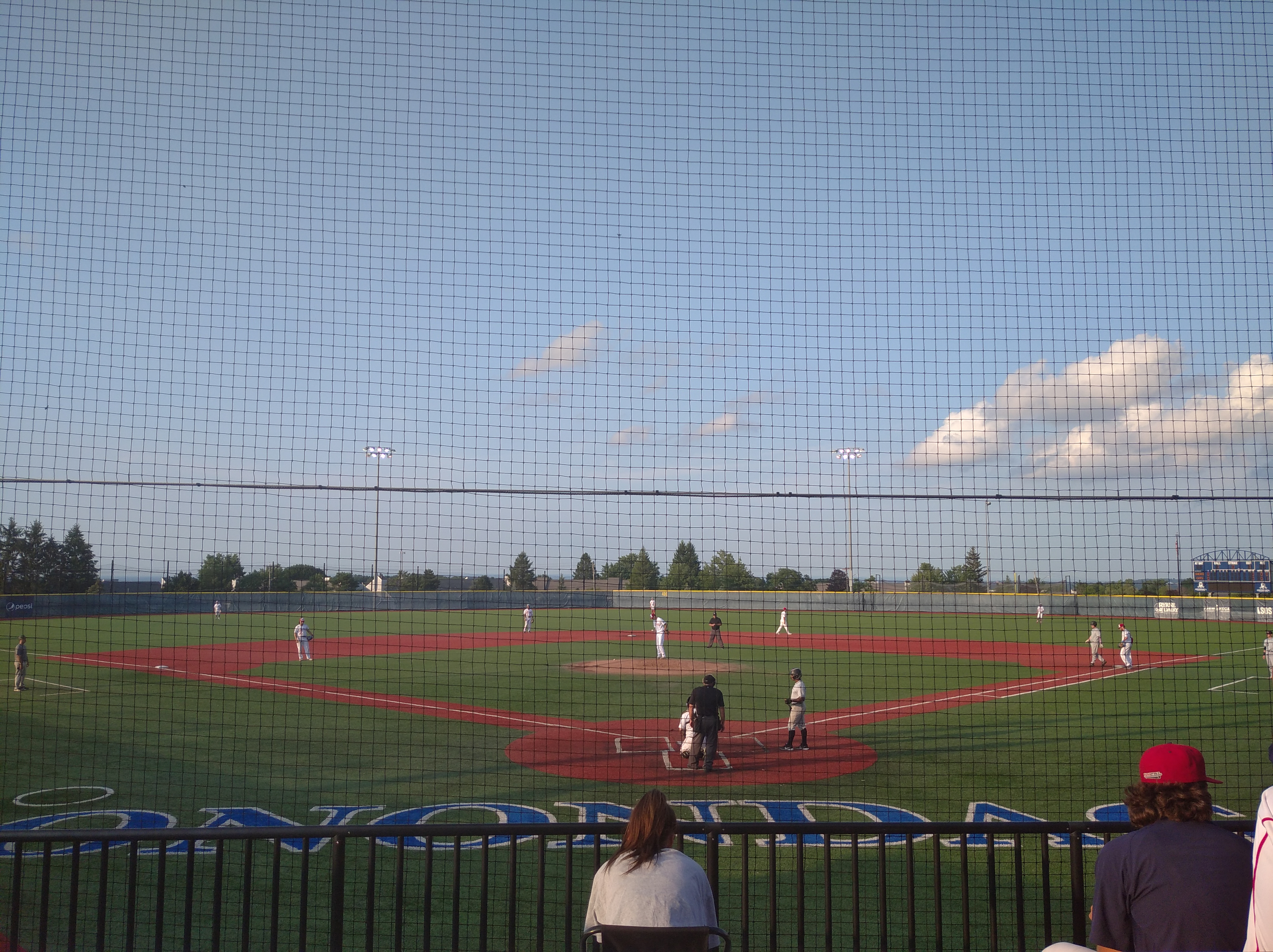
The baseball field during a Syracuse Salt Cats game, 2021

Onondaga Community College is part of the State University of New York (SUNY) system and one of 30 locally sponsored community colleges throughout New York State.

== Academics ==
OCC offers numerous areas of study for career or transfer programs. Some of these areas are: Art, Design, Media & Music; Business; Computing & Applied Technologies; Education; Health; Liberal Arts; Math, Science & Engineering; Public Safety & Community Service. The college is a training center for the National Alternative Fuels Training Consortium.

== Student life ==
In 2001, OCC started the Arts Across Campus program that showcases artists from various art fields. Each year they may have a variety of art exhibits, concerts, performances, and lectures.

== Athletics ==
OCC has 19 varsity intercollegiate athletics teams, which are nicknamed The Lazers. OCC offers 8 men's sports, which are: baseball, basketball, cross country, golf, lacrosse, soccer, track and field, and wrestling; 10 women's sports, which are: basketball, cheerleading, cross country, golf, lacrosse, soccer, softball, volleyball, and wrestling; while also offering ESports, which is Co-Ed.

OCC teams have won a combined 17 team national championships across: Men's Lacrosse (12 championships), Women's Lacrosse (2 championships), Men's Basketball (1 championship), Men's Tennis (1 championship), and ESports (1 championship). Additionally, OCC athletes have won a combined 25 individual national championships across: Men's Tennis (15 championships), Men's Track & Field (4 championships), Women's Track & Field (4 championships), Men's Cross Country (1 championship), and ESports (1 championship).

The Lazers newest athletics teams are men's and women's wrestling which will both begin during the 2024–25 school year.

The SRC Arena & Events Center is a multi-purpose facility that serves as the home of OCC's men's and women's basketball teams, and numerous NYSHPSAA section III championships for several sports. The facility possesses a six-lane track as well as three flex courts to host basketball, tennis, volleyball, and other sports. The facility is also used for community and scholastic events, and concerts. It is 60,000 square feet (5,600 square meters) and seats up to 6,500 people.

== Notable alumni ==
- Laurie Halse Anderson, author
- Grace Jones, singer, model and actress
- Mike Randall, actor and meteorologist
- Randy Staats, professional lacrosse player
