= Split Rock, New York =

Split Rock
- hamlet
- Location within the state of New York
- Coordinates: 43°1′33″N 76°13′52″W
- Country: United States
- State: New York
- County: Onondaga
- Time zone: UTC-5 (Eastern (EST))
  - Summer (DST): UTC-4 (EDT)

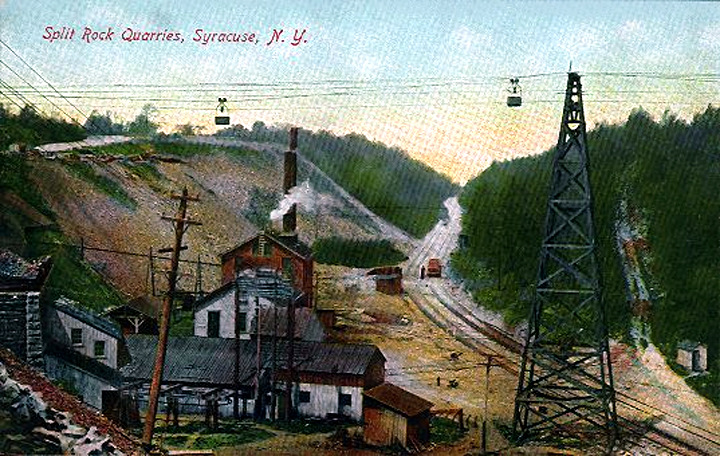
Postcard depicting Split Rock quarry operations around 1910

Split Rock (also Splitrock) is a hamlet in the Town of Onondaga in Onondaga County, New York, United States. Today more a historic place than a community, Split Rock is a site of interest to industrial archeology. A limestone quarry was established in Split Rock by Gilbert Coons around 1834. In 1880, the Solvay Process Company expanded quarry operations, delivering limestone used for the Solvay process by an elevated conveyor about two miles (3.2 km) long to the industrial plant at Solvay, New York. This quarry was abandoned about 1912.

In 1915, during World War I, Split Rock became the site of a munitions factory operated by the Semet-Solvay Company. The plant employed about 2500 people when it exploded on July 2, 1918, killing at least 50. The explosion allegedly occurred after a mixing motor in the main TNT building overheated. The fire rapidly spread through the wooden structure of the main factory. Firefighting efforts were hampered by a loss of water pressure, and the factory eventually exploded. Approximately 1-3 tons of TNT were involved in the blast, which leveled the structure and led to the death of 50 men (conflicting reports mention 52 deaths). Large quantities of TNT and picric acid awaiting shipment were stored in magazines and warehouses across a valley from the main factory. However, the fire did not spread to these. The production of picric acid, nitric acid, and other products continued throughout the remainder of the war.

Following the war the site ceased production of war materials, but was used for a time as a State Department of Transportation maintenance and parking facility supporting DOT operations in the Central New York area. That role ceased in the mid-1980s. Today the area has largely reverted to natural growth, but retains ruins, including man-made tunnels as well as natural limestone caves. Split Rock High School was built in 1918 and served the community until 1950, when it merged with the Camillus, Fairmount, and Warners school districts to form the West Genesee Central School District. Split Rock then became an elementary school within that district.

Split Rock is also known as the locale for the discovery of the American hart's tongue fern by Frederick Pursh in 1807. This fern is endangered in the United States. Its habitat in Split Rock as well as the remains of the limestone quarry and the munitions factory are preserved as a 32-acre (13-hectare) New York State Unique Area. Another 100 acres (40 ha) are owned by New York State and by Onondaga County.

== See also ==
- List of the largest artificial non-nuclear explosions
