= Onondaga, New York =

Town in New York, United States

- Town
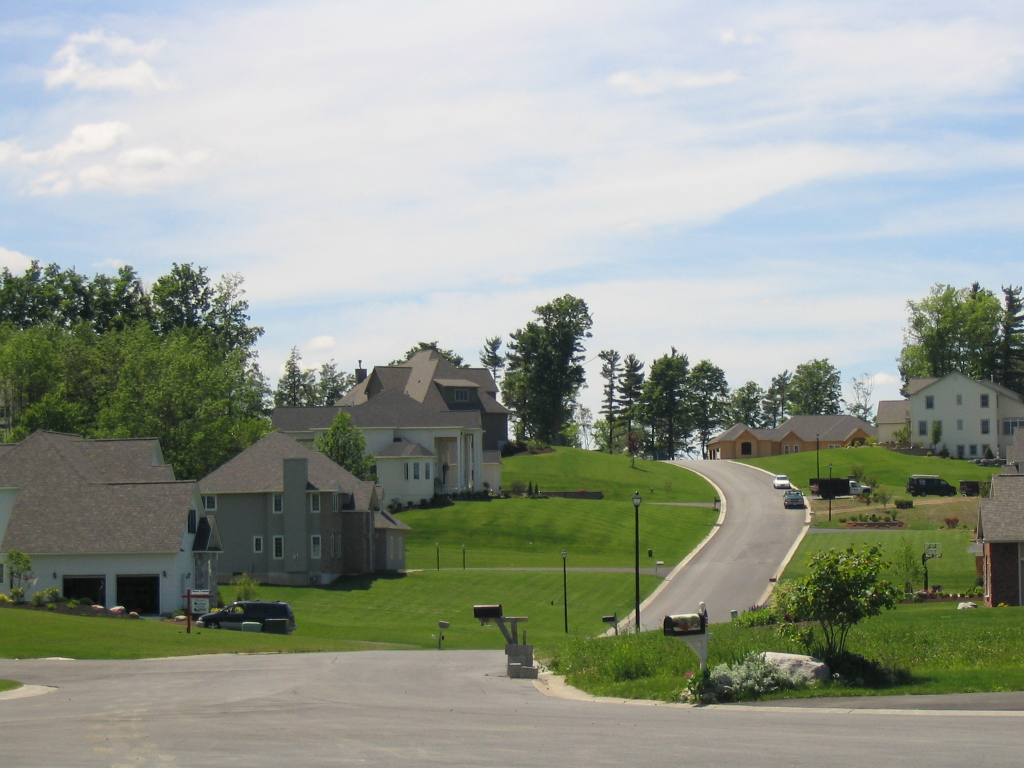
- A neighborhood in the town of Onondaga in 2004

- Logo

- Location in Onondaga County and the state of New York.
- Coordinates: 42°58′41″N 76°11′54″W
- Country: United States
- State: New York
- County: Onondaga

Government
  - Type: Town Board
  - Town Supervisor: John P. Mahar

Area
  - Total: 57.84 sq mi (149.80 km^{2})
  - Land: 57.74 sq mi (149.55 km^{2})
  - Water: 0.097 sq mi (0.25 km^{2})
- Elevation: 1,033 ft (315 m)

Population (2020)
  - Total: 22,937
  - Density: 397.24/sq mi (153.37/km^{2})
- Time zone: UTC-5 (Eastern (EST))
  - Summer (DST): UTC-4 (EDT)
- ZIP code: 13215
- Area code: 315
- FIPS code: 36-54958
- GNIS feature ID: 0979311
- Website: townofonondaga.gov

The Town of Onondaga (/ˌɑːnənˈdɑːɡə/ AHN-ən-DAH-gə) is a municipality in Onondaga County, New York, United States, encompassing 65 square miles. As of the 2020 Census, the population was 22,937. The town is named after the native Onondaga tribe, part of the Haudenosaunee Confederacy. Onondaga was incorporated April 2, 1798, and is located southwest of the city of Syracuse, which it borders. The villages and hamlets which make up the town are: Cedarvale, Howlett Hill, Navarino, Nedrow, Onondaga Hill, Sentinel Heights, South Onondaga, Southwood, Split Rock, and Taunton.

== History ==
Native Americans have inhabited the region for centuries. As early as 1600, Onondaga was a village that served as the capital of the Haudenosaunee League and the primary settlement of the Onondaga people. During the American Revolution, the Onondagas sided with the British, and Onondaga was attacked by the Continental Army on April 21, 1779. After the war, the Onondagas were forced to cede their lands in New York to the new state, although some land was set aside to form the Onondaga Reservation. Most of the Onondagas left New York and were resettled in Upper Canada.

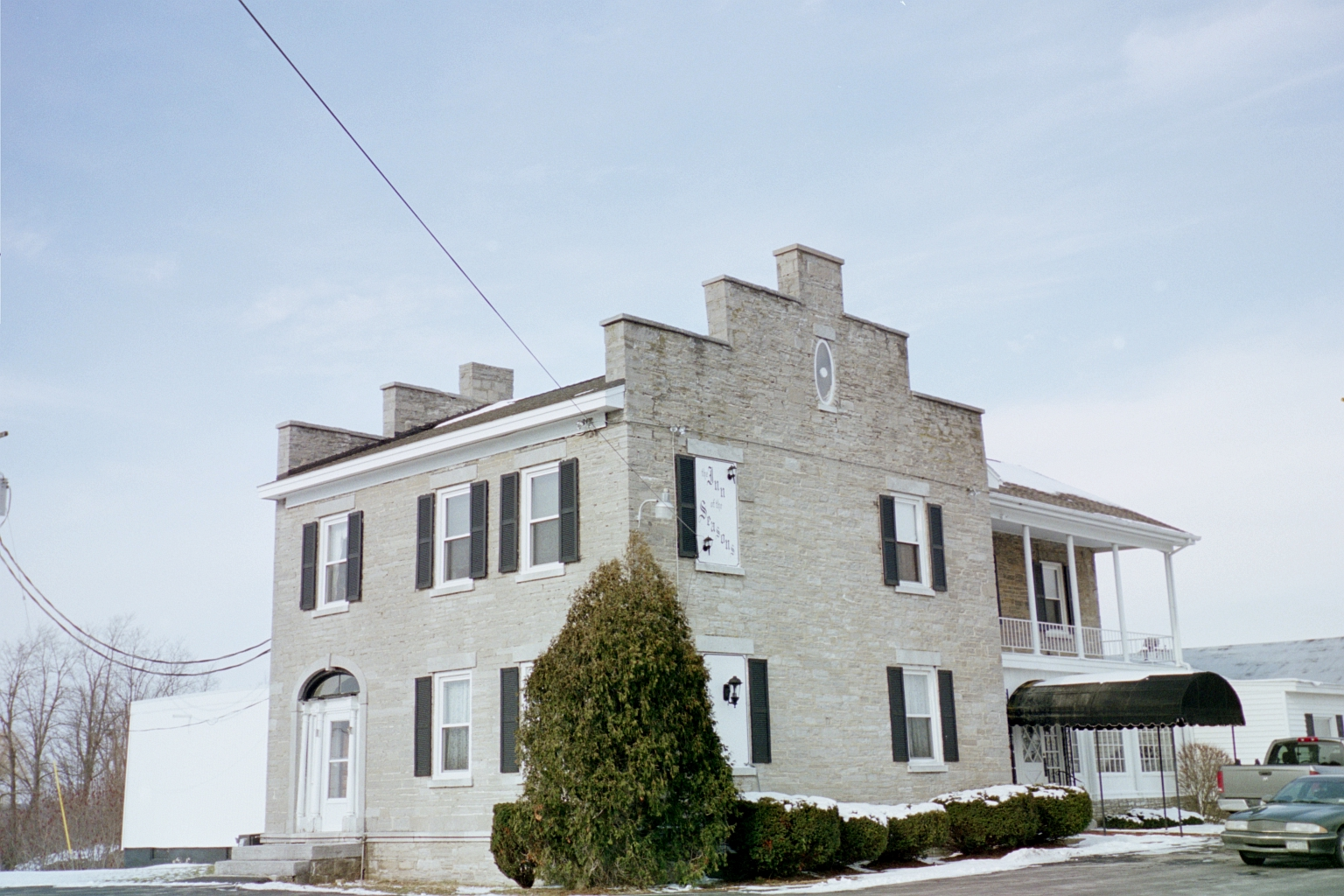
The Gen. Orrin Hutchinson House

The Onondaga region was within what was designated the Central New York Military Tract, in which the new government allotted land grants to veterans as payment for their war service. In the postwar years, the area was flooded with migrants from New England and eastern New York. The Town of Onondaga was incorporated on April 2, 1798, from parts of other towns, with several subsequent boundary changes. When Onondaga County was formed in 1794, the town was established originally from parts of the Towns of Marcellus, Pompey, and Manlius.

The first court house for the County of Onondaga was built in 1805 on the public square in Onondaga Hill, which was then the county seat. The building was laid out by surveyor and engineer James Geddes (see Town of Geddes). After the county seat was moved to Syracuse in 1830, the building in Onondaga Hill was used as a school until 1846.

The Gen. Orrin Hutchinson House - which is now the Inn of the Seasons restaurant - at 4311 W. Seneca Turnpike is the only Town of Onondaga site listed in the National Register of Historic Places.

== Geography ==
The Town of Onondaga, located in the county of Onondaga and the state of New York, was incorporated April 2, 1798, and has undergone several boundary changes since that time. The present size is 65 square miles with a population of approximately 23,000.

The villages and hamlets which make up the town are: Cedarvale, Howlett Hill, Navarino, Nedrow, Onondaga Hill, Sentinel Heights, South Onondaga, Southwood, Split Rock, and Taunton.

The official New York State Gazetteer, maintained and published by the New York State Department of Health, also includes a now-defunct (or perhaps renamed) hamlet known only as "Indian Village"; the Gazetteer includes numerous defunct hamlets and towns, some with alternate or archaic spellings.

According to the United States Census Bureau, the town has a total area of 57.8 square miles (150 km^{2}), of which 57.7 square miles (149 km^{2}) is land and 0.1 square miles (0.26 km^{2}) (0.16%) is water.

Interstate 81 passes along the eastern side of the town. U.S. Route 11 is a north–south highway in the eastern part of Onondaga, paralleling the interstate. U.S. Route 20 is an east–west highway in the south of the town. New York State Route 173 is an east–west highway through the middle of Onondaga. New York State Route 11A diverges westward from US-11. New York State Route 80 cuts through the southern part of the town.

== Demographics ==
Historical population
Census	Pop.	Note	%±
1820	5,552		—
1830	5,668		2.1%
1840	5,658		−0.2%
1850	5,694		0.6%
1860	5,113		−10.2%
1870	5,530		8.2%
1880	6,358		15.0%
1890	5,135		−19.2%
1900	5,264		2.5%
1910	5,963		13.3%
1920	6,620		11.0%
1930	5,826		−12.0%
1940	6,905		18.5%
1950	9,351		35.4%
1960	13,429		43.6%
1970	16,555		23.3%
1980	17,824		7.7%
1990	18,396		3.2%
2000	21,063		14.5%
2010	23,101		9.7%
2020	22,937		−0.7%
U.S. Decennial Census

As of the census of 2020, there were approximately 23,000 people, 7,679 households, and 5,513 families residing in the town. The population density was 364.9 inhabitants per square mile (140.9/km^{2}). There were 7,964 housing units at an average density of 138.0 per square mile (53.3/km^{2}). The racial makeup of the town was 94.29% White, 1.96% African American, 1.07% Native American, 1.16% Asian, 0.04% Pacific Islander, 0.16% from other races, and 1.32% from two or more races. Hispanic or Latino of any race were 1.05% of the population.

There were 7,679 households, out of which 35.1% had children under the age of 18 living with them, 60.4% were married couples living together, 8.1% had a female householder with no husband present, and 28.2% were non-families. 23.5% of all households were made up of individuals, and 11.2% had someone living alone who was 65 years of age or older. The average household size was 2.64 and the average family size was 3.15.

In the town, the population was spread out, with 26.5% under the age of 18, 5.4% from 18 to 24, 27.2% from 25 to 44, 23.7% from 45 to 64, and 17.2% who were 65 years of age or older. The median age was 40 years. For every 100 females, there were 92.0 males. For every 100 females age 18 and over, there were 86.7 males.

The median income for a household in the town was $53,421, and the median income for a family was $63,674. Males had a median income of $42,495 versus $31,160 for females. The per capita income for the town was $25,522. About 2.6% of families and 4.2% of the population were below the poverty line, including 3.8% of those under age 18 and 6.7% of those age 65 or over.

== See also ==
- Onondaga Community College
- West Genesee Central School District
- Westhill Central Schools
