= West Genesee Central School District =

Public school district located in Syracuse, New York, United States

Location
- Camillus, NY Central New York United States

District information
- Type: Public
- Motto: We Celebrate Learning!
- Grades: Pre-K through 12
- Established: 1952
- Superintendent: David C. Bills
- Budget: $105,709,050 (2023-24)

Students and staff
- Students: 4,431
- Teachers: 438
- Athletic conference: NYSPHAA
- Colors: Blue and Gold

Other information
- NYSPHAA Section: 3
- Website: www.westgenesee.org

Map showing the location of Syracuse, NY with New York

The West Genesee Central School District (WGCSD) is a public school district located in suburban Syracuse, NY. The district covers 41 square miles (110 km^{2}) and is centered in the town of Camillus, but also serves parts of Elbridge, Geddes, Onondaga, and Van Buren. Student enrollment as of the 2023–2024 academic year is 4,740. The district has 930 employees.

== Administration ==
The district offices are located adjacent to Stonehedge Elementary at 300 Sanderson Drive in Camillus. The Superintendent of schools is David C. Bills. Mike Burns is the athletic director and William Davern is the Director of Fine Arts.

=== Board of education ===
The Board of Education has nine members elected to three year terms who serve without pay.

Current members:

- Kimberly B. Coyne, President
- Jennifer James, Vice President
- Eric Bacon
- Elizabeth Donaldson
- Vladimiro Hart-Zavoli
- Kathryne Moulton
- Jeffrey Reina
- Aaron Ryder
- Barbara A. Wells

== List of Schools ==
- High School (Grades 9–12):
  - West Genesee High School
- Junior High School (Grades 7–8)
  - Camillus Middle School
- Middle School (Grades 5–6):
  - West Genesee Intermediate School
- Elementary Schools (Grades K-4):
  - East Hill Elementary School
  - Onondaga Road Elementary School
  - Split Rock Elementary School
  - Stonehedge Elementary School

== Bird's Eye Images ==
- East Hill Elementary
- Onondaga Road Elementary
- Split Rock Elementary
- Stonehedge Elementary
- Camillus Middle
- West Genesee Intermediate
- West Genesee High
