= Port Gibson, New York =

- Census-designated place
- Location within New York Location within the United States
- Coordinates: 43°2′12″N 77°9′16″W
- Country: United States
- State: New York
- County: Ontario
- Town: Manchester

Area
  - Total: 1.27 sq mi (3.29 km^{2})
  - Land: 1.24 sq mi (3.21 km^{2})
  - Water: 0.031 sq mi (0.08 km^{2})
- Elevation: 470 ft (140 m)

Population (2020)
  - Total: 405
  - Density: 327.0/sq mi (126.26/km^{2})
- Time zone: UTC-5 (Eastern (EST))
  - Summer (DST): UTC-4 (EDT)
- ZIP Codes: 14537 (Port Gibson); 14432 (Clifton Springs)
- Area codes: 315/680
- FIPS code: 36-59322
- GNIS feature ID: 2628179

Port Gibson is a hamlet and census-designated place (CDP) in the town of Manchester, Ontario County, New York, United States. As of the 2020 census, Port Gibson had a population of 405.

== Geography ==
The CDP is in northern Ontario County, in the northeast corner of the town of Manchester. It is bordered to the north by the Erie Canal. New York State Route 31, following the canal, runs through the northern edge of the community, leading east 3.5 miles (5.6 km) to Newark and northwest 5 miles (8 km) to Palmyra. The village of Manchester is 7 miles (11 km) to the southwest.

The Port Gibson United Methodist Church was listed on the National Register of Historic Places in 1996. A U. S. Post Office is located in Port Gibson with a ZIP code of 14537, but a small portion of Port Gibson uses the Clifton Springs postal code of 14432.

Port Gibson is Ontario County's lone land access to the NYS Barge Canal (formerly Erie Canal).

== Demographics ==
Historical population
Census	Pop.	Note	%±
2020	405		—
U.S. Decennial Census
