= Shortsville, New York =

- Village
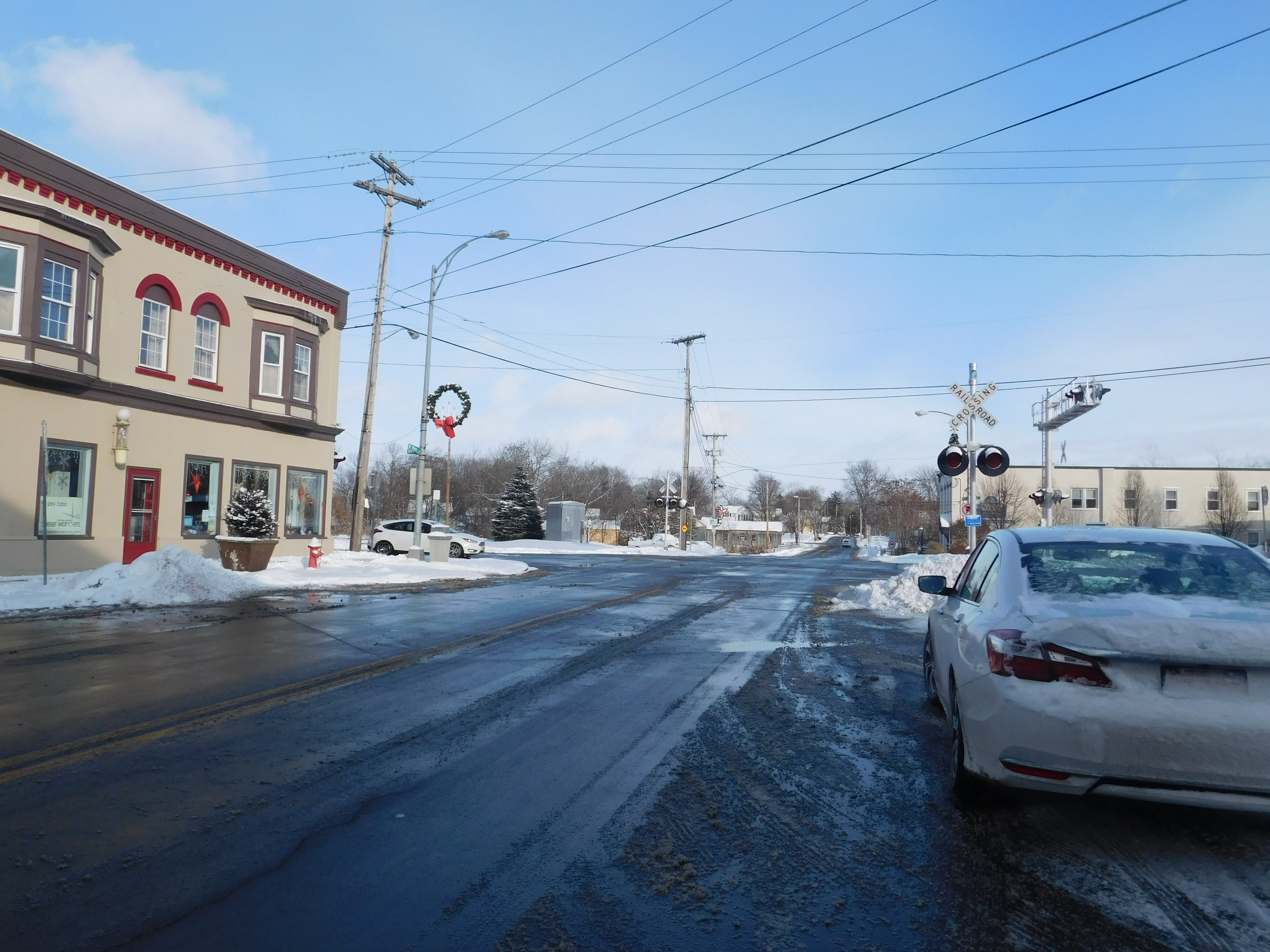
- Shortsville as seen from the former New York Central Railroad depot property

- Location within the state of New York
- Coordinates: 42°57′18″N 77°13′22″W
- Country: United States
- State: New York
- County: Ontario

Area
  - Total: 0.63 sq mi (1.63 km^{2})
  - Land: 0.63 sq mi (1.63 km^{2})
  - Water: 0 sq mi (0.00 km^{2})
- Elevation: 620 ft (189 m)

Population (2020)
  - Total: 1,400
  - Density: 2,220.4/sq mi (857.31/km^{2})
- Time zone: UTC-5 (Eastern (EST))
  - Summer (DST): UTC-4 (EDT)
- ZIP code: 14548
- Area code: 585
- FIPS code: 36-67257
- GNIS feature ID: 0965178
- Website: Village website

Shortsville, officially the Village of Shortsville, is a village in Ontario County, New York, United States. The population was 1,400 at the time of the 2020 U.S. census. Shortsville encompasses the southwestern part of the Town of Manchester and is located north of the City of Canandaigua.

== History ==
Originally called "Short Mill," Shortsville began its existence in 1804 when Theophilus Short built two mills along the shores of the Canandaigua Outlet; the village was then incorporated in 1889.

Shortsville grew as a mill town and a number of flour, wool and paper mills were built in addition to Short's original flour and saw mills.

Companies that once inhabited Shortsville include Empire Drill Works, founded by Hiram and Calvin Brown in 1850 and operated until 1900, Shortsville Wheel Company, a manufacturer of carriage and automobile wheels, founded in 1889 and closed in the early 20th century, and Papec Machine Company, a manufacturer of farming implements, which ceased operation in the 1980s.

The first school in the village was built in 1807, a district school was built in 1911, and the Shortsville High School was completed by 1915. The property where this latter building was located is now occupied by a building and field associated with St. Dominic Church, a parish of the Roman Catholic Diocese of Rochester.

== Geography ==
According to the United States Census Bureau, the village has a total area of 0.6 square miles (1.6 km^{2}), all land.

County Road 13, which is Main Street in Shortsville, intersects New York State Route 21 in the western side of the village. Shortsville is approximately two miles south of both the New York State Thruway and New York State Route 96.

Shortsville is immediately south of the Village of Manchester.

== Demographics ==
Historical population
Census	Pop.	Note	%±
1880	620		—
1900	922		—
1910	1,112		20.6%
1920	1,300		16.9%
1930	1,332		2.5%
1940	1,316		−1.2%
1950	1,314		−0.2%
1960	1,382		5.2%
1970	1,516		9.7%
1980	1,669		10.1%
1990	1,485		−11.0%
2000	1,320		−11.1%
2010	1,439		9.0%
2020	1,400		−2.7%
U.S. Decennial Census

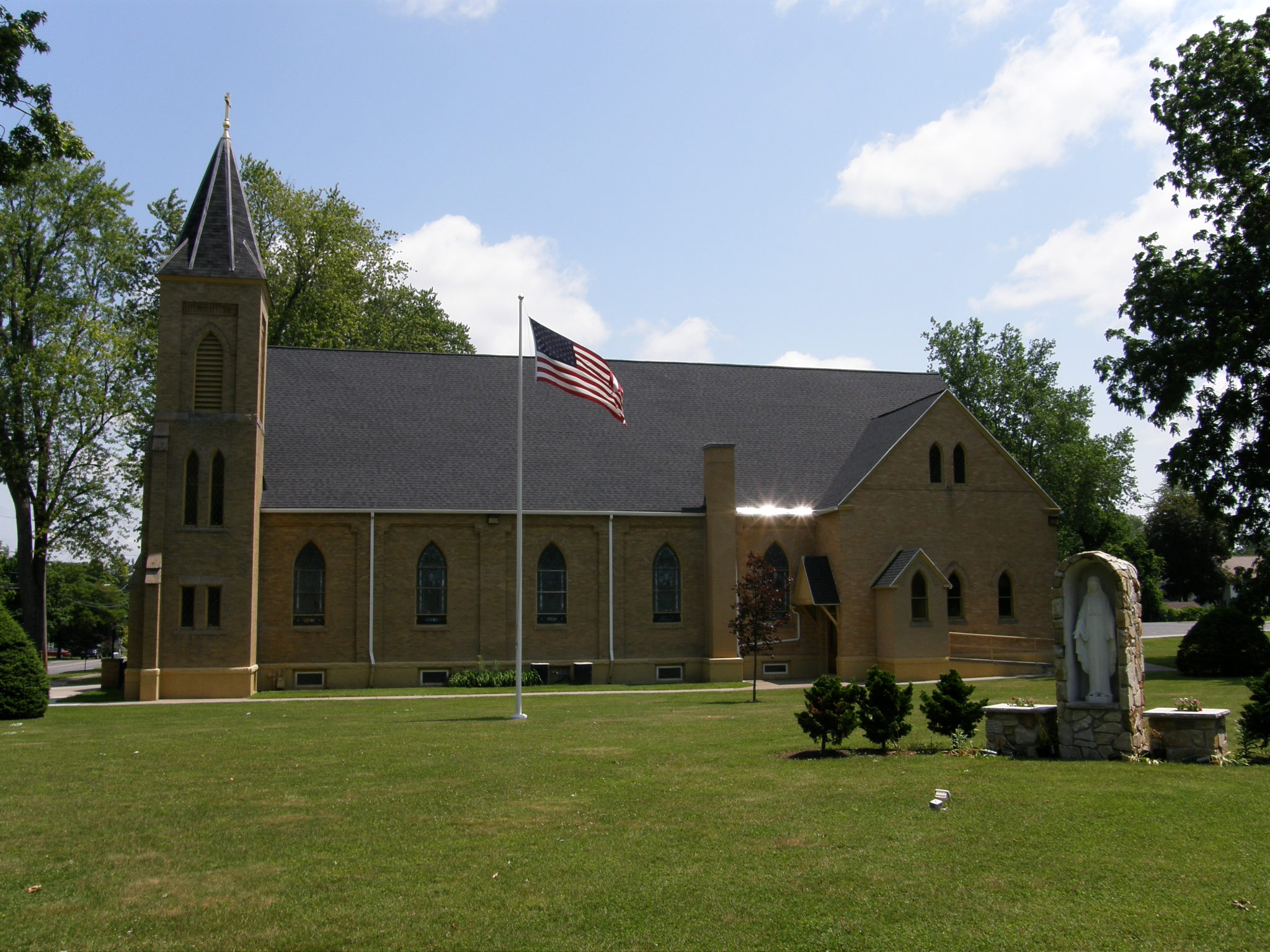
St. Dominic's Catholic Church

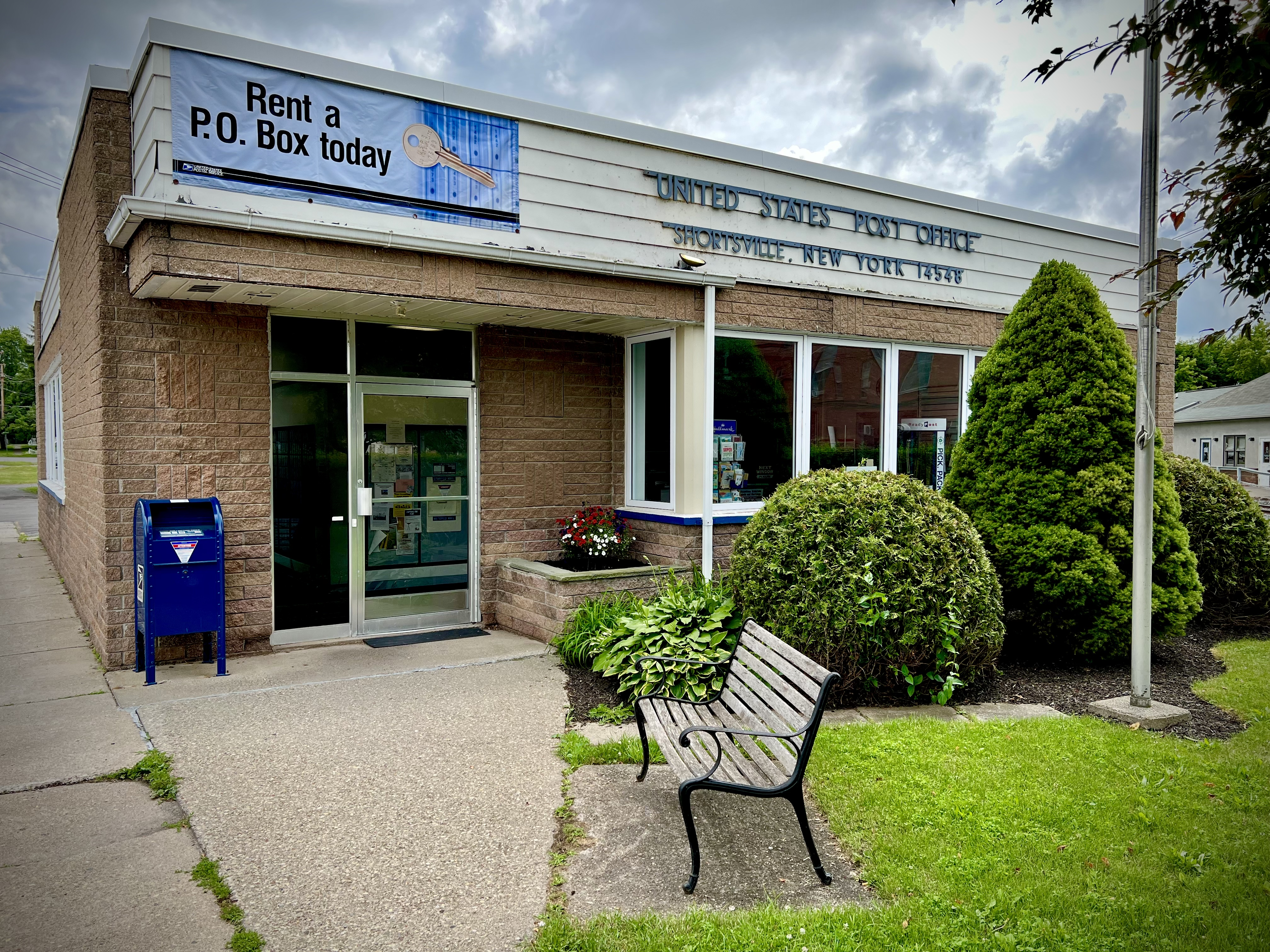
Shortsville Post Office

As of the census of 2000, there were 1,320 people, 508 households, and 368 families residing in the village. The population density was 2,078.5 inhabitants per square mile (802.5/km^{2}). There were 520 housing units at an average density of 818.8 per square mile (316.1/km^{2}). The racial makeup of the village was 98.18% White, 0.08% African American, 0.30% Native American, 0.30% Asian, 0.08% from other races, and 1.06% from two or more races. Hispanic or Latino of any race were 0.91% of the population.

There were 508 households, out of which 35.6% had children under the age of 18 living with them, 57.3% were married couples living together, and 27.4% were non-families. 21.3% of all households were made up of individuals, and 8.7% had someone living alone who was 65 years of age or older. The average household size was 2.58 and the average family size was 3.02.

In the village, the population was spread out, with 25.6% under the age of 18, 6.5% from 18 to 24, 32.3% from 25 to 44, 24.7% from 45 to 64, and 10.9% who were 65 years of age or older. The median age was 37 years. For every 100 females, there were 93.0 males. For every 100 females age 18 and over, there were 96.8 males.

The median income for a household in the village was $44,432, and the median income for a family was $51,023. Males had a median income of $32,650 versus $24,886 for females. The per capita income for the village was $20,440. About 2.4% of families and 4.3% of the population were below the poverty line, including 3.4% of those under age 18 and 8.8% of those age 65 or over.

== Media ==
The film We Are Still Here was filmed in Shortsville in 2014.

== Notable people ==
- Philip Bredesen, Governor of Tennessee, grew up in Shortsville.
- John Mitzewich, American chef and cooking vlogger.
