= Interstate 90 in New York =

Highway in New York

Interstate 90
- Map of New York with I-90 highlighted in red

Route information
- Maintained by NYSTA and NYSDOT
- Length: 385.48 mi (620.37 km)
- Existed: August 14, 1957–present
- NHS: Entire route

Major junctions
- West end: I-90 at the Pennsylvania state line in Ripley
- US 219 in West Seneca; I-190 in Buffalo; I-290 / NY 5 in Buffalo; I-390 / NY 253 in Henrietta; I-81 in DeWitt; I-88 in Rotterdam; I-87 Toll / New York Thruway in Albany; I-787 in Albany; Berkshire Connector in Schodack; Taconic State Parkway in Chatham
- East end: I-90 Toll / Mass Pike at the Massachusetts state line in West Stockbridge, MA

Location
- Country: United States
- State: New York
- Counties: Chautauqua, Erie, Genesee, Monroe, Ontario, Seneca, Cayuga, Onondaga, Madison, Oneida, Herkimer, Montgomery, Schenectady, Albany, Rensselaer, Columbia

Highway system
- Interstate Highway System; Main; Auxiliary; Suffixed; Business; Future; New York Highways; Interstate; US; State; Reference; Parkways
← NY 89A	→ NY 90

Interstate 90 (I-90) is a part of the Interstate Highway System that runs from Seattle, Washington, to Boston, Massachusetts. In the US state of New York, I-90 extends 385.48 miles (620.37 km) from the Pennsylvania state line at Ripley to the Massachusetts state line at Canaan, and is the second-longest highway in the state after New York State Route 17 (NY 17). Although most of the route is part of the tolled New York State Thruway, two non-tolled sections exist along I-90 (the first, situated outside of Buffalo, is included in the Thruway system; the second, situated in the Capital District, is not part of the Thruway system and links Albany and its eastern suburbs). Within New York, I-90 has a complete set of auxiliary Interstates, which means that there are Interstates numbered I-190 through I-990 in the state, with no gaps in between. For most of its length in New York, I-90 runs parallel to the former Erie Canal route, NY 5, US Route 20 (US 20) and the CSX Transportation railroad mainline that traverses the state.

I-90 was assigned in 1957 as part of the establishment of the Interstate Highway System. In New York, it was overlaid on the preexisting New York State Thruway from Pennsylvania to Albany, from where it would have continued to Massachusetts on a new freeway that bypassed the Berkshire Connector to the north. Ultimately, the freeway was built from the Thruway mainline in Albany to the Berkshire Connector in Schodack, and I-90 was assigned to the segment of the connector east of the proposed freeway. The Albany–Schodack freeway was completed in stages during the 1960s and 1970s and fully open by 1977.

== Route description ==
=== New York State Thruway ===
West of Albany, I-90 in New York is designated along the mainline of the New York State Thruway. The Thruway begins at the Pennsylvania state line in Chautauqua County, following the shore of Lake Erie northeast and passes through the town of Cheektowaga, a large suburb of Buffalo directly east of the city. Two auxiliary routes, I-190 (leading to Niagara Falls and connecting into Canada as Ontario Highway 405) and I-290 (a northerly bypass of Buffalo) connect with I-90 here. Both auxiliary routes provide access between I-90 and Canada's largest city, Toronto. East of Erie County, the Thruway turns east and passes through the suburbs of several major cities in Upstate New York, generally following the path of the Erie Canal. It passes south of Rochester and north of Syracuse, which are served by three auxiliary Interstate Highways: I-490 and I-390 connect to Rochester, while I-690 leads to Syracuse. The speed limit, enforced by the New York State Police, is 65 mph (105 km/h) along most of this stretch.

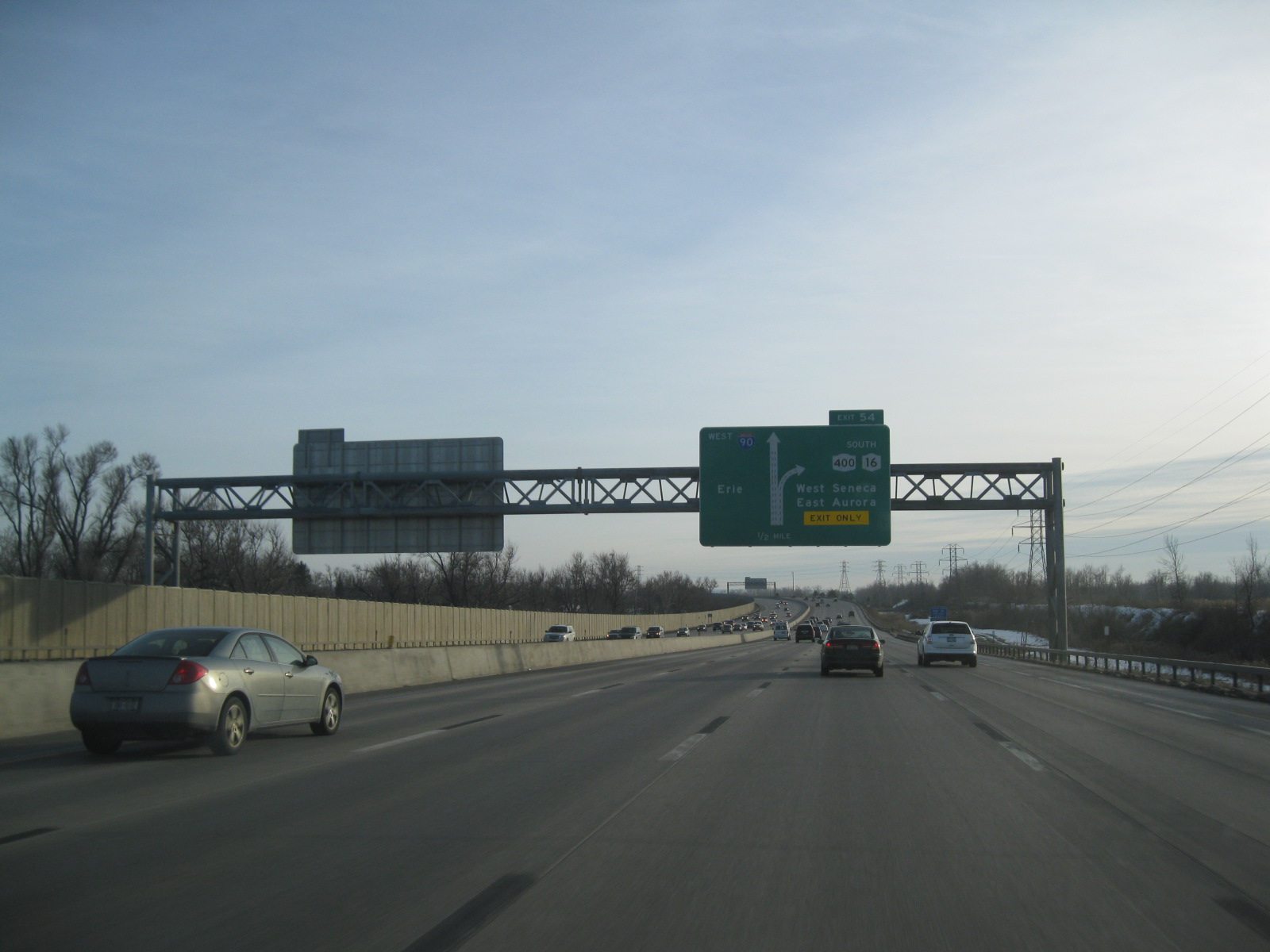
Approaching exit 54 on I-90 westbound in West Seneca

East of Syracuse, the Thruway follows the Erie Canal and, later, the Mohawk River into the Mohawk Valley toward Utica, where I-90 skirts the northern edge of downtown and meets I-790, a short route leading into the city's center. Farther east, the freeway indirectly serves the canal and riverside cities of Little Falls (via NY 169) and Amsterdam (NY 30) on its way to Schenectady, where I-890 splits from the Thruway and serves as the connection to the city center. It rejoins I-90 in Albany County, where I-90 leaves the mainline of the Thruway at exit 24 in Albany, which is signed for I-87 north and I-90 east. Here, the route designation of the Thruway changes from I-90 east to I-87 south. Traffic intending to continue on I-90 or reach I-87 north must exit the Thruway here. Exit numbers and mile markers for I-90 reset after exiting.

=== Albany and Rensselaer counties ===
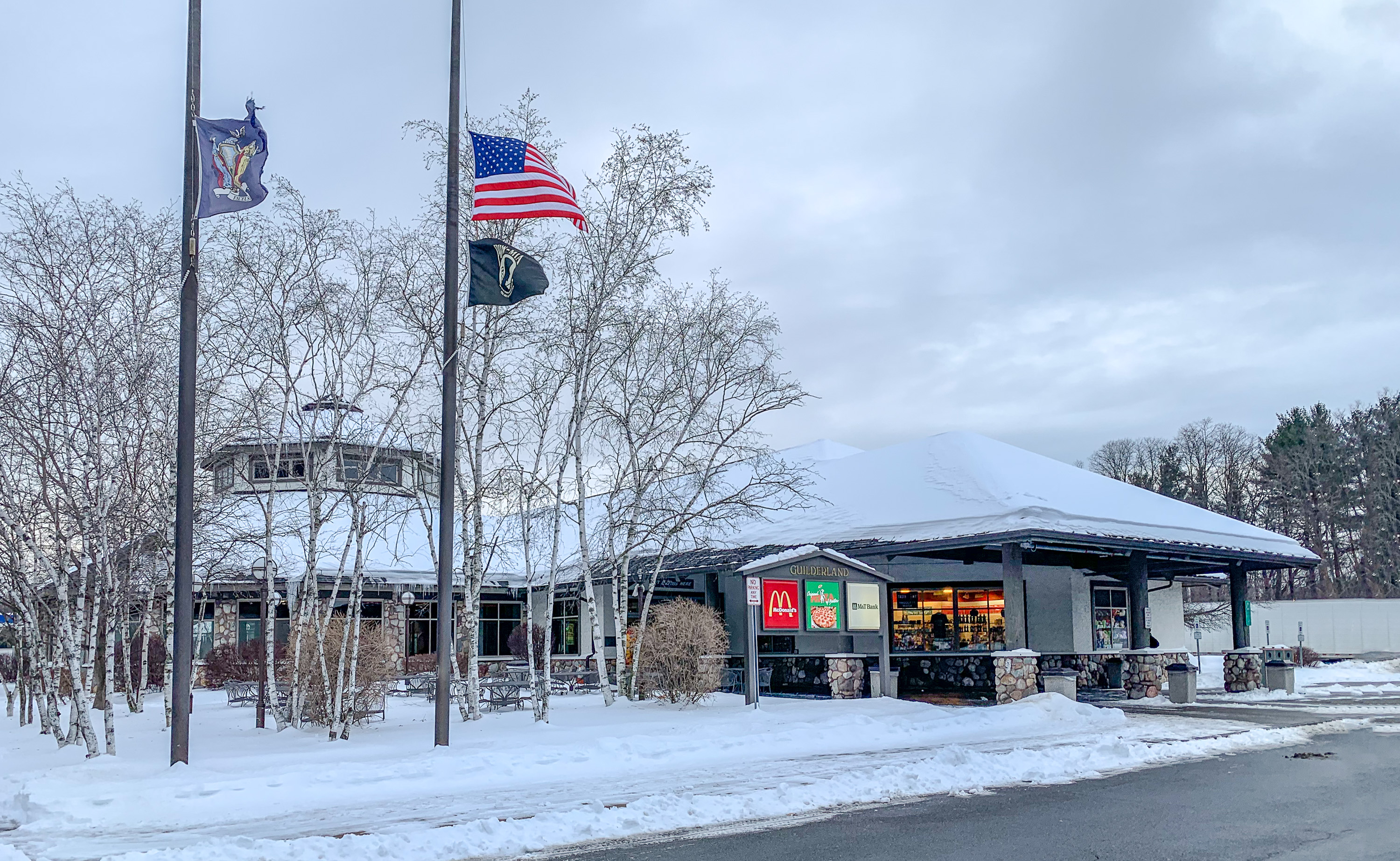
Guilderland Service Area

The Albany–Schodack section of I-90—the only portion of I-90 in New York that is not part of the Thruway system—begins concurrent with I-87 and heads southeast from Thruway exit 24. Now a toll-free highway, I-90 and I-87 continue to exits 1N and 1S, which are for I-87 and Fuller Road Alternate, respectively. Located off exit 1S and Fuller Road Alternate, an unsigned spur of the Northway leading to Western Avenue (US 20), is Crossgates Mall in Guilderland. I-90 proceeds eastward, meeting Washington Avenue at an interchange connecting to the University of Albany, SUNY, a state university, eastbound and Fuller Road (CR 156) westbound.

Exits 3 and 4, located 0.6 miles (0.97 km) apart in an area bounded by Washington and Central (NY 5) avenues, lead to the W. Averell Harriman State Office Building Campus and the New York State Police Academy (exit 3) and to the Crosstown Arterial (NY 85 at exit 4). I-90 subsequently crosses over NY 5 and passes north of Westgate Plaza as it connects to Everett Road (CR 155). The freeway continues along the northern edge of Albany to exit 5A, a large trumpet interchange originally built to serve I-687. After that project was canceled, it was repurposed as an exit for Corporate Woods Boulevard. East of exit 5A, I-90 passes by slightly more residential areas ahead of a stack interchange with US 9 one mile (1.6 km) north of downtown Albany. Albany Memorial Hospital is located just north of the exit on US 9.

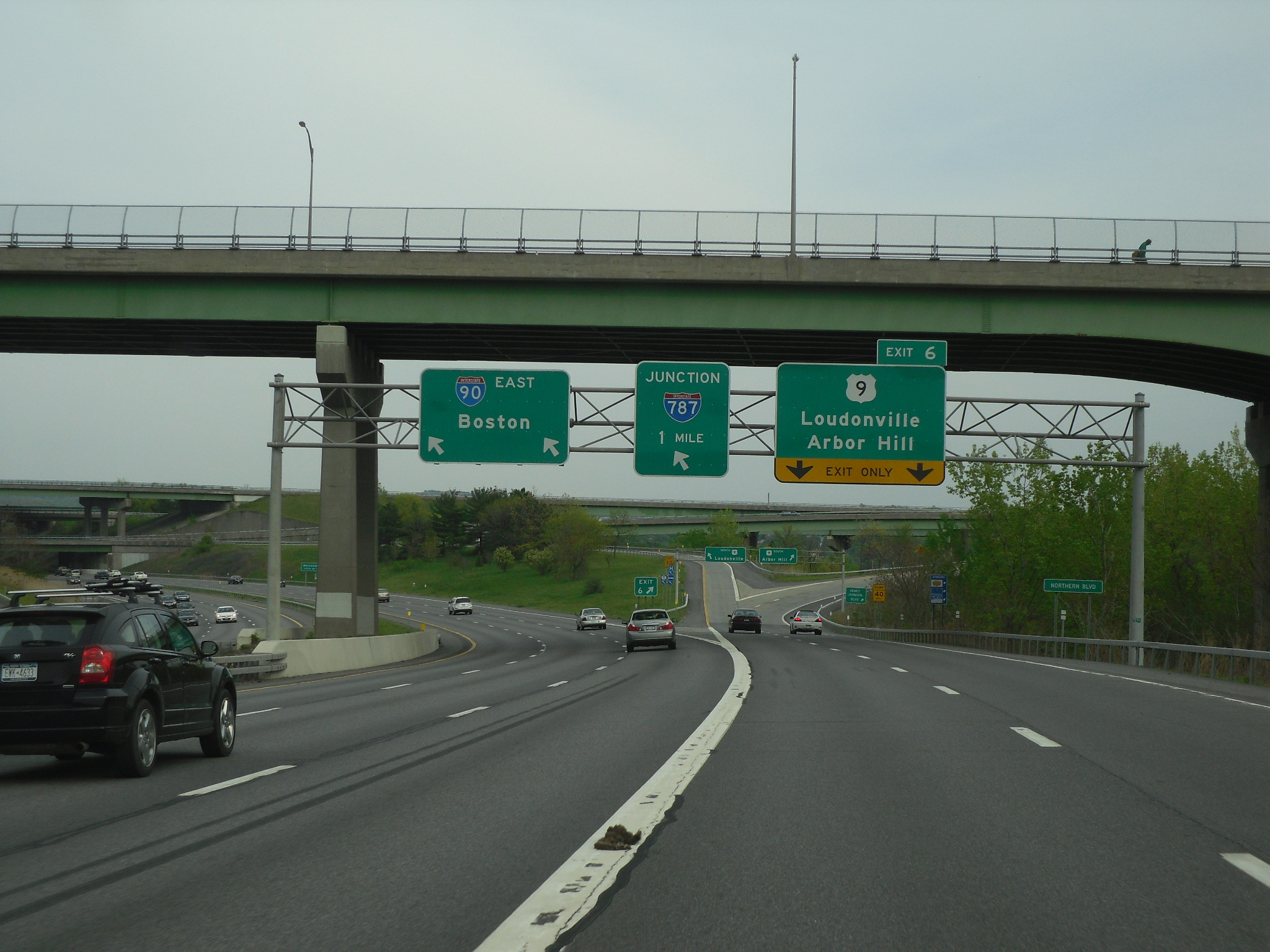
The stack interchange between I-90 and US 9 in Albany as seen from I-90 eastbound

Not far to the east of US 9 is a second stack interchange, connecting I-90 to I-787 in the industrial northeasternmost section of the city of Albany. At this point, I-90 turns to the southeast and follows the Patroon Island Bridge over the Hudson River and into Rensselaer County. Across the river, I-90 becomes the Rensselaer County Veterans Memorial Highway and passes through much less developed areas. In its first 1.5 miles (2.4 km) in the county, the freeway meets Washington Avenue at the northern edge of the city of Rensselaer and the west end of NY 43 in the town of North Greenbush, southwest of US 4 and Defreestville. South of NY 43, I-90 and US 4 follow parallel routings into East Greenbush, where I-90 directly connects to US 4 at exit 9.

I-90 heads southeastward across an undeveloped, forested section of the county, crossing over NY 151 and entering the town of Schodack, where it meets Miller Road, a connector between I-90 and the concurrent routes of US 9 and US 20. The freeway and the overlapping US Routes follow similar routings to Schodack Center, at which point I-90 finally connects to US 9 and US 20 at exits 11E and 11W. I-90 heads due south from this point, passing over NY 150 and paralleling US 9, which splits from US 20 at Schodack Center. The routes cross paths again at exit 12 just north of where I-90 rejoins the Thruway system at exit B1 of the Berkshire Connector.

=== Berkshire Connector ===
I-90 heads southeast on the connector, meeting the north end of the Taconic State Parkway in the Columbia County town of Chatham at exit B2 and NY 22 at exit B3 in the town of Canaan one mile (1.6 km) from the Massachusetts state line. The Berkshire Connector ends at the state line; however, I-90 continues southeast into Massachusetts as the Massachusetts Turnpike.

== History ==
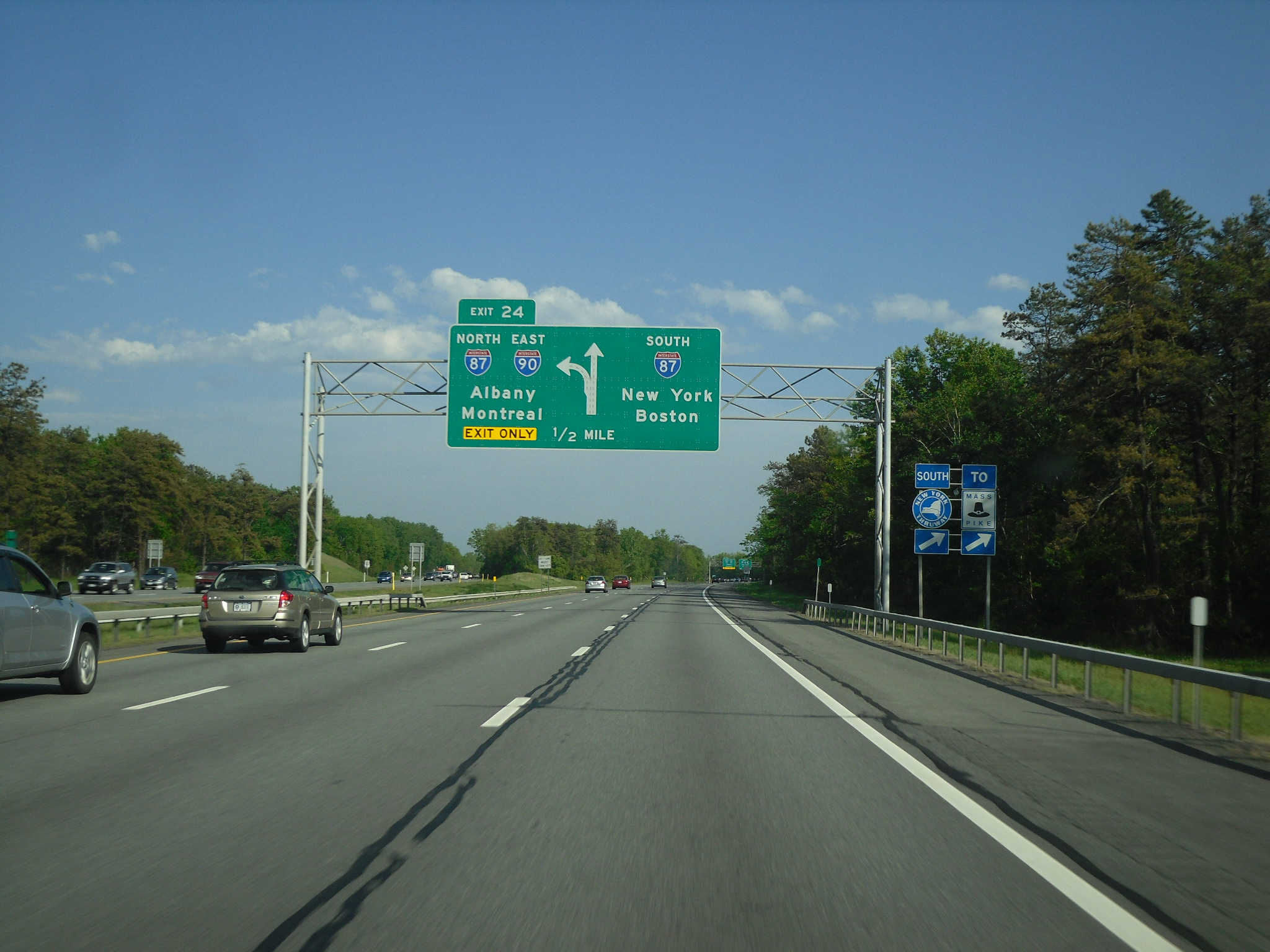
Overhead signage for exit 24 in Albany, where I-90 leaves the Thruway mainline to serve downtown Albany

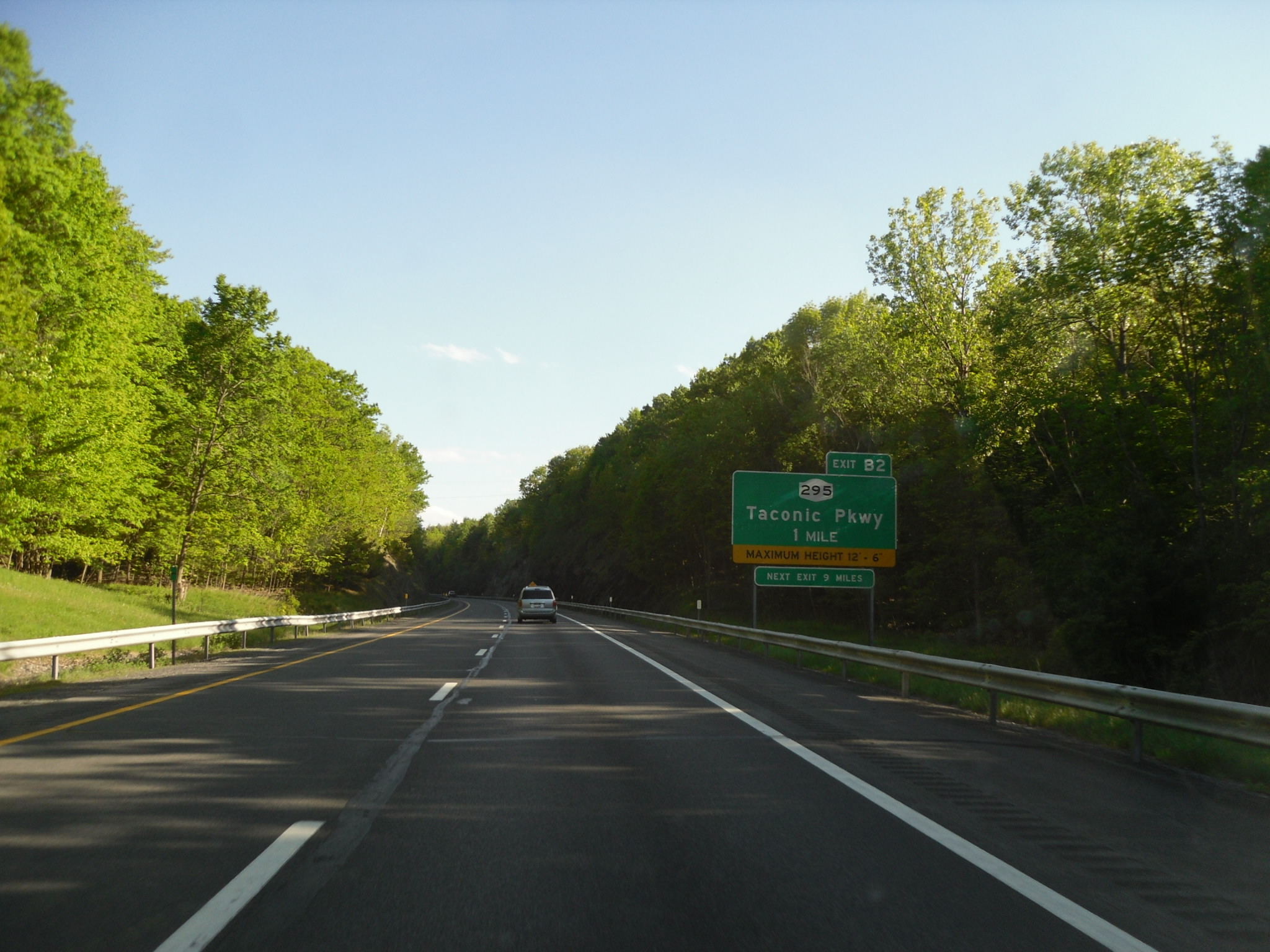
The Berkshire Connector (I-90) near exit B2 in Chatham

The east–west corridor I-90 follows across New York has always been major, followed by the Genesee Trail (1790s), Erie Canal (1825), New York Central Railroad (1853), and later the Yellowstone Trail (1912), which became US 20 and NY 5. It was planned as part of a nationwide toll road system as early as 1938. Exactly which cities would be served changed over the years, but it was the state of New York that made the decision in 1942, when they passed a law for the construction of a New York City–Albany–Buffalo–Pennsylvania "thruway". This highway, passing Utica, Syracuse, and Rochester on its path between Albany and Buffalo, would provide construction jobs in the post-World War II period. The Berkshire Thruway, a branch east from near Albany to Massachusetts, was authorized in 1944, completing the east–west route across the state. However, construction, which began in 1946, proceeded very slowly, with only one four-mile (6.4 km) portion open by 1950, when a law created the New York State Thruway Authority (NYSTA) to operate the route as a toll road. Construction then progressed much more rapidly, especially after 1954, when the authority was allowed to issue bonds not backed by the state (thus having higher interest rates). The roadway was completed between Buffalo and Albany in 1954, to New York City in 1956, to Pennsylvania in 1957, and to Massachusetts in 1959.

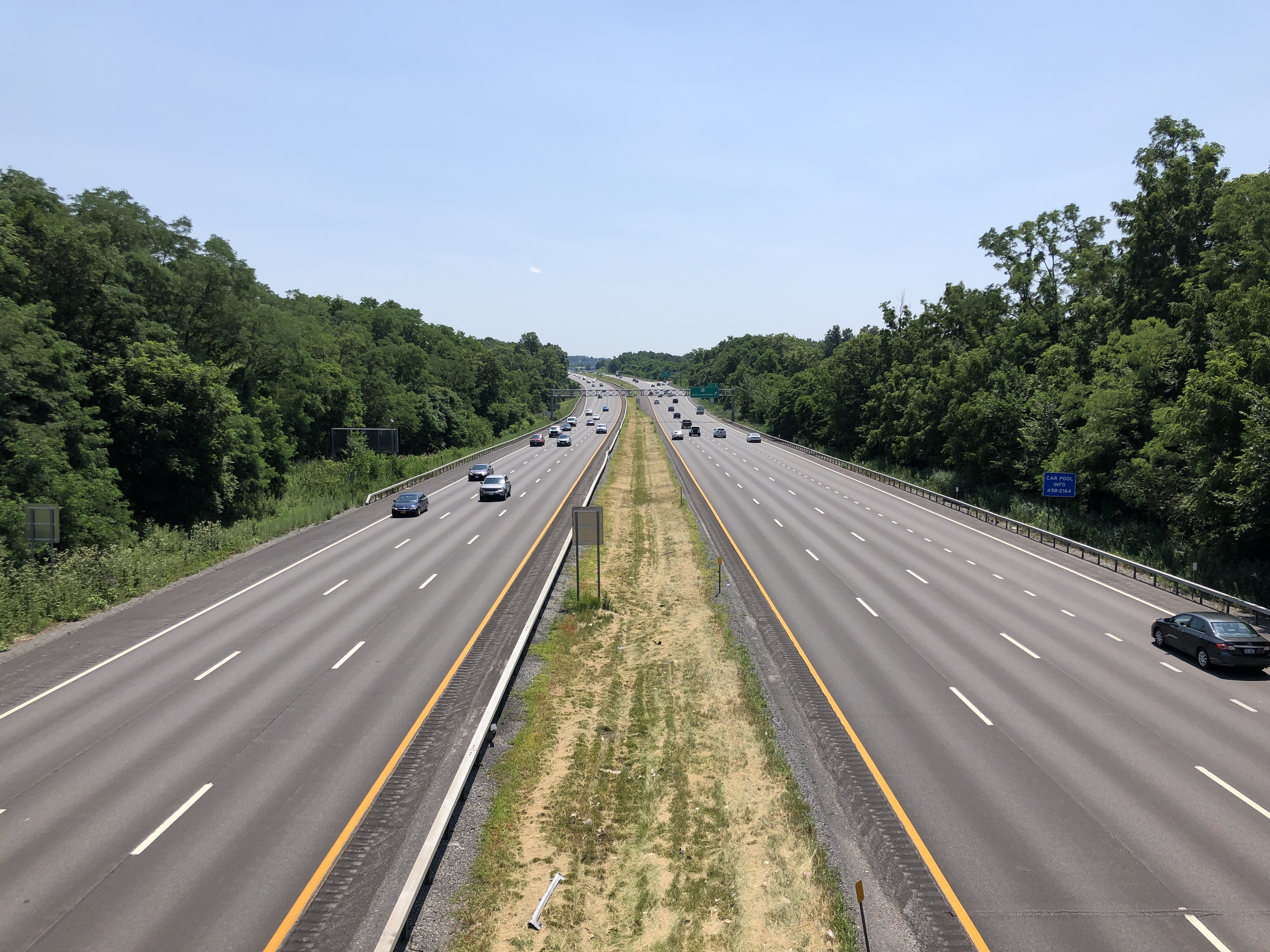
Free I-90 eastbound in Rensselaer

In the meantime, the National Interstate and Defense Highways Act was enacted in 1956, promising a toll-free network of Interstate Highways throughout the nation. The Bureau of Public Roads (BPR) commissioner soon announced that the toll road met all federal Interstate Highway standards, and, on August 14, 1957, most of the mainline of the Thruway was incorporated into the system as part of I-87 and I-90. Most of the connecting Massachusetts Turnpike was also included, but a more northerly alignment, avoiding the Berkshire Thruway, was proposed by the states of New York and Massachusetts for I-90 through Albany past Pittsfield to East Lee, Massachusetts. This alignment would be about 30 percent shorter than the all-toll alignment and would provide relief to the four-lane Castleton Bridge on the Berkshire Thruway, which had been built narrower than the rest of the system because of the planned parallel alternate. The BPR objected to the duplication, which would cost over $90 million (equivalent to $793 million in 2024), and refused to approve this alignment. The eventual route ran southeast from Albany to the Berkshire Thruway at the Nassau interchange, providing Albany with an alternate route and additional bridge but not offering any savings in distance and creating a "toll trap" for drivers accessing the Taconic State Parkway from Albany.

Construction on the route of I-90 through Albany began c. 1963, with both ends at existing Thruway interchanges: exit 24, which crossed the Adirondack Northway (I-87) at a cloverleaf interchange and connected to Washington Avenue in western Albany, and exit B1, which connected to US 9 near Nassau. Work on the freeway began at the Northway and progressed southeasterly to the Berkshire Connector in Rensselaer County. The portion between the Northway and Everett Road was opened to traffic in the mid-1960s while the piece extending from Everett Road to US 4 east of Rensselaer was completed in the early 1970s. The last section of the highway was completed to US 9 and US 20 in Schodack Center c. 1974 and finished by 1977. The Northway cloverleaf was rebuilt in the late 1980s.

In 1999, the New York State Department of Transportation (NYSDOT), the Federal Highway Administration (FHWA), and NYSTA discussed redesignating the Berkshire Connector as I-90 and redesignating the non-toll part of I-90 from Thruway exit 24 to exit B1 on the connector as I-88. The section of the Thruway between exits 25 and 24 would then be codesignated as both I-90 and I-88. This was never implemented.

== Exit list ==
The mileposts below for the non-Thruway section follow actual signage, where mile 0.00 is located at exit 24 of the Thruway.

All exits in New York use sequential numbering.

County	Location	mi	km	Exit	Destinations	Notes
Chautauqua	Ripley	496.00	798.23	–	I-90 west – Erie New York Thruway begins	Continuation into Pennsylvania; western terminus of New York Thruway
Chautauqua	Ripley	494.92	796.50	61	Shortman Road (NY 950D) to US 20 / NY 5 / NY 76 – Ripley	Last eastbound exit before toll
Chautauqua	Ripley	488.50	786.16	Ripley Toll Gantry (E-ZPass or Toll by Mail)		
Chautauqua	Town of Westfield	485.00	780.53	60	NY 394 – Westfield, Mayville	
Chautauqua	Town of Dunkirk	467.74	752.75	59	NY 60 – Dunkirk, Fredonia	
Chautauqua	Hanover	455.54	733.12	58	To US 20 / NY 5 – Silver Creek, Irving	Access to Lakeshore Hospital
Erie	Evans	446.60	718.73	Angola Service Area		
Erie	Evans	444.87	715.95	57A	Eden, Angola	
Erie	Town of Hamburg	436.22	702.03	57	NY 75 – Hamburg, East Aurora	
Erie	Town of Hamburg	432.45	695.96	56	NY 179 (Milestrip Road) to US 62 – Blasdell, Orchard Park	Orchard Park not signed westbound
Erie	Lackawanna	431.15	693.87	Lackawanna Toll Gantry (E-ZPass or Toll by Mail)		
Erie	West Seneca			55	Ridge Road – Lackawanna, West Seneca	Eastbound exit and westbound entrance; access via US 219
Erie	West Seneca	429.47	691.16	55	US 219 south – Orchard Park, Springville	Westbound exit and eastbound entrance; northern terminus of US 219; last westbound exit before toll
Erie	West Seneca	427.94	688.70	54	NY 400 south to NY 16 – West Seneca, East Aurora	Northern terminus of NY 400
Erie	Cheektowaga	426.17	685.85	53	I-190 north – Downtown Buffalo, Canada, Niagara Falls	Southern terminus of I-190
Erie	Cheektowaga	424.92	683.84	52A	William Street	
Erie	Cheektowaga	423.19	681.06	52	Walden Avenue – Cheektowaga, Buffalo	Signed as exits 52E (east) and 52W (west)
Erie	Cheektowaga	421.57	678.45	51	NY 33 – Buffalo, Buffalo Niagara International Airport	Signed as exits 51E (east) and 51W (west)
Erie	Cheektowaga	420.93	677.42	50A	Cleveland Drive	Eastbound exit and westbound entrance
Erie	Cheektowaga–Amherst town line	420.34	676.47	50	I-290 west – Niagara Falls	Eastern terminus of I-290; interchange formerly served NY 5; last eastbound exit before toll
Erie	Amherst	418.15	672.95	Williamsville Toll Gantry (E-ZPass or Toll by Mail)		
Erie	Cheektowaga–Amherst town line	417.27	671.53	49	NY 78 – Depew, Lockport, Buffalo Niagara International Airport	
Erie	Lancaster	411.60	662.41	Clarence Service Area (westbound)		
Genesee	Pembroke	401.72	646.51	48A	NY 77 – Pembroke, Medina	
Genesee	Pembroke	397.00	638.91	Pembroke Service Area (eastbound)		
Genesee	Town of Batavia	390.13	627.85	48	NY 98 – Batavia	
Genesee	Town of Le Roy	379.10	610.10	Toll Gantry (E-ZPass or Toll by Mail)		
Genesee	Town of Le Roy	378.56	609.23	47	I-490 east / NY 19 – Le Roy, Rochester	Western terminus of I-490
Genesee	Town of Le Roy	375.20	603.83	Ontario Service Area (westbound)		
Monroe	Chili	368.80	593.53	Toll Gantry (E-ZPass or Toll by Mail)		
Monroe	Henrietta	365.30	587.89	Scottsville Service Area (eastbound)		
Monroe	Henrietta	362.44	583.29	46	I-390 / NY 253 to NY 15 – Rochester, Corning	Exit 12B on I-390
Monroe	Town of Pittsford	358.10	576.31	Toll Gantry (E-ZPass or Toll by Mail)		
Ontario	Town of Victor				NY 96	Replaced by exit 45 c. 1970
Ontario	Town of Victor	350.99	564.86	45	I-490 west / NY 96 – Rochester, Victor	Victor not signed westbound; eastern terminus of I-490
Ontario	Town of Victor	349.20	561.98	Seneca Service Area (westbound)		
Ontario	Town of Victor	348.00	560.05	Toll Gantry (E-ZPass or Toll by Mail)		
Ontario	Farmington	347.13	558.65	44	NY 332 south – Canandaigua, Victor	Victor not signed eastbound; northern terminus of NY 332
Ontario	Town of Manchester	340.70	548.30	Toll Gantry (E-ZPass or Toll by Mail)		
Ontario	Town of Manchester	340.15	547.42	43	NY 21 to NY 96 – Manchester, Palmyra	
Ontario	Town of Manchester	336.90	542.19	Clifton Springs Service Area (eastbound)		
Ontario	Town of Phelps	327.10	526.42	42	NY 14 / NY 318 east – Geneva, Lyons	Western terminus of NY 318
Seneca	Junius	323.60	520.78	Junius Ponds Service Area (westbound)		
Seneca	Tyre	320.41	515.65	41	NY 414 – Waterloo, Clyde	
Cayuga	Montezuma	310.10	499.06	Port Byron Service Area (eastbound)		
Cayuga	Brutus	304.19	489.55	40	NY 34 – Weedsport, Auburn	
Onondaga	Van Buren	294.60	474.11	Toll Gantry (E-ZPass or Toll by Mail)		
Onondaga	Van Buren	291.30	468.80	Warners Service Area (westbound)		
Onondaga	Van Buren	289.53	465.95	39	I-690 east / NY 690 north – Syracuse, Fulton	Western terminus and exit 6 on I-690; southern terminus of NY 690
Onondaga	Van Buren	288.80	464.78	Toll Gantry (E-ZPass or Toll by Mail)		
Onondaga	Salina	285.95	460.19	38	CR 57 – Liverpool, Syracuse	
Onondaga	Salina	283.79	456.72	37	Electronics Parkway – Liverpool, Syracuse	Signed for Liverpool westbound, Syracuse eastbound
Onondaga	Salina	283.40	456.09	Toll Gantry (E-ZPass or Toll by Mail)		
Onondaga	Salina	282.93	455.33	36	I-81 BL – Watertown, Binghamton, Syracuse Airport	Exit 7 on BL I-81
Onondaga	Salina	281.30	452.71	Toll Gantry (E-ZPass or Toll by Mail)		
Onondaga	DeWitt	279.40	449.65	DeWitt Service Area (eastbound)		
Onondaga	DeWitt	278.93	448.89	35	NY 298 / NY 635 / Carrier Circle – Syracuse, East Syracuse	
Onondaga	DeWitt	277.50	446.59	Toll Gantry (E-ZPass or Toll by Mail)		
Onondaga	DeWitt	276.58	445.11	34A	I-81 to I-690 – Syracuse, Oswego, Chittenango	Exit 90 on I-81; signed for Oswego westbound, Chittenango eastbound
Onondaga	Town of Manlius	276.10	444.34	Toll Gantry (E-ZPass or Toll by Mail)		
Madison	Sullivan	266.20	428.41	Chittenango Service Area (westbound)		
Madison	Canastota	261.50	420.84	34	NY 13 – Canastota, Chittenango, Oneida	Signed for Chittenango westbound, Oneida eastbound
Oneida	Verona	252.71	406.70	33	NY 365 – Verona, Oneida, Rome	Signed for Oneida westbound, Rome eastbound
Oneida	Westmoreland	244.00	392.68	Oneida Service Area (eastbound)		
Oneida	Westmoreland	243.37	391.67	32	NY 233 – Westmoreland, Rome	Access via Cider Street; Rome not signed eastbound
Oneida	Utica	232.85	374.74	31	I-790 west / NY 8 / NY 12 – Utica, Rome	Rome not signed eastbound; eastern terminus of I-790
Herkimer	Schuyler	227.00	365.32	Schuyler Service Area (westbound)		
Herkimer	Village of Herkimer	219.70	353.57	30	NY 28 – Herkimer, Mohawk	
Herkimer	Danube	210.62	338.96	29A	To NY 169 – Little Falls, Dolgeville	
Herkimer	Danube	209.90	337.80	Indian Castle-Iroquois Service Area		
Montgomery	Town of Canajoharie	194.10	312.37	29	To NY 10 – Canajoharie, Sharon Springs	Access via NY 5S
Montgomery	Root			Mohawk Valley Welcome Center (westbound)		
Montgomery	Fultonville	182.17	293.17	28	NY 30A – Fultonville, Fonda	Access to Fulton County Airport
Montgomery	Florida–Amsterdam line	173.59	279.37	27	NY 30 – Amsterdam	
Montgomery	Florida	171.80	276.49	Mohawk Service Area (eastbound)		
Montgomery	Florida	168.20	270.69	Pattersonville Service Area (westbound)		
Schenectady	Rotterdam	162.22	261.07	26	I-890 east / NY 5S west to NY 5 – Schenectady, Scotia	Western terminus and exit 1B on I-890; access to NY 5 via NY 890
Schenectady	Rotterdam	161.00	259.10	Toll Gantry (E-ZPass or Toll by Mail)		
Schenectady	Rotterdam	158.82	255.60	25A	I-88 west to NY 7 – Schenectady, Binghamton	Eastern terminus of I-88
Schenectady	Rotterdam	157.80	253.95	Toll Gantry (E-ZPass or Toll by Mail)		
Albany	Guilderland	153.83	247.57	25	I-890 west / NY 7 to NY 146 – Schenectady	Eastern terminus of I-890
Albany	Guilderland	152.80	245.91	Guilderland Service Area (eastbound)		
Albany	Albany	149.60	240.76	Toll Gantry (E-ZPass or Toll by Mail)		
Albany	Albany	148.15 0.00	238.42 0.00	24	I-87 Toll south / New York Thruway south to Mass Pike east – New York City	Eastern end of Thruway concurrency; western end of I-87 concurrency; exit number not signed westbound
Albany	Albany			1	I-87 north to US 20 (Western Avenue) – Albany International Airport, Montreal, Saratoga	Access to US 20 via NY 910F; signed as exits 1S (US 20) and 1N (I-87); eastern end of I-87 concurrency; last westbound exit before toll
Albany	Albany	0.80	1.29	2	Fuller Road (CR 156) / Washington Avenue (NY 910D west) – UAlbany	Signed for Fuller Road westbound, Washington Avenue eastbound
Albany	Albany	1.85	2.98	3	State Offices	Access via Campus Access Road
Albany	Albany	2.19	3.52	4	NY 85 west – Slingerlands, Voorheesville	Eastern terminus of NY 85
Albany	Albany	3.19	5.13	5	CR 155 (Everett Road) to NY 5	
Albany	Albany	3.80	6.12	5A	Corporate Woods Boulevard	Formerly planned for I-687
Albany	Albany	5.10	8.21	6	US 9 – Loudonville, Arbor Hill	
Albany	Albany	6.16	9.91	6A	I-787 – Troy, Albany	Exit 5 on I-787; access to MVP Arena and Albany–Rensselaer station
Hudson River		6.41	10.32	Patroon Island Bridge		
Rensselaer	Rensselaer	6.92	11.14	7	Washington Avenue – Rensselaer	Eastbound exit and westbound entrance
Rensselaer	North Greenbush	7.73	12.44	8	NY 43 east – Defreestville	Western terminus of NY 43
Rensselaer	East Greenbush	9.47	15.24	9	US 4 – East Greenbush, Rensselaer, Troy	
Rensselaer	Schodack	13.10	21.08	10	CR 54 (Miller Road) – Schodack Center, East Greenbush	
Rensselaer	Schodack	14.51	23.35	11	US 9 / US 20 – East Greenbush, Nassau	Signed as exits 11W (north/west) and 11E (south/east) eastbound
Rensselaer	Schodack	19.57	31.49	12	US 9 – Hudson, Castleton-on-Hudson	Last eastbound exit before toll
Rensselaer	Schodack	19.99	32.17	Exit B1 Toll Gantry (E-ZPass or Toll by Mail)		
Rensselaer	Schodack	20.39 6.58	32.81 10.59	B1	Berkshire Connector west to I-87 Toll / New York Thruway – New York City, Buffalo	Western end of Berkshire Connector concurrency; exit number not signed eastbound; former routing of I-90
Columbia	Chatham	15.09	24.29	B2	Taconic State Parkway south to NY 295 – Chatham, East Chatham, Canaan	Access to NY 295 via Upper Cady Road; northern terminus of Taconic State Parkway
Columbia	Canaan	18.1	29.1	Canaan Toll Gantry (E-ZPass or Toll by Mail)		
Columbia	Canaan	23.27	37.45	B3	NY 22 – Austerlitz, New Lebanon, West Stockbridge, Stockbridge	
Columbia	Canaan	24.28	39.07	–	I-90 Toll east / Mass Pike east – Boston Berkshire Connector ends	Continuation into Massachusetts; eastern terminus of Berkshire Connector
1.000 mi = 1.609 km; 1.000 km = 0.621 mi: Concurrency terminus; Electronic toll collection; Closed/former; Incomplete access

== Auxiliary routes ==
- I-190 runs from I-90/NY Thruway along the Niagara Thruway/Expressway to its terminus at the Canadian border on the Lewiston–Queenston Bridge.
- I-290 runs from I-190 to I-90, and provides the fastest road link between Toronto and the Northeastern United States.
- I-390 runs from the Southern Tier Expressway (I-86/NY 17), travels 76 miles to Rochester and ends at I-490.
- I-490 serves the city of Rochester and comprises part of the Inner Loop.
- I-590 serves the city of Rochester and connects I-390 and I-490.
- I-690 serves the city of Syracuse and its downtown.
- I-790 serves the city of Utica, and is concurrent with NY 5 during its whole 2.41 miles (3.88 kilometers)
- I-890 serves the city of Schenectady, and serves its downtown.
- I-990 is the highest number interstate in the whole system.

== See also ==
- New York State Thruway

Interstate 90
Previous state: Pennsylvania	New York	Next state: Massachusetts
