= Manchester, New York =

Manchester
- Town
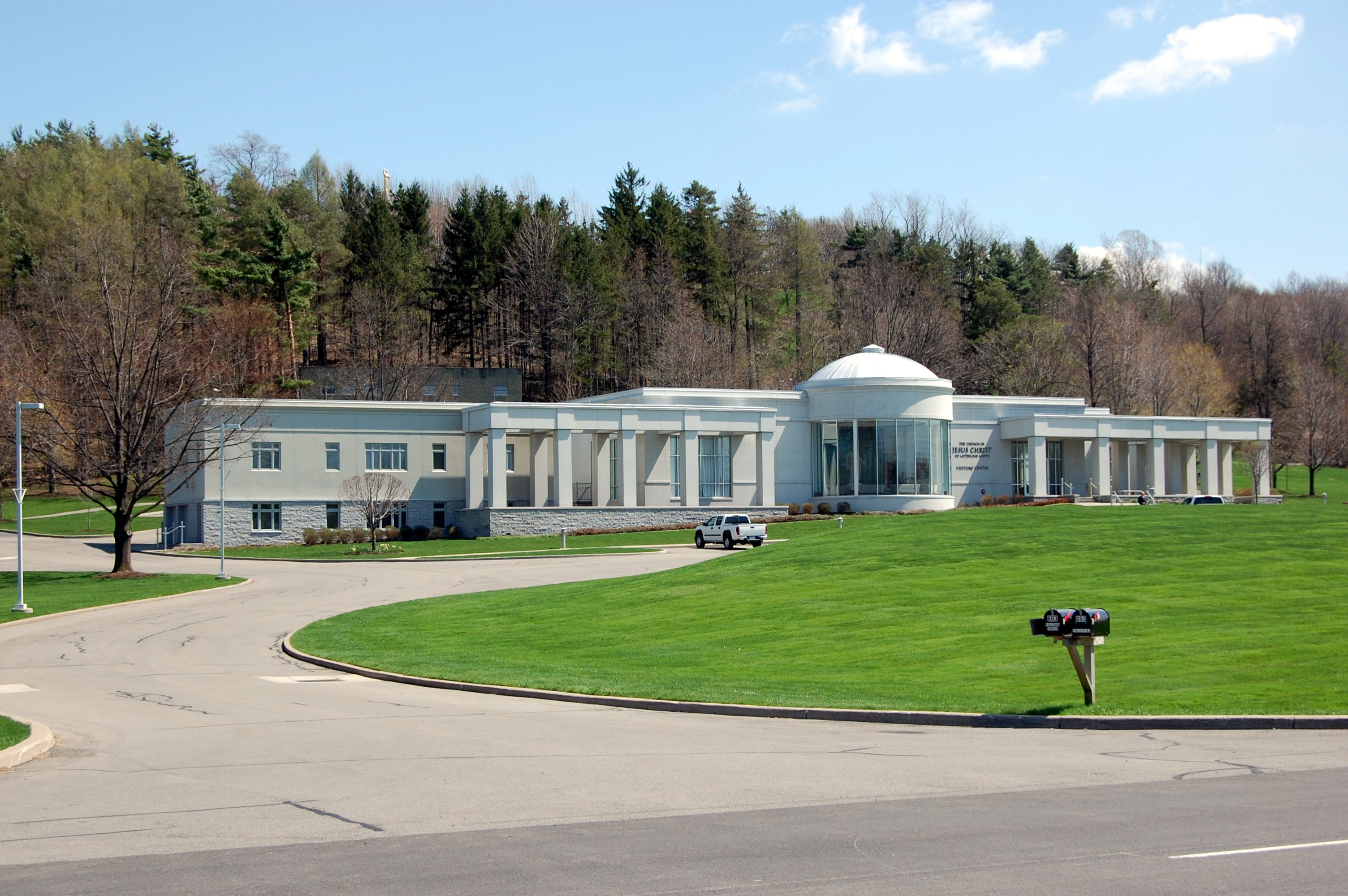
- Hill Cumorah Visitor Center

- Location of Manchester in New York state Manchester (the United States)
- Coordinates: 42°58′10″N 077°13′34″W
- Country: United States
- State: New York
- County: Ontario

Government
  - Town Supervisor: David W. Phillips (R)
  - Town Council: Members: Douglas J. Davis (D); Matt A. Schaertl (R); Charles M. Denosky (R)

Area
  - Total: 37.85 sq mi (98.03 km^{2})
  - Land: 37.82 sq mi (97.95 km^{2})
  - Water: 0.031 sq mi (0.08 km^{2})

Population (2020)
  - Total: 9,406 ▲
  - Estimate (2021): 9,393
  - Density: 246.4/sq mi (95.12/km^{2})
- Time zone: UTC-5 (EST)
  - Summer (DST): UTC-4 (EDT)
- Zip Code: 14504
- Area codes: 315, 585 and 680
- FIPS code: 36-069-44864
- Website: Town website

Manchester is a town in Ontario County, New York, United States. The population was 9,406 at the 2020 census. The town was named after one of its villages, which in turn was named after the city of Manchester in England. It was formed in 1822 from the town of Farmington.

The Town of Manchester includes a village also named Manchester. The town is northeast of the city of Canandaigua.

== Lehigh Valley Railroad ==
Manchester was an important division point and car classification yard for the Lehigh Valley Railroad and was, at one time, the largest such facility in the world. As a division point, crews and locomotives were exchanged. Freight cars were switched from track to track, organizing them for delivery to their destinations. Support services included the 30-stall roundhouse, the coaling tower, facilities for ash removal, track maintenance, car repair, a control tower, the yard office, an ice house, and the bunkhouse-restaurant.

With the failure of the Pennsylvania Railroad (which had taken over operations of the Lehigh Valley Railroad in 1962) in the mid-60s, the division yard's purpose was largely unneeded. By the next decade, all that remained in use at the yard was the mainline travelling through the town. The yard closed on October 30, 1972.

As of April 2025, XXX Contractors are in the process of maintaining and potentially obtaining the land on which the 1916 roundhouse, turntable, and office buildings are situated for potential renovation or redevelopment.

== Geography ==
According to the United States Census Bureau, the town has a total area of 37.8 square miles (97.9 km^{2}), of which 37.8 square miles is land and (0.08%) is water.

The Erie Canal, a part called the Wide Waters, briefly passes through the northeastern corner of the town, and the New York State Thruway (Interstate 90) passes through the center. New York State Route 96 is a major highway that parallels the Thruway and intersects New York State Route 21 in Manchester village.

The northern town line is the border of Wayne County (Palmyra).

Cumorah, a hill in Manchester, is the location where Joseph Smith is said to have found a set of golden plates which he translated into English and published as the Book of Mormon.

On October 23, 1844, local farmer and Millerite named Hiram Edson had an ecstatic vision in the wake of The Great Disappointment while crossing his cornfield in Manchester near Port Gibson. This vision became one of the foundational events of the Seventh-day Adventist Church.

== Demographics ==
Historical population
Census	Pop.	Note	%±
1830	2,811		—
1840	2,912		3.6%
1850	2,940		1.0%
1860	3,280		11.6%
1870	3,546		8.1%
1880	3,920		10.5%
1890	4,439		13.2%
1900	4,733		6.6%
1910	4,889		3.3%
1920	5,567		13.9%
1930	5,882		5.7%
1940	5,252		−10.7%
1950	5,755		9.6%
1960	6,242		8.5%
1970	7,840		25.6%
1980	9,002		14.8%
1990	9,351		3.9%
2000	9,258		−1.0%
2010	9,395		1.5%
2020	9,406		0.1%
2021 (est.)	9,393	▼	−0.1%
U.S. Decennial Census

As of the census of 2000, there were 9,258 people, 3,589 households, and 2,447 families residing in the town. The population density was 245.0 inhabitants per square mile (94.6/km^{2}). There were 3,815 housing units at an average density of 39.0 persons/km^{2} (101.0 persons/sq mi). The racial makeup of the town was 97.69% White, 0.53% African American, 0.37% Native American, 0.21% Asian, 0.00% Pacific Islander, 0.14% from other races, and 1.07% from two or more races. 1.14% of the population were Hispanic or Latino of any race.

There were 3,589 households, out of which 32.2% had children under the age of 18 living with them, 53.2% were married couples living together, 10.4% have a woman whose husband does not live with her, and 31.8% were non-families. 25.2% of all households were made up of individuals, and 12.7% had someone living alone who was 65 years of age or older. The average household size was 2.51 and the average family size was 3.01.

In the town, the population was spread out, with 24.8% under the age of 18, 6.5% from 18 to 24, 29.8% from 25 to 44, 23.7% from 45 to 64, and 15.2% who were 65 years of age or older. The median age was 38 years. For every 100 females, there were 95.8 males. For every 100 females age 18 and over, there were 92.6 males.

The median income for a household in the town was $39,154, and the median income for a family was $47,117. Males had a median income of $32,444 versus $25,041 for females. The per capita income for the town was $19,285. About 6.3% of families and 8.4% of the population were below the poverty line, including 13.0% under the age of 18 and 3.5% age 65 or older.

== Communities and locations in town ==
- Bunker Hill – A location in the northeast part of the town west of Gypsum.
- Clifton Springs – The western part of the Village of Clifton Springs is in the town.
- Gypsum – A hamlet at the east town line on County Road 27. It has previously been called "Dutch Settlement" and "Plainville."
- Littleville – A hamlet by the south town line on County Road 19. It was first called Parkers Mills after Mill owner Edward Parker. The name changed when Norman Little purchased the mill.
- Manchester – The village of Manchester on NY-21.
- Manchester Center – A hamlet in the east part of the town, on the north side of the Thruway on County Road 7.
- Port Gibson – A hamlet (and census-designated place) on the north town line on County Road 7. It is the only community in the county on the Erie Canal. The Port Gibson United Methodist Church was listed on the National Register of Historic Places in 1996.
- Shortsville – The village of Shortsville is south of Manchester village on NY-21.
