= Oliver Warner Farmstead =

- U.S. National Register of Historic Places
- U.S. Historic district
- Location within New York Location within the United States
- Nearest city: Clifton Springs, New York
- Coordinates: 42°54′51″N 77°7′51″W
- Area: 203 acres (82 ha)
- Built: 1840
- Architect: Warner, Oliver
- Architectural style: Greek Revival, Federal
- NRHP reference No.: 88002189
- Added to NRHP: November 17, 1988

Oliver Warner Farmstead is a historic farm complex and national historic district located in the towns of Hopewell and Phelps near Clifton Springs in Ontario County, New York. The 203-acre (82 ha) district contains three contributing buildings. The buildings are a cobblestone farmhouse built about 1840 in the late Federal / early Greek Revival style, a 19th-century barn, and 19th century wagon house / machine shed.

It was listed on the National Register of Historic Places in 1988.
