= Colvin Central Plaza =

Strip mall in Albany, New York, US

Colvin Central Plaza was a large strip mall in Albany, New York, along Central Avenue, a major business and shopping area of the New York State Capital Region. For this area, it was significant as it was over 100,000 square feet (9,300 m^{2}) and was initially opened in 1981. It survived in this form for two decades.

It was located at 42°41′04″N 73°47′35″W, near the Westgate Plaza. The property is now known as Capital Center and is the location of a Home Depot store.

== History ==
The mall was developed by Bella Vista Development of Monroe County, Inc. (a real estate developer in Bowman, New York). The strip mall was opened in February 1981 with original tenants Price Chopper and Caldor.

The mall was then turned over to the City of Albany Industrial Development Agency on September 28, 1991. Westmont 80 of Pittsburgh then purchased the property from IDA at a cost of $4.2 million. The property was mortgaged by Aetna Casualty and Surety Co. of Hartford, Connecticut. Aetna later sold the mortgage to Unum Insurance Co. of America, Inc. of Portland, Maine.

Price Chopper closed in 1995, moving to Westgate Plaza, although it continued to pay rent for lease.

Unum began foreclosure on the mall in September, 1996.

For one week in November 1996, J. Crew used the empty Price Chopper space for a reduced priced "warehouse sale."

A foreclosure sale was held on January 10, 1997. As there were no bids for the property at that point, Unum took ownership.

Caldor closed in March 1998 In 1999, the Caldor store was demolished to make room for a new Grand Union store. Grand Union later opened a Mega Save store there, but closed it in 2001.

On April 12, 1999, Columbia Development Cos. LLC purchased the property from Unum, at a cost of $3.995 million. The company created Columbia Colvin LLC to own the property.

In 1999, Columbia Colvin, LLC borrowed $6.88 million from CIBC, Inc. of New York City to build a 65,000-square-foot (6,000 m^{2}) Grand Union store on the property after demolishing the space formerly occupied by Caldor. The new store was scheduled to open in 2000.

In 2001, Home Depot purchased the plaza and began demolishing the structures, including the newer Grand Union store.

Discount Carpet and Rainbow Rentals closed before September 21, 2001, due to demolition.

== Other tenants ==
Other tenants included Fay's Drug, which moved to Westgate Plaza, and a Denny's restaurant on the outparcel.

== Vacanies ==
When Price Chopper and Fay's exited the strip mall to move to Westgate Plaza, only Caldor remained in the main strip mall. Denny's occupied an out building on the site. At that time, it was claimed that various entities were considering renting space. Both Caldor's and Denny's had the right to prevent direct competitors from moving onto the property. Price Chopper and Fay's continued to pay rent at the time they left because their leases had not yet terminated.

== Size ==
Prior to 1999 when demolition of the Caldor space took place, the retail space was 137,690 square feet.

By 2001, after the Grand Union Mega Save had been built (after demolition of the Caldor space), the size of the strip mall was 117,481 square feet.

== Visibility ==
Visibility had been cited as an issue for the plaza. It was not as easily seen from Central Avenue, among all the other businesses. However, it had been said that it had great visibility from I-90.

== Name change ==
In mid-2001, the name was changed from Colvin Central Plaza to Capital Center. Shortly thereafter, Home Depot signed a contract for a new 116,279-square-foot (10,802.7 m^{2}) store, which would replace the plaza.
