= Clifton Springs, New York =

- Village
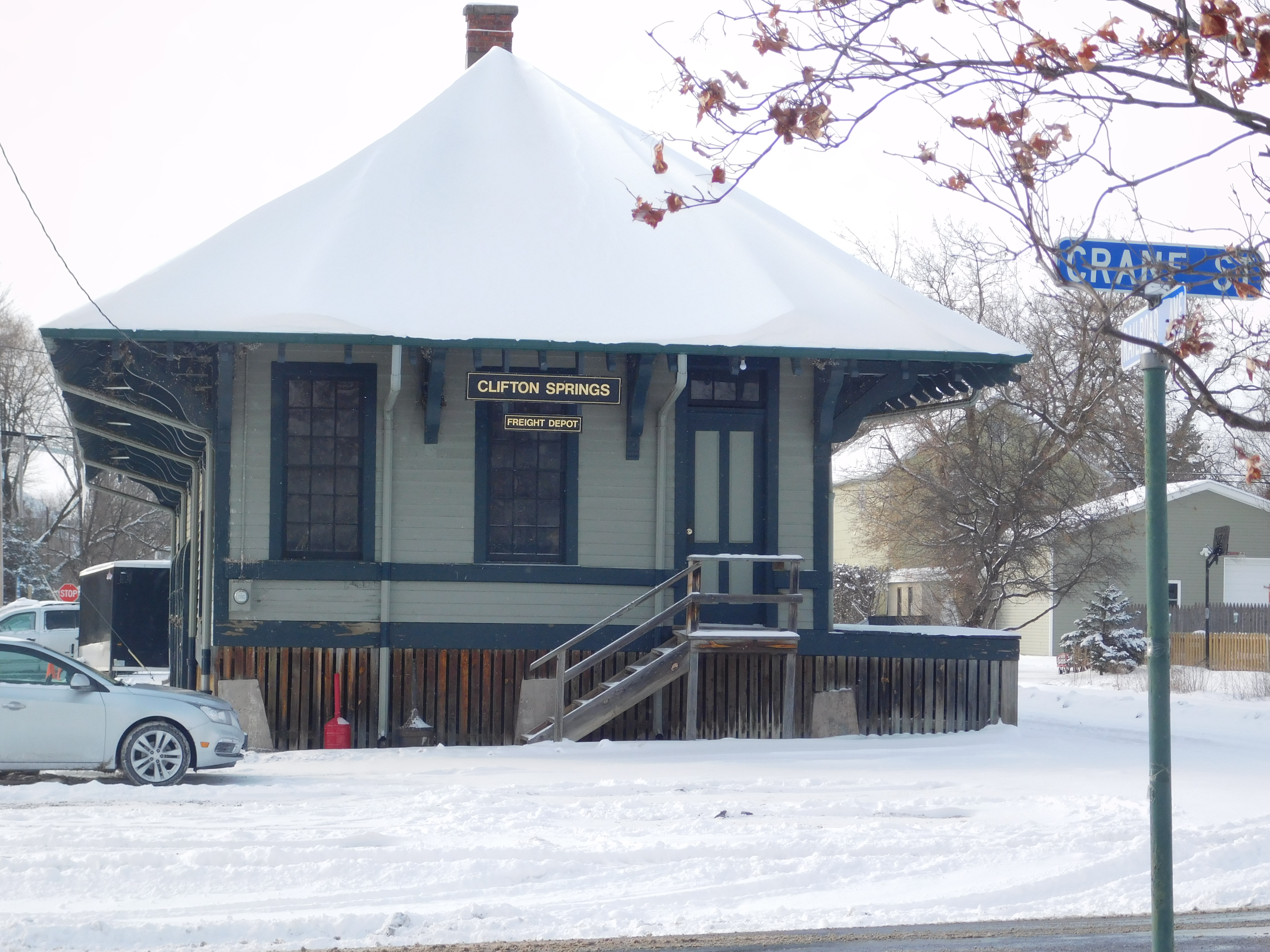
- The former New York Central Railroad freight station in Clifton Springs

- Location within the state of New York
- Coordinates: 42°57′44″N 77°8′15″W
- Country: United States
- State: New York
- County: Ontario

Area
  - Total: 1.48 sq mi (3.84 km^{2})
  - Land: 1.48 sq mi (3.84 km^{2})
  - Water: 0 sq mi (0.00 km^{2})
- Elevation: 577 ft (176 m)

Population (2020)
  - Total: 2,209
  - Density: 1,490.0/sq mi (575.31/km^{2})
- Time zone: UTC-5 (Eastern (EST))
  - Summer (DST): UTC-4 (EDT)
- ZIP code: 14432
- Area codes: 315 and 680
- FIPS code: 36-16375
- GNIS feature ID: 0970014

Clifton Springs is a village located in Ontario County, New York, United States. The population was 2,209 at the 2020 Census. The village takes its name from local mineral springs.

The Village of Clifton Springs is located primarily in the Town of Manchester, but the eastern part is in the Town of Phelps. The village is southeast of Rochester, NY.

(The area and population reported and analyzed in this article are also reflected in the aggregate values reported for the town as a whole. See: Manchester (town), New York.)

== History ==
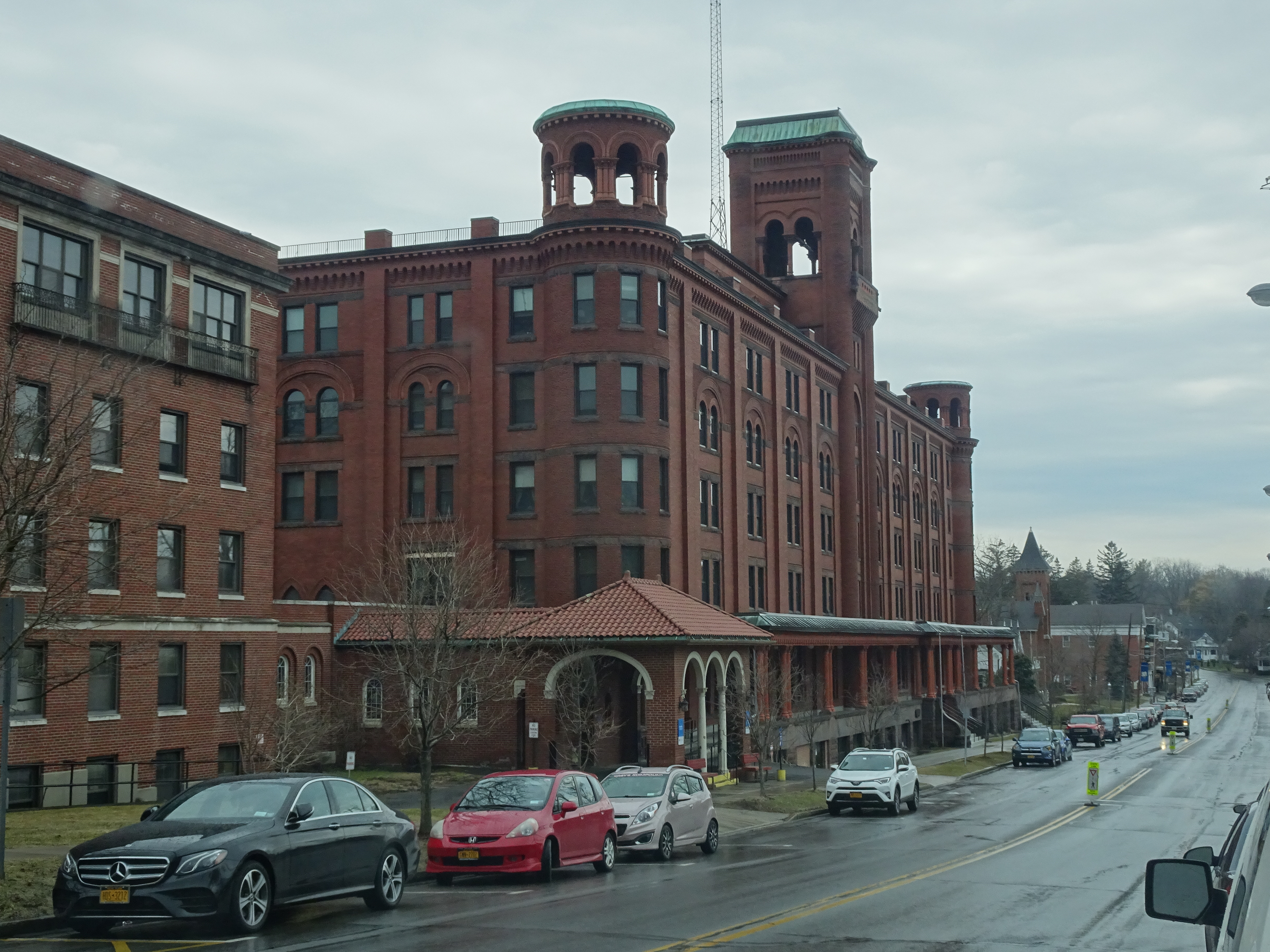
Historic sanitarium in 2018

The location was first settled around 1801, and much of the early community endeavors exploited the sulfur springs as a health spa. The village was incorporated in 1859.

The development of the area was slow until 1849, when Dr. Henry Foster came looking for a place to begin his water cure. Modern medicine was in its early stages, and it was thought that the sulphur waters together with a strong religious revival could restore many to active and useful lives. Sulphur Springs, as it was once called, was well known throughout the eastern part of the US because of this. Over the years, thousands of people came to enjoy the benefits of the water and rest and regain their health. Some famous people who visited the area were Elvis Presley, and Bette Davis' daughter. The area around the former sanitarium was designated the Clifton Springs Sanitarium Historic District and listed on the National Register of Historic Places in 1990.

In March 1917, a local convalescent and architect George Edward Barton assembled a small group of authorities from around the country to discuss the benefits of the "work cure", or the value of activity in promoting recovery. During that meeting, the profession of occupational therapy was born with the incorporation of what is now The American Occupational Therapy Association. In 1968, a plaque was placed on Barton's home, known as Consolation House, to commemorate the 50th anniversary of the profession. Between 1915 and 1921, Barton maintained Consolation House as a convalescent home employing therapeutic activity.

Today, there has been a revival of interest in bathing at mineral springs. The Clifton Springs Hospital & Clinic has devoted an entire wing to this treatment.

Modern-day Clifton Springs offers a modern hospital, YMCA, Chamber of Commerce, Rotary Club and numerous other organizations, country club/golf course, national bank, library, senior citizen community, volunteer fire department, a park area, tennis courts, a skate park, shaded streets, a large manufacturing firm, and an active business section. In the summer months, the town participates in a business program dubbed "Super Sundays."

The Phelps-Clifton Springs Central School District serves the students who live in Clifton Springs. The school district, also known as Midlakes, serves the students of the area.

The Oliver Warner Farmstead was listed on the National Register of Historic Places in 1988.

== Geography ==
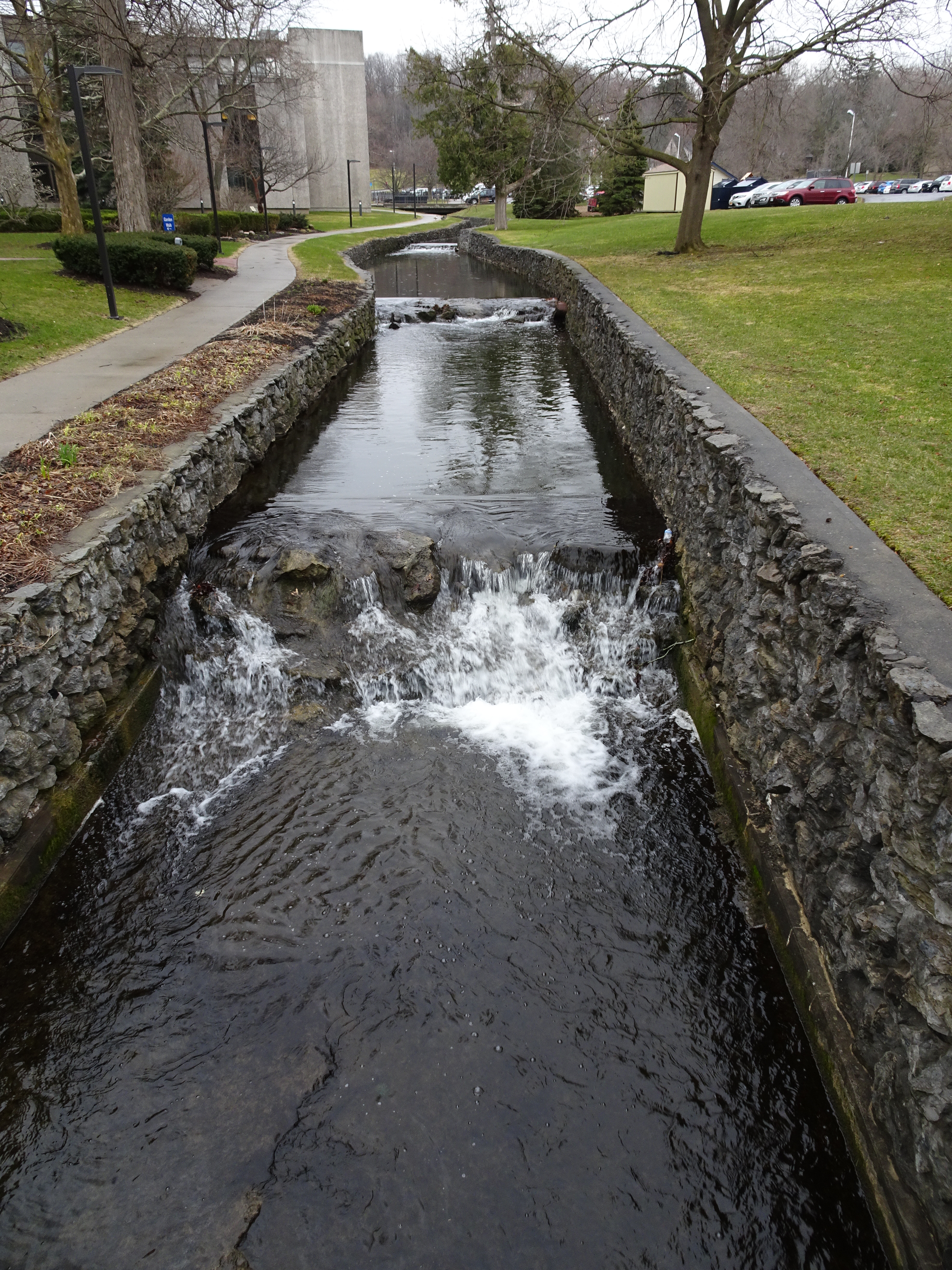
Creek that flows by hospital and sanitarium, then under buildings downtown

Clifton Springs is located at 42°57′44″N 77°8′15″W (42.962310, -77.137362).

According to the United States Census Bureau, the village has a total area of 1.4 square miles (3.6 km^{2}), all land.

Clifton Springs is immediately south of both the New York State Thruway (Interstate 90) and New York State Route 96. County Road 13 passes through the village as Main Street.

== Demographics ==
Historical population
Census	Pop.	Note	%±
1870	746		—
1880	902		20.9%
1890	1,297		43.8%
1900	1,617		24.7%
1910	1,600		−1.1%
1920	1,628		1.8%
1930	1,819		11.7%
1940	1,413		−22.3%
1950	1,838		30.1%
1960	1,953		6.3%
1970	2,058		5.4%
1980	2,039		−0.9%
1990	2,175		6.7%
2000	2,223		2.2%
2010	2,127		−4.3%
2020	2,209		3.9%
U.S. Decennial Census

=== 2020 census ===
As of the 2020 census, Clifton Springs had a population of 2,209. The median age was 48.0 years. 19.0% of residents were under the age of 18 and 29.3% of residents were 65 years of age or older. For every 100 females there were 81.8 males, and for every 100 females age 18 and over there were 80.0 males age 18 and over.

93.8% of residents lived in urban areas, while 6.2% lived in rural areas.

There were 866 households in Clifton Springs, of which 28.9% had children under the age of 18 living in them. Of all households, 38.2% were married-couple households, 18.0% were households with a male householder and no spouse or partner present, and 36.0% were households with a female householder and no spouse or partner present. About 36.7% of all households were made up of individuals and 20.7% had someone living alone who was 65 years of age or older.

There were 898 housing units, of which 3.6% were vacant. The homeowner vacancy rate was 0.0% and the rental vacancy rate was 1.6%.

Racial composition as of the 2020 census
Race	Number	Percent
White	2,029	91.9%
Black or African American	35	1.6%
American Indian and Alaska Native	5	0.2%
Asian	8	0.4%
Native Hawaiian and Other Pacific Islander	0	0.0%
Some other race	42	1.9%
Two or more races	90	4.1%
Hispanic or Latino (of any race)	99	4.5%

=== 2000 census ===
As of the census of 2000, there were 2,223 people, 869 households, and 530 families residing in the village. The population density was 1,541.4 inhabitants per square mile (595.1/km^{2}). There were 921 housing units at an average density of 638.6 per square mile (246.6/km^{2}). The racial makeup of the village was 97.57% White, 1.21% African American, 0.13% Native American, 0.18% Asian, 0.22% from other races, and 0.67% from two or more races. Hispanic or Latino people of any race were 0.81% of the population.

There were 869 households, out of which 31.3% had children under the age of 18 living with them, 45.3% were married couples living together, 12.2% had a female householder with no husband present, and 38.9% were non-families. 34.3% of all households were made up of individuals, and 20.6% had someone living alone who was 65 years of age or older. The average household size was 2.33 and the average family size was 3.02.

In the village, the population was spread out, with 23.6% under the age of 18, 6.5% from 18 to 24, 27.6% from 25 to 44, 21.9% from 45 to 64, and 20.4% who were 65 years of age or older. The median age was 40 years. For every 100 females, there were 85.3 males. For every 100 females age 18 and over, there were 79.9 males.

The median income for a household in the village was $36,595, and the median income for a family was $49,485. Males had a median income of $33,929 versus $24,250 for females. The per capita income for the village was $17,238. About 8.0% of families and 13.1% of the population were below the poverty line, including 15.7% of those under age 18 and 9.0% of those age 65 or over.

== In popular culture ==
Chef John Mitzewich, on his video blog Food Wishes, dedicated a ginger and garlic glazed chicken wing to his town of birth, naming his recipe "Clifton Springs Chicken Wings". The episode has currently been viewed over 2.7 million times according to YouTube statistics.

Steven Page, formerly of the Barenaked Ladies, has a song titled "Clifton Springs" on his solo album Page One, released in 2010.
