= Harmon Cobblestone Farmhouse and Cobblestone Smokehouse =

Historic house in New York, United States

- U.S. National Register of Historic Places
- Location within New York Location within the United States
- Location: 983 Smith Rd., Phelps, New York
- Coordinates: 42°59′31″N 77°7′29″W
- Area: 2.8 acres (1.1 ha)
- Built: 1842
- Architectural style: Greek Revival
- MPS: Cobblestone Architecture of New York State MPS
- NRHP reference No.: 92000552
- Added to NRHP: May 22, 1992

Harmon Cobblestone Farmhouse and Cobblestone Smokehouse is a historic home located at Phelps in Ontario County, New York. The farmhouse was constructed in 1842 and is an example of vernacular Greek Revival style, cobblestone domestic architecture. The house consists of a 2-story, three-bay side-hall main block with a 1 1/2-story north wing and 1-story east wing. The exterior walls are built primarily of small, red, oval, lake washed cobbles. Also on the property is a smokehouse built of both red, lake washed cobbles and irregular field cobbles. They are among the approximately 101 cobblestone buildings in Ontario County and 26 in the village and town of Phelps.

It was listed on the National Register of Historic Places in 1992.
