= Clifton Springs Sanitarium Historic District =

Historic district in New York, United States

- U.S. National Register of Historic Places
- U.S. Historic district
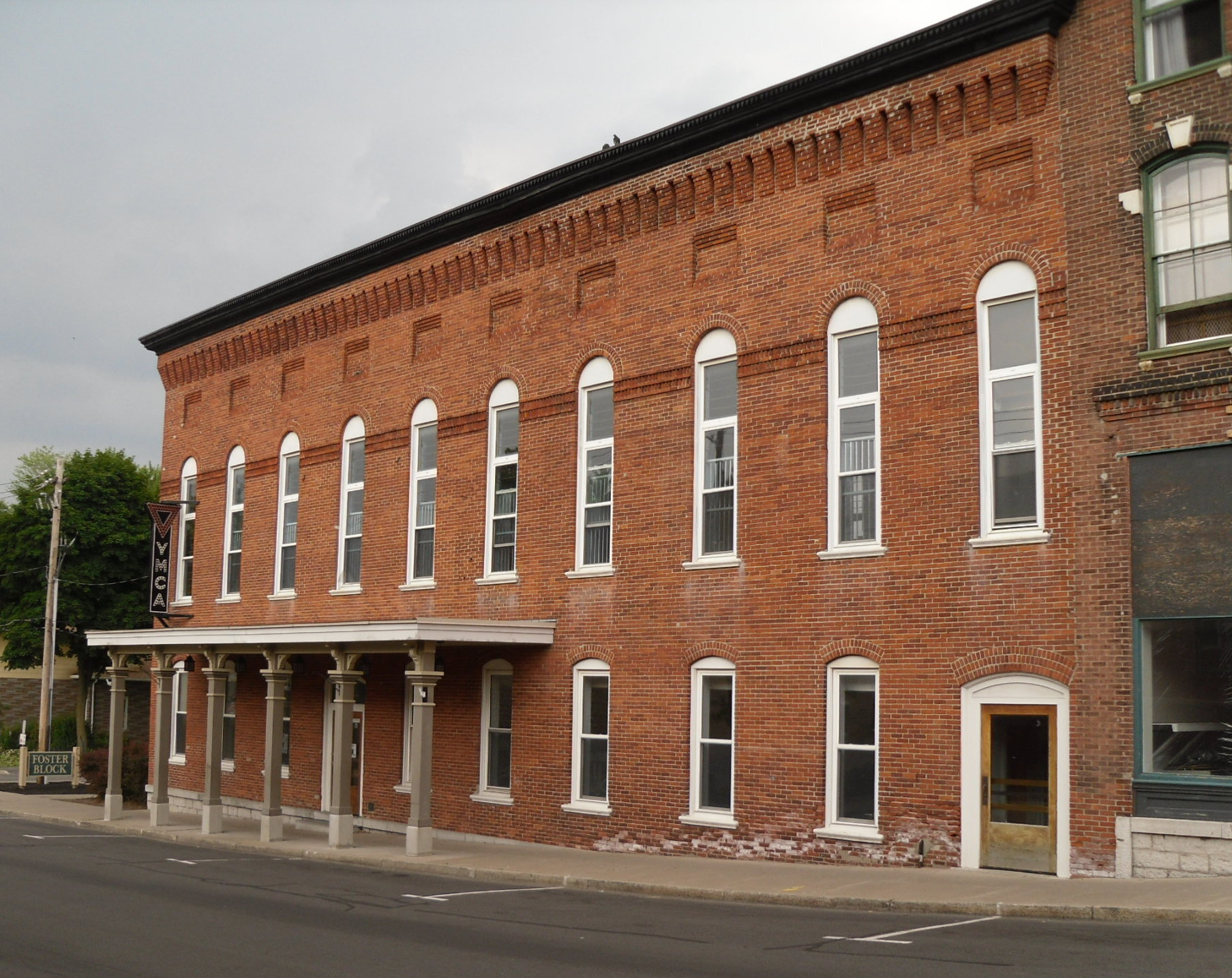
- YMCA building, May 2010

- Location within New York Location within the United States
- Location: E. Main St. between Crane and Prospect, Clifton Springs, New York
- Coordinates: 42°57′40″N 77°8′13″W
- Area: 7.5 acres (3.0 ha)
- Architect: Pierce & Bickford et al.
- Architectural style: Classical Revival, Romanesque, Gothic Revival
- NRHP reference No.: 90000818
- Added to NRHP: May 24, 1990

Clifton Springs Sanitarium Historic District is a national historic district located at the Village of Clifton Springs in Ontario County, New York. The district includes the previously listed main Clifton Springs Sanitarium and Foster Cottage. The expansion includes all the surrounding structures directly associated with the sanitarium during the historic period and the remaining intact portion of the original landscaped grounds. The additional structures include the Foster Block (1865, with 1899 and 1920 additions); the YMCA (1879), the current sanitarium (1896), Maxwell Hall (1926), and the Woodbury Building with connecting pavilion (1927).

It was listed on the National Register of Historic Places in 1990.

== Gallery ==
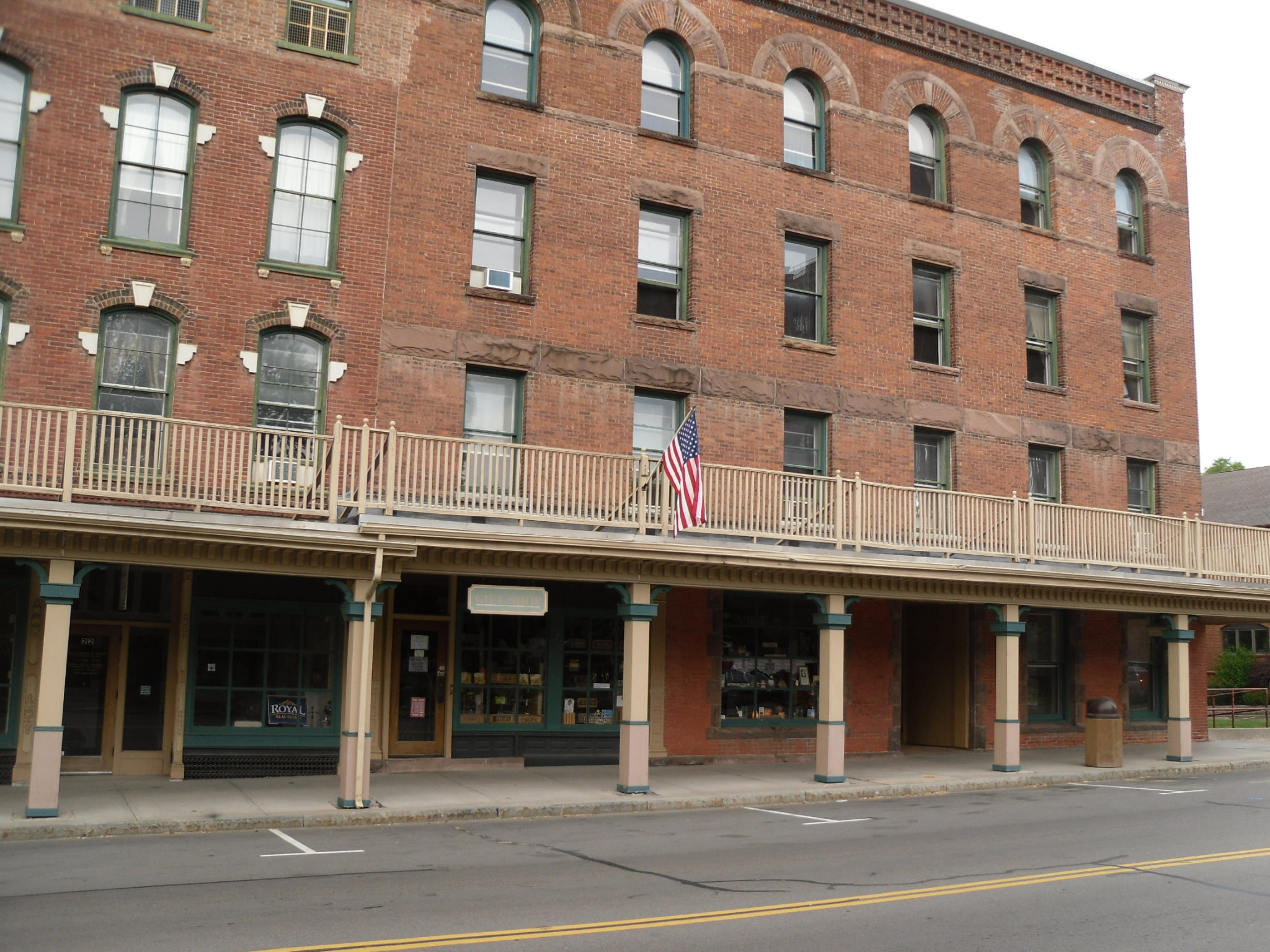
Foster Block, May 2010
