= Philetus Swift House =

Historic house in New York, United States

- U.S. National Register of Historic Places
- Location within New York Location within the United States
- Location: 866 NY 96, Phelps, New York
- Coordinates: 42°56′56″N 77°1′6″W
- Area: 41.4 acres (16.8 ha)
- Built: 1792
- Architectural style: Federal
- NRHP reference No.: 05000159
- Added to NRHP: March 15, 2005

Philetus Swift House is a historic home located at Phelps in Ontario County, New York. The limestone dwelling was built in two stages between 1792 and 1816. It is distinguished by a 2½-story, three-bay side-hall Federal-style main block (1816) and 2-story side ell (1792). Also on the property are two contributing barns.

It was listed on the National Register of Historic Places in 2005.
