= Clifton Springs Sanitarium =

Historic commercial building in New York, United States

- U.S. National Register of Historic Places
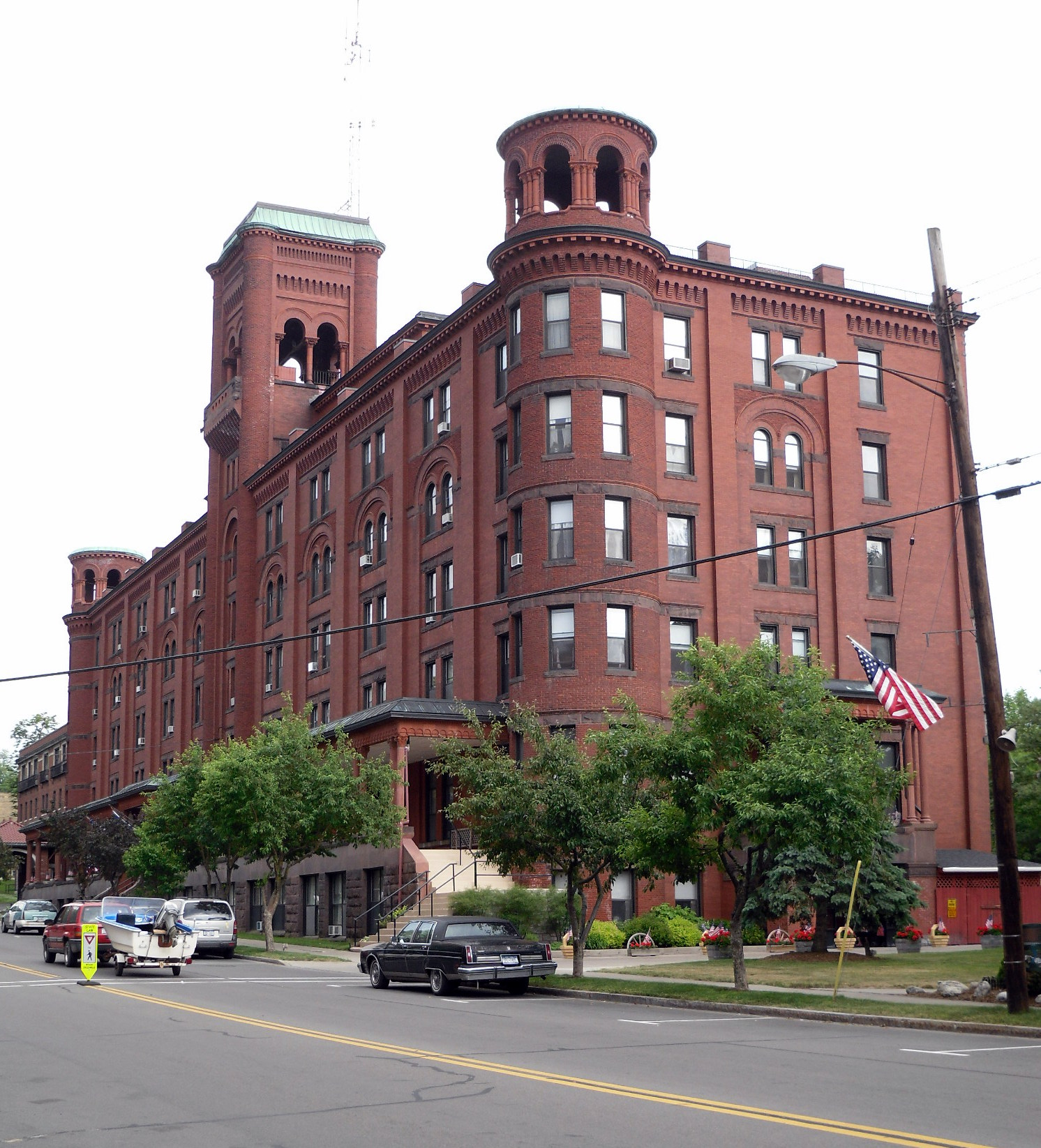
- Clifton Springs Sanitarium, May 2010

- Location within New York Location within the United States
- Location: 11 and 9 E. Main St, Clifton Springs, New York
- Coordinates: 42°57′40″N 77°8′14″W
- Area: 2.1 acres (0.85 ha)
- Built: 1892
- Architect: Pierce & Bickford
- Architectural style: Romanesque, Gothic Revival, Richardsonian Romanesque
- NRHP reference No.: 79001615
- Added to NRHP: April 06, 1979

Clifton Springs Sanitarium is a historic sanitarium building located at the village of Clifton Springs in Ontario County, New York. Construction of the sanitarium building began in 1892 as a five-story ell-shaped 244-foot-long (74 m) brick structure in the Richardsonian Romanesque style. The facade is eleven bays wide and terminated at each end by a conical tower with flat roof. A rectangular tower dominates the central bay. The building includes a chapel that has a favrile glass mosaic of the Last Supper designed by Louis Comfort Tiffany. It was home to the Clifton Springs Water Cure promoted by Dr. Henry Foster, whose 1854 home, Foster Cottage, is located on the property. In 1974 it was converted to a senior citizens apartment building. The sanitarium building and Foster Cottage were later included as part of the Clifton Springs Sanitarium Historic District.

The spa building "is a fine example of the early work of the Elmira architectural firm of Pierce & Bickford which was active in the western part of New York State from 1890 to 1930."

It was listed on the National Register of Historic Places in 1979.

== Notable people ==
- Dr. Cordelia A. Greene

== Gallery ==
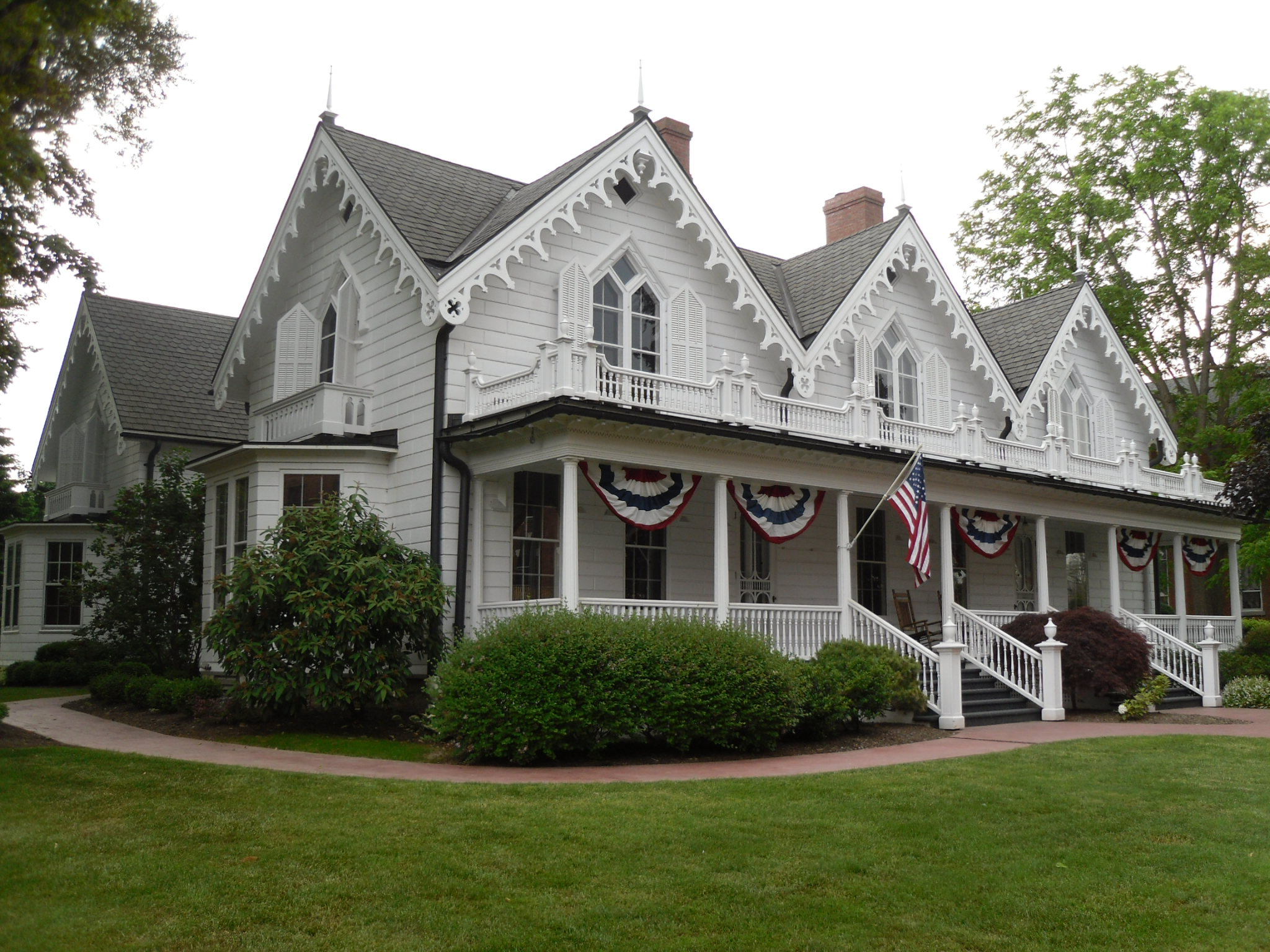
Foster Cottage, May 10
