= Schodack Center, New York =

- hamlet
- Location within New York
- Coordinates: 42°33′16″N 73°40′35″W
- Country: United States
- State: New York
- County: Rensselaer
- Town: Schodack
- Elevation: 299 ft (91 m)
- Time zone: UTC-5 (Eastern (EST))
  - Summer (DST): UTC-4 (EDT)
- Area code: 518
- GNIS feature ID: 964591

Schodack Center is a hamlet in the town of Schodack, Rensselaer County, New York, United States. Schodack Center is at the junction of Interstate 90, U.S. Route 20 and U.S. Route 9.
