= William Huffman Cobblestone House =

Historic house in New York, United States

- U.S. National Register of Historic Places
- Location within New York Location within the United States
- Location: 1064 Townline Rd., Phelps, New York
- Coordinates: 42°59′4″N 76°58′6″W
- Area: 108.7 acres (44.0 ha)
- Built: 1845
- Architectural style: Greek Revival
- MPS: Cobblestone Architecture of New York State MPS
- NRHP reference No.: 02001647
- Added to NRHP: December 31, 2002

William Huffman Cobblestone House is a historic home located at Phelps in Ontario County, New York. It was constructed in 1845 and is a distinct example of the late Federal / early Greek Revival style, cobblestone domestic architecture. The house consists of a two-story, three bay main block with a one-story side ell. The exterior walls are built of evenly shaped and colored field cobbles. It is one of approximately 101 cobblestone buildings in Ontario County and 26 in the village and town of Phelps. Also on the property is a late 19th-century barn.

It was listed on the National Register of Historic Places in 2002.
