= Port Gibson United Methodist Church =

Historic church in New York, United States

- U.S. National Register of Historic Places
- Location within New York Location within the United States
- Location: 2951 Greig St., Port Gibson, New York
- Coordinates: 43°2′13″N 77°9′23″W
- Area: less than one acre
- Built: 1871
- Architectural style: Romanesque
- NRHP reference No.: 96001387
- Added to NRHP: November 29, 1996

Port Gibson United Methodist Church is a historic United Methodist church located at Port Gibson in Ontario County, New York. The church was constructed in 1871 and is an imposing example of Romanesque Revival style. The front facade features a square, frame bell tower surmounted by a soaring, slate clad octagonal spire.

It was listed on the National Register of Historic Places in 1996.
