= Phelps, New York =

Phelps
- Town
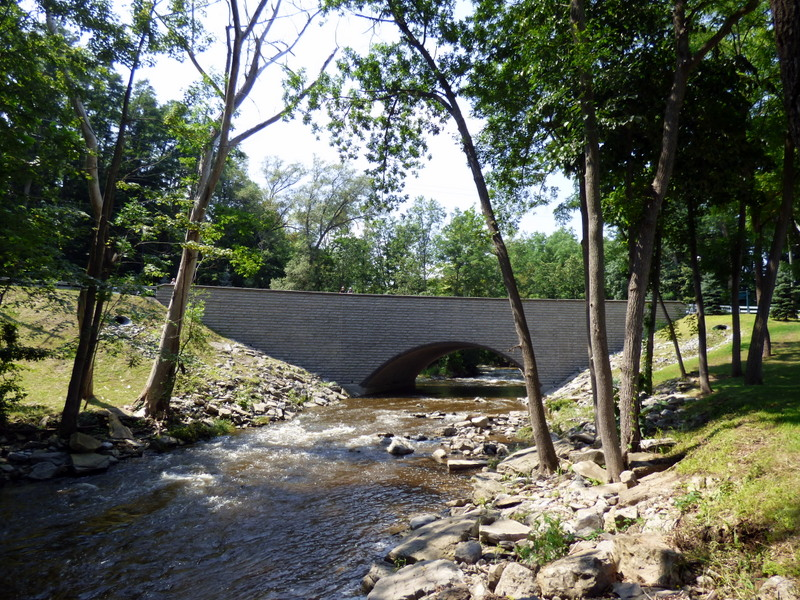
- Crooked Bridge Park

- Location of New York in the United States
- Coordinates: 42.957553°N 77.058073°W
- Country: United States
- State: New York
- County: Ontario

Government
  - Town Supervisor: William Wellman Town Council: Kent Ridley; Ronald Allen; Brent Ford; John Duchesneau

Area
  - Total: 65.24 sq mi (168.98 km^{2})
  - Land: 64.95 sq mi (168.22 km^{2})
  - Water: 0.29 sq mi (0.76 km^{2})

Population (2020)
  - Total: 6,637
  - Density: 106/sq mi (41.1/km^{2})
- Time zone: EST
  - Summer (DST): EDT
- FIPS code: 36-069-57529
- Website: https://www.phelpsny.com/

Phelps is a town in Ontario County, New York, United States. The population was 6,637 at the 2020 census. The Town of Phelps contains a village called Phelps. Both are north of Geneva.

== History ==
The town was part of the Phelps and Gorham Purchase. The region was first settled around 1788. The town was formed in 1796 and was formerly known as "Sullivan." The town of Phelps is named after one of the original proprietors. The community was incorporated in 1855.

== Geography ==
According to the United States Census Bureau, the town has a total area of 65.3 square miles (169.0 km^{2}), of which 65.0 square miles (168.3 km^{2}) is land and 0.3 square mile (0.7 km^{2}) (0.43%) is water.

The eastern town line is the border of Seneca County and the northern town line is the border of Wayne County.

== Demographics ==
Historical population
Census	Pop.	Note	%±
1820	5,688		—
1830	4,798		−15.6%
1840	5,563		15.9%
1850	5,542		−0.4%
1860	5,586		0.8%
1870	5,130		−8.2%
1880	5,189		1.2%
1890	5,086		−2.0%
1900	4,788		−5.9%
1910	4,733		−1.1%
1920	4,205		−11.2%
1930	4,590		9.2%
1940	4,425		−3.6%
1950	4,890		10.5%
1960	5,825		19.1%
1970	6,330		8.7%
1980	6,522		3.0%
1990	6,749		3.5%
2000	7,017		4.0%
2010	7,072		0.8%
2020	6,637		−6.2%
U.S. Decennial Census

As of the census of 2020, there were 6,637 people, 2,659 households, and 1,957 families residing in the town. The population density was 108.0 inhabitants per square mile (41.7/km^{2}). There were 2,817 housing units at an average density of 43.4 per square mile (16.8/km^{2}). The racial makeup of the town was 98.09% White, 0.26% Black or African American, 0.14% Native American, 0.27% Asian, 0.46% from other races, and 0.78% from two or more races. Hispanic or Latino of any race were 1.23% of the population.

There were 2,659 households, out of which 34.9% had children under the age of 18 living with them, 60.6% were married couples living together, 8.6% had a female householder with no husband present, and 26.4% were non-families. 20.8% of all households were made up of individuals, and 8.8% had someone living alone who was 65 years of age or older. The average household size was 2.63 and the average family size was 3.03.

In the town, the population was spread out, with 27.1% under the age of 18, 6.3% from 18 to 24, 29.9% from 25 to 44, 25.1% from 45 to 64, and 11.6% who were 65 years of age or older. The median age was 38 years. For every 100 females, there were 97.7 males. For every 100 females age 18 and over, there were 94.3 males.

The median income for a household in the town was $47,246, and the median income for a family was $53,854. Males had a median income of $34,792 versus $26,498 for females. The per capita income for the town was $21,297. About 3.0% of families and 4.3% of the population were below the poverty line, including 4.8% of those under age 18 and 5.8% of those age 65 or over.

== Arts and culture ==
=== Annual cultural events ===
The town of Phelps was formerly a major center for the production of sauerkraut, earning the distinction of sauerkraut capital of the world. The town holds a sauerkraut-themed festival every year during the first weekend of August. 2020 would have been the festival's 54th anniversary, if not for COVID-19.

=== Museums and other points of interest ===
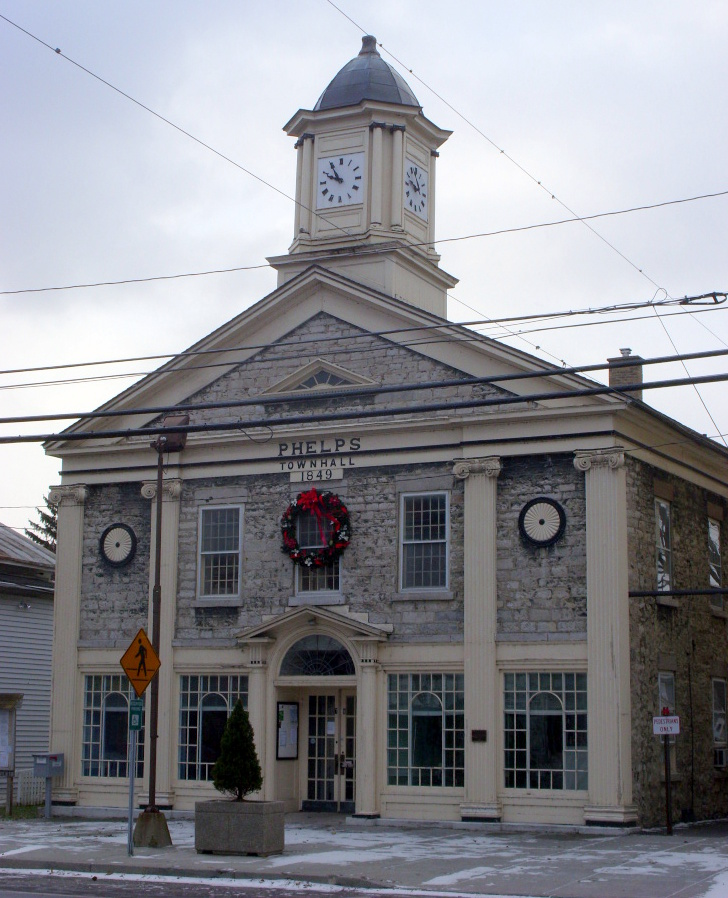
Phelps Town Hall

The Phelps Community Historical Society and Howe House Museum . The First Baptist Church of Phelps, Harmon Cobblestone Farmhouse and Cobblestone Smokehouse, Dr. John Quincy Howe House, Phelps Town Hall, William Huffman Cobblestone House, St. John's Episcopal Church and Philetus Swift House are listed on the National Register of Historic Places.

=== Transportation ===
The New York State Thruway (Interstate 90) passes through the town north of Phelps village and Clifton Springs. New York State Route 96 parallels the Thruway and intersects two north–south highways in the western part of the town: New York State Route 88 and New York State Route 488.

== Notable people ==
- Joe Gleason, former MLB pitcher
- Paul D. MacLean (1913–2007), neuroscientist, born in Phelps
- Bellamy Partridge, author of Country Lawyer, a bestselling biography of his father who had practiced in Phelps
- Charles C. Stevenson, fifth governor of Nevada; born in Phelps

== Communities and locations in the Town of Phelps ==
- Clifton Springs – The smaller, and eastern, part of the Village of Clifton Springs is located by the west town line.
- Dobbins Corners – A hamlet on the east town line
- East X – A location near the east town line, west of Dobbins Corners
- Five Points – A location near the east town line, south of West Junius
- Five Waters Corners – A location on NY-88 in the northern part of the town
- Fort Hill – A hamlet in the south part of the town
- Gypsum – A hamlet at the western town line on County Road 27
- Knickerbocker Corner – A hamlet west of Phelps village at the junction of NY-96 and NY-488
- Melvin Hill – A hamlet in the south part of the town
- Oaks Corners – A hamlet in the southeast part of the town on County Road 23. It is named after Pioneer Jonathan Oaks
- Orleans – A hamlet in the southwest part of the town on NY-488
- Phelps – The Village of Phelps is on NY-96 near the center of the town
- Phelps Junction – A hamlet northwest of Phelps village
- Pierson Corners – A location by the south town line
- Thompson – A hamlet on the east town line, north of West Junius
- Unionville – A hamlet on NY-96 east of Phelps village
- Warner Corners – A location east of Orleans on County Road 23
- West Junius – A hamlet near the east town line
