= Westgate Plaza (Albany, New York) =

Strip mall in Albany, New York

Coordinates: 42°40′56.5″N 73°47′25.5″W

Westgate Plaza is a large strip mall in the city of Albany, New York, located on Central Avenue. Westgate is considered the first mall in the Albany area, and opened in 1957.

== Redevelopment ==
Plans were submitted to the city of Albany before February 23, 1993 for redevelopment of parts of the plaza. This would include demolishing the section that included the closed Grand Union and Woolworth's stores, as well as the still open Wheels and Paper Cutter stores, with plans to relocate the latter stores. A new section would be built on space occupied by the section to be demolished.

By October 26, 1993, the redevelopment plans had been approved by the city of Albany.

== Ownership/Property Management ==
As of February 23, 1993, the plaza was owned by Russell Road Associates of Boston. On that date, the plaza was only 40% full and the owners were bankrupt.

Nigro Cos. was managing the shopping center in October, 1993.

Price Chopper purchased 2 acres (8,100 m^{2}) from owner Russell Road Associates in 1993 at a cost of $3 million. This purchase allowed Russell Road Associates, bankrupt at the time, to jumpstart their reorganization. Price Chopper built an 82,500-square-foot (7,660 m^{2}) store on the land for approximately $4 million. The building was sold to Mesirow-Heller and Price Chopper leased the building until they moved to the former ShopRite down the street in 2024 reopening as Market 32. In early 1997, Ruskin Investors of Northbrook, Illinois purchased the building from Mesirow-Heller for $9 million. Lease terms did not change as a result of the purchase.

Boston Development Associates of Westwood, Massachusetts, became the manager of the plaza property in January, 1997.

== Historic Sign ==
The sign for Westgate Plaza is unofficially considered a landmark for the uptown Central Avenue area. There have been concerns about damage or renovation of the sign as removing a piece of history for the area.

== Miscellaneous Notes ==
By 1994, it was noted that Crossgates Mall, which had been open for ten years by that time, had had a negative effect on older city shopping plazas such as Westgate.
