= Manchester (village), New York =

Manchester, New York
- Village
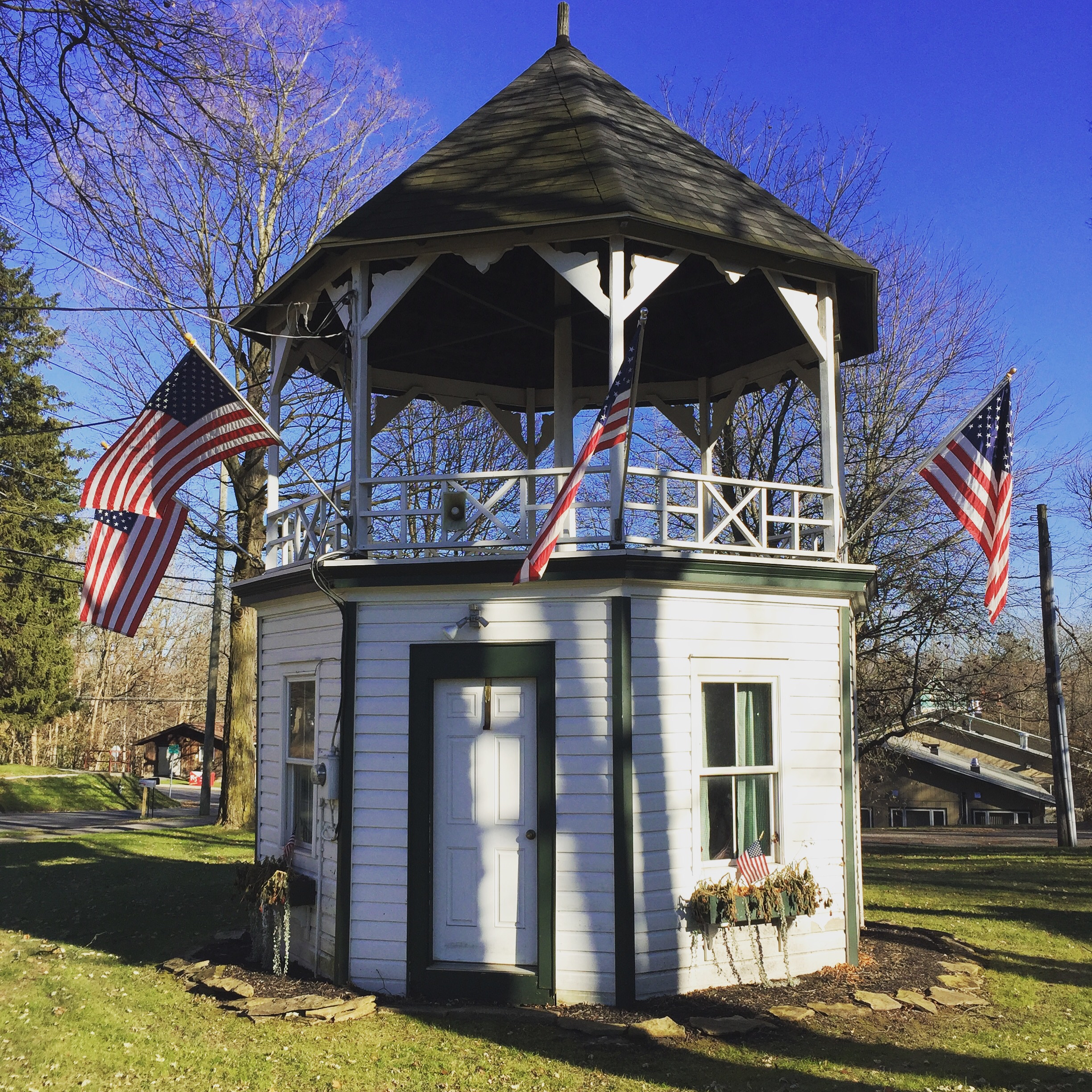
- Bandstand in the center of the village

- Location within the state of New York
- Coordinates: 42°58′10″N 77°13′34″W
- Country: United States
- State: New York
- County: Ontario

Area
  - Total: 1.14 sq mi (2.96 km^{2})
  - Land: 1.14 sq mi (2.96 km^{2})
  - Water: 0 sq mi (0.00 km^{2})
- Elevation: 590 ft (180 m)

Population (2020)
  - Total: 1,640
  - Density: 1,437.2/sq mi (554.91/km^{2})
- Time zone: UTC-5 (Eastern (EST))
  - Summer (DST): UTC-4 (EDT)
- ZIP code: 14504
- Area code: 585
- FIPS code: 36-44853
- GNIS feature ID: 0956335
- Website: www.villageofmanchester.org

Manchester is a village located within the Town of Manchester in Ontario County, New York, United States. The population was 1,709 at the 2010 census. The village was named after Manchester in England.

The Village of Manchester is located in the southwest part of the town, north of Canandaigua.

(The area and population reported and analyzed in this article are also included in the aggregate values for the town as a whole. See: Manchester (town), New York. )

== History ==
The future village was the first settlement in the Town, in 1793. The community was originally called "Coonsville," after one of its early settlers, Valentine Coon, but when manufacturing became important, the name was changed to "Manchester." The village was incorporated in 1892.

== Geography ==
According to the United States Census Bureau, the village has a total area of 1.2 square miles (3.0 km^{2}), all land.

New York State Route 21 passes through the village, which is located immediately south of the New York State Thruway (exit 43) and New York State Route 96.

== Demographics ==
Historical population
Census	Pop.	Note	%±
1880	329		—
1900	711		—
1910	881		23.9%
1920	1,418		61.0%
1930	1,429		0.8%
1940	1,330		−6.9%
1950	1,262		−5.1%
1960	1,344		6.5%
1970	1,305		−2.9%
1980	1,698		30.1%
1990	1,598		−5.9%
2000	1,475		−7.7%
2010	1,709		15.9%
2020	1,640		−4.0%
U.S. Decennial Census

As of the census of 2000, there were 1,475 people, 648 households, and 395 families residing in the village. The population density was 1,259.8 inhabitants per square mile (486.4/km^{2}). There were 688 housing units at an average density of 227.0 persons/km^{2} (587.6 persons/sq mi). The racial makeup of the village was 97.56% White, 0.41% African American, 0.34% Native American, 0.20% Asian, 0.00% Pacific Islander, 0.20% from other races, and 1.29% from two or more races. 1.15% of the population were Hispanic or Latino of any race.

There were 648 households, out of which 23.9% had children under the age of 18 living with them, 47.7% were married couples living together, 9.1% have a woman whose husband does not live with her, and 38.9% were non-families. 31.3% of all households were made up of individuals, and 18.7% had someone living alone who was 65 years of age or older. The average household size was 2.28 and the average family size was 2.84.

In the village, the population was spread out, with 21.9% under the age of 18, 6.1% from 18 to 24, 25.2% from 25 to 44, 23.1% from 45 to 64, and 23.7% who were 65 years of age or older. The median age was 43 years. For every 100 females, there were 97.7 males. For every 100 females age 18 and over, there were 89.5 males.

The median income for a household in the village was $36,146, and the median income for a family was $44,625. Males had a median income of $31,792 versus $25,156 for females. The per capita income for the village was $17,956. 7.2% of the population and 3.0% of families were below the poverty line. Out of the total people living in poverty, 11.9% are under the age of 18 and 3.5% are 65 or older.
