= New York State Route 297 =

State highway in Onondaga County, New York, US

New York State Route 297
- NY 297 highlighted in red

Route information
- Maintained by NYSDOT, Onondaga County and the village of Solvay
- Length: 2.33 mi (3.75 km)
- Existed: late 1950s–present

Major junctions
- South end: NY 173 in Camillus
- North end: I-690 in Geddes

Location
- Country: United States
- State: New York
- Counties: Onondaga

Highway system
- New York Highways; Interstate; US; State; Reference; Parkways
← NY 296	→ NY 298

New York State Route 297 (NY 297) is a state highway in the western suburbs of Syracuse, New York, in the United States. It is signed as north–south; however, it follows more of a southwest–northeast alignment for 2.33 miles (3.75 km) through the towns of Camillus and Geddes. The southern terminus of the route is at an intersection with NY 173 in a section of Camillus known as Fairmount. Its northern terminus is at a junction with State Fair Boulevard in Geddes, where NY 297 connects to Interstate 690 (I-690) exit 7. NY 297 passes through the northern portion of the village of Solvay and runs adjacent to the New York State Fairgrounds north of Solvay. The route was assigned in the late 1950s.

== Route description ==
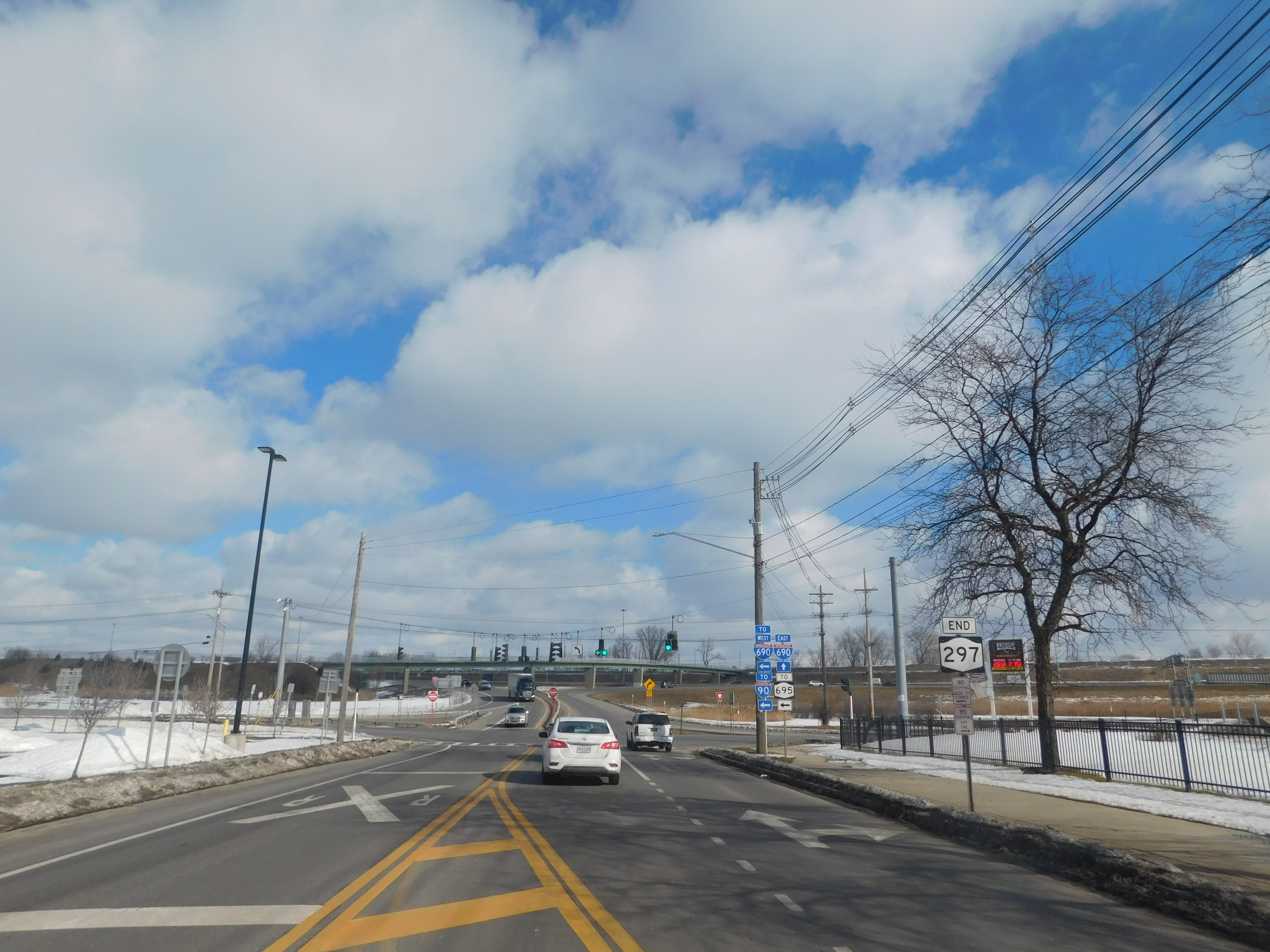
Approaching State Fair Boulevard on NY 297 northbound. The New York State Fairgrounds are located adjacent to the intersection.

NY 297 begins at an intersection with NY 173 in Fairmount, a neighborhood within the town of Camillus. It heads to the northeast as the two-lane Milton Avenue, running alongside the main line of the Finger Lakes Railway and serving several commercial buildings in an otherwise residential area. After one-half mile (0.8 km), the route passes under NY 5, here a limited-access highway. There is no connection between NY 297 and NY 5; however, NY 297 does connect to nearby NY 695 by way of Horan Road, a local street just north of the NY 5 overpasses. The route continues northeastward into the town of Geddes and the village of Solvay, where it passes by a mixture of homes and businesses as it slowly turns to the east. The highway continues to follow Milton Avenue along the northern fringe of the village to a junction with Bridge Street.

At this point, the route turns to the north, following Bridge Street as it begins to slowly head downhill from the village. NY 297 immediately crosses the Finger Lakes Railway at-grade before leveling off as it leaves the village limits. The road soon rises again, however, climbing in elevation to cross the CSX Transportation-owned Mohawk Subdivision by way of a long, high bridge that curves to the northeast while crossing the tracks. On the other side of the structure, the route descends one final time, heading generally northeastward along the eastern edge of the New York State Fairgrounds and the western edge of a pair of large industrial plants. NY 297 crosses CSX's Fairgrounds Subdivision line at-grade in its final few yards before ending at an intersection with State Fair Boulevard (NY 931B) at the northeastern tip of the fairgrounds in Geddes. The right-of-way of the route continues on for a short distance, connecting NY 297 to I-690 eastbound by way of exit 7. Access to I-690 westbound by way of State Fair Boulevard (NY 931B) west to I-690 exit 6.

Maintenance of NY 297 is split between Onondaga County, the village of Solvay, and the New York State Department of Transportation (NYSDOT). From NY 173 to the Solvay village line, NY 297 is co-designated, but not signed, as part of County Route 63. The section of the route in Solvay between the village line and Bridge Street is locally maintained, while the remainder of NY 297 is maintained by the state.

== History ==
The portion of Bridge Street between Milton Avenue in Solvay and State Fair Boulevard in Geddes had been a state highway since 1917; however, it was not assigned a signed designation for roughly 40 years. In the late 1950s, Bridge Street became part of the new NY 297, a highway beginning at NY 173 in Fairmount and ending at State Fair Boulevard (then part of NY 48). The bridge carrying NY 297 (Bridge Street) over the CSX Transportation-owned Mohawk Subdivision in Geddes was replaced in 1977. Portions of the bridge deck and abutments were rehabilitated by NYSDOT in 2006. Only one lane was open to traffic during the summer-long project; however, two-way traffic was maintained through the use of temporary traffic signals.

== Major intersections ==
The entire route is in Onondaga County.

Location	mi	km	Destinations	Notes
Town of Camillus	0.00	0.00	NY 173 (Onondaga Road)	Southern terminus; neighborhood of Fairmount
Geddes	2.33	3.75	I-690 east – Syracuse / To I-690 west / I-90 / NY 695 via State Fair Boulevard ( NY 931B) – Lakeland, Fairgrounds	Northern terminus; exit 11-12B (I-690); eastern terminus of unsigned NY 931B
1.000 mi = 1.609 km; 1.000 km = 0.621 mi
