= Interstate 690 =

Highway in New York

Interstate 690
- Map of Syracuse, New York, with I-690 highlighted in red

Route information
- Auxiliary route of I-90
- Maintained by NYSDOT
- Length: 14.19 mi (22.84 km)
- Existed: early 1960s–present
- NHS: Entire route

Major junctions
- West end: I-90 Toll / New York Thruway / NY 690 in Van Buren
- NY 695 in Geddes; NY 298 in Syracuse; I-81 BL / US 11 / NY 5 in Syracuse
- East end: I-81 in DeWitt

Location
- Country: United States
- State: New York
- Counties: Onondaga

Highway system
- Interstate Highway System; Main; Auxiliary; Suffixed; Business; Future; New York Highways; Interstate; US; State; Reference; Parkways
← I-687	→ NY 690

Interstate 690 (I-690) is an auxiliary Interstate Highway that extends for 14.19 miles (22.84 km) through the vicinity of Syracuse, New York, in the United States. It is a spur of I-90 (here part of the New York State Thruway) that travels southeast from Thruway exit 39 in Van Buren to I-81 (former I-481) in DeWitt. In between, I-690 passes through the western suburbs of Syracuse before heading east through the city itself, where it meets I-81 Business (former I-81) in Downtown Syracuse. The freeway continues northwest of the thruway as New York State Route 690 (NY 690).

== Route description ==
I-690 begins at a double trumpet interchange with the New York State Thruway (I-90) in the town of Van Buren. The six-lane, fully-shouldered limited-access highway continues north toward Baldwinsville as NY 690 while I-690 travels east from the junction. The interchange with the thruway is labeled as exit 6. Additionally, NY 690 is signed north–south while I-690 is signed east–west. Before physically crossing I-90, it features a partial interchange with John Glenn Boulevard exit 8 and turns southeast.

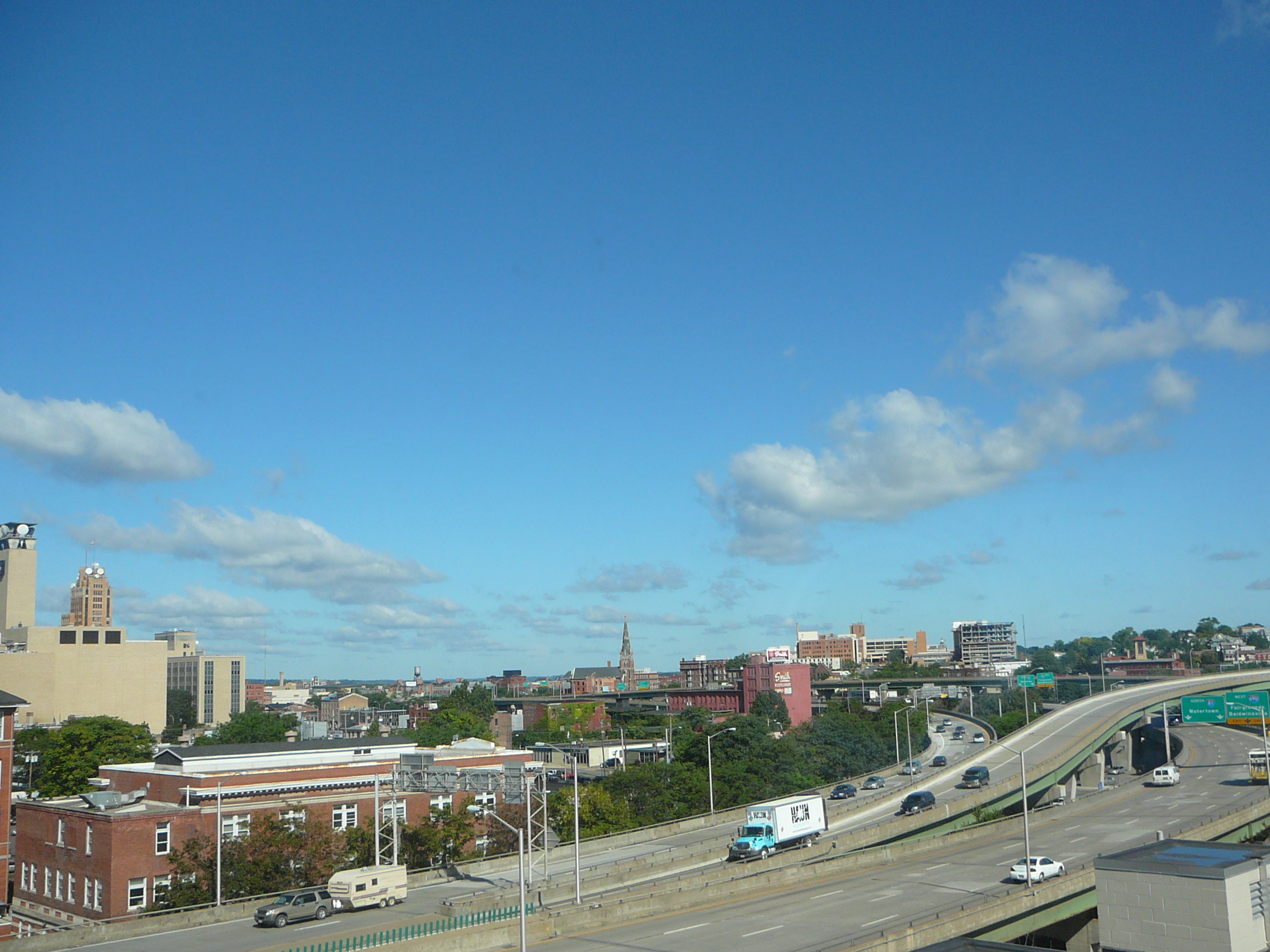
I-81 at I-690 in Downtown Syracuse

After crossing and connecting with State Fair Boulevard at exit 9, I-690 runs along the western shore of Onondaga Lake, passing under many pedestrian bridges. The highway serves the New York State Fairgrounds by way of exits 10 & 11 eastbound, and 12A-B westbound, with exits 10 & 12A creating a large directional T interchange with NY 695. Within this interchange was a signalized, at-grade intersection that connected I-690 to a parking area. For 12 days each year, the light was used to allow buses to carry New York State Fair attendees from the parking area across the road to the fair. I-690 was one of only a few Interstate Highways to feature a traffic light. Construction began in 2019 and finished in 2020 of a bridge overpass to this parking area, eliminating the need for a traffic signal.

The freeway continues along the shore and bears toward the downtown area, where the shoulders frequently disappear and the buildings are often situated close to the freeway. It passes over a railroad grade and Hiawatha Boulevard exit 13, before meeting NY 298 (Bear Street) at exit 14. In the interchange with West Street and NY 5 (West Genesee Street) one mile (1.6 km) to the east, two lanes of I-690 disappear, and I-81 follows directly after in the center of the city with an incomplete interchange. There is no direct freeway ramp from I-690 east to I-81 BL north and I-81 BL south to I-690 west. NY 298, which connects to I-81 BL at exit 5A west of the I-81 BL/I-690 interchange, must be used to make these connections.

I-690 rewidens to six lanes as it proceeds eastward out of Downtown Syracuse. Two miles (3.2 km) from downtown, it connects to both Teall Avenue by way of exit 17, and Burnet and Midler avenues by way of exit 18. The latter is designated as NY 598; however, it is not signed as such from I-690. After a curve to the southeast, NY 635 meets the route at a cloverleaf interchange exits 19A-B, utilizing collector–distributor roads to do so. The collector–distributor roads continue to a partial cloverleaf interchange (parclo) with Bridge Street exit 19C, where they end. Shortly after this interchange, I-690 terminates at I-81.

== History ==
The portion of the modern I-690 corridor west of Downtown Syracuse was originally served by NY 48, a route assigned as part of the 1930 renumbering of state highways in New York. NY 48 followed the length of State Fair Boulevard from Van Buren to Downtown Syracuse, where it followed several local streets to reach NY 5. In the early 1960s, work began on a new freeway extending from the New York State Thruway to Syracuse by way of the western shoreline of Onondaga Lake. The new road, designated as I-690, was completed from the thruway to NY 298 by 1962. I-690 supplanted State Fair Boulevard as the primary highway through the area, and, from NY 297 southeast, State Fair Boulevard was upgraded on the spot. As a result, NY 48 was truncated to its current southern terminus in Van Buren.

The section of I-690 near the New York State Fairgrounds was originally a surface highway. When I-690 was extended eastward through downtown to Midler Avenue (now NY 598) in the mid-1960s, I-690 was moved onto its current, limited-access routing. State Fair Boulevard runs on the former I-690 eastbound right-of-way, while a service road occupies the westbound right of way. State Fair Boulevard continues east along this right-of-way onto a ramp to I-690. The section of I-690 between Midler Avenue and I-81 (former I-481) was completed in the early 1970s. I-690 gained a mile (1.6 km) when its western terminus was relocated in 1987. The interchange with the thruway was relocated and completely rebuilt, forcing a complete renumbering of all the exits on the highway.

I-690 follows the former New York Central Railroad (NYC) roadbed through a portion of Downtown Syracuse and actually cuts through the site of the former Syracuse station. A remnant of the former railroad station platforms is visible to the north of the freeway, with plaster statues of people waiting for trains, who are occasionally dressed up for winter by area residents with scarves and other winter apparel. Time Warner Cable, which restored the building as the base of its Central New York operations and Spectrum News 1 Central New York, also has a rail-focussed mural along the back of that building fronting I-690.

In mid-2009, the New York State Department of Transportation posted new mile markers on both NY 690 and I-690, and in mid-2025, NY 690 received exit numbers. The mileposts and exit numbers now treat the entire length of both routes as a single entity, with mile 0 being at the northern terminus of NY 690 at NY 48 and mile 20 being near the eastern terminus of I-690 at I-481.

There have been plans for decades to extend I-690 eastward from I-81 (former I-481) to Manlius or to the far east suburb of Chittenango; however, these plans have yet to become a reality. Several unused ramps exist at the interchange between I-81 and I-690, intended to connect to an extended I-690.

== Future ==
As part of the community grid solution for I-81 in downtown Syracuse, a 1.5-mile (2.4 km) section of I-690 around the intersection with BL 81 will be rebuilt. Bridges along this section will be replaced, and the rebuilt highway will feature wider lanes and bigger shoulders, and realign to southerly (further south of the former New York Central Railroad station track area). The state is also proposing the elimination of exit 16B (Townsend Street, old Exit 13), the restructuring of exits 15 (West Street, old Exit 11) and 15B (West Genesee Street, old Exit 12), and the addition of an exit at Crouse Avenue (eastbound entrance ramp opened November 25th, 2025, Westbound exit ramp to open mid-2026) and Irving Avenue to provide better access to Syracuse University. Construction along I-690 is part of Phase Two of the community grid project, which would take approximately three years. The entire project is expected to start mid-2020 and take five years. Also, the existing exit numbers along I-690 will be renumbered to reflect the mile-based exit numbers.

== Exit list ==
In 2025, NYSDOT is renumbering the exit numbers along I-690. The entire route is in Onondaga County.

Location	mi	km	Old exit	New exit	Destinations	Notes
Van Buren	0.00	0.00	–	–	NY 690 north – Baldwinsville	Continuation north
Van Buren	0.00	0.00	1	6	I-90 Toll / New York Thruway – Albany, Buffalo	Exit 39 on I-90 / Thruway
Van Buren	0.31	0.50	2	7 (EB); 7A (WB)	Jones Road	
Van Buren	0.89	1.43	3	7B	NY 48 north (Farrell Road)	Westbound exit and entrance; southern terminus of NY 48
Geddes	1.11	1.79	4	8	John Glenn Boulevard	Western terminus of John Glenn Boulevard; to NY 370
Geddes	2.05	3.30	5	9	State Fair Boulevard (CR 80 east) – Lakeland	
Geddes	4.55	7.32	6	10 (EB); 12A (WB)	NY 695 south to NY 5 – Lakeland, Auburn	Northern terminus of NY 695; Lakeland not signed westbound
Geddes	5.28	8.50	7	11 (EB); 12B (WB)	NY 297 south – Amphitheater, Fairgrounds, Solvay	Northern terminus of NY 297; Amphitheater not signed eastbound
Syracuse	7.14	11.49	8	13	Hiawatha Boulevard	Eastbound exit and westbound entrance; access to Destiny USA
Syracuse	7.43	11.96	9 (EB); 10 (WB)	14	NY 298 north (Bear Street) to I-81 BL north	Eastbound exit and westbound entrance; southern terminus of NY 298
Syracuse	7.75	12.47	9 (EB); 10 (WB)	14	North Geddes Street	Westbound exit and eastbound entrance
Syracuse	8.22	13.23	11	15 (EB); 15A (WB)	West Street	Westbound exit closed indefinitely and being redesigned as part of the I-81 viaduct project
Syracuse	8.39	13.50	12	15B	West Genesee Street (NY 5) – Downtown Syracuse	Eastbound exit only
Syracuse	9.00	14.48	–	–	I-81 BL – Binghamton, Watertown	No eastbound exit to BL I-81 north, no westbound entrance from BL I-81 south. Westbound exit to BL I-81 South to permanently close early 2027
Syracuse	9.29	14.95	13	16B	Townsend Street – Downtown Syracuse	Westbound exit only; access to Oncenter and Syracuse University
Syracuse	9.50	15.29	–	16	Irving Avenue	Future eastbound exit and westbound entrance; construction scheduled to start early 2027
Syracuse	9.65	15.53	–	16	North Crouse Avenue	Eastbound entrance only, westbound exit currently under construction; expected completion late 2026
Syracuse	10.32	16.61	14	17	Teall Avenue	
Syracuse	11.28	18.15	15	18	Midler Avenue (NY 598)	
Syracuse–East Syracuse line	12.34	19.86	16	19A-B	NY 635 (Thompson Road)	Signed as exits 19A (south) and 19B (north)
East Syracuse	13.19	21.23	17	19C	Bridge Street – East Syracuse	
DeWitt	14.19	22.84	–	–	I-81 to I-90 Toll / New York Thruway – Binghamton	Eastern terminus; exit 88 on I-81
1.000 mi = 1.609 km; 1.000 km = 0.621 mi: Electronic toll collection; Incomplete access; Unopened

== See also ==
- New York State Route 690 for exits along NY 690
