= New York State Route 695 =

State highway in Onondaga County, New York, US

New York State Route 695
- Map of Onondaga County in central New York with NY 695 highlighted in red

Route information
- Maintained by NYSDOT
- Length: 2.30 mi (3.70 km)
- Existed: early 1980s–present

Major junctions
- South end: NY 5 in Camillus
- North end: I-690 in Geddes

Location
- Country: United States
- State: New York
- Counties: Onondaga

Highway system
- New York Highways; Interstate; US; State; Reference; Parkways
| ← I-695 | → NY 747 |

New York State Route 695 (NY 695) is a 2.30-mile-long (3.70 km) freeway located west of Syracuse in the towns of Camillus and Geddes in Onondaga County, New York. The number of the highway was derived from the two highways that NY 695 links, Interstate 690 (I-690) and NY 5. The northern end of the highway passes by the New York State Fairgrounds.

NY 695 only has one exit, southbound only to Gerelock Road. The route also has one northbound only entrance from Milton Avenue (NY 297) via Horan Road.

== Route description ==
NY 695 begins at a directional T interchange with NY 5 north of the hamlet of Fairmount in the town of Camillus. The route heads north as a six-lane freeway, roughly paralleling the western limits of Syracuse, as it continues on through Camillus. Roughly 0.7 miles (1.1 km) from where NY 695 splits off of NY 5 east, a ramp from Horan Road, a local road that runs alongside NY 695 between Fairmount and Gere Lock Road, merges with NY 695 northbound, providing access to the freeway from Milton Avenue (NY 297). NY 695 passes over Gere Lock Road 0.4 miles (0.6 km) later. There is no access between Gere Lock Road and the freeway on NY 695 northbound; southbound, there is a lone exit ramp leading to the local roadway.

Past Gere Lock Road, NY 695 turns northeast as it ascends to cross over the CSX Transportation-owned Mohawk Subdivision (here four tracks wide) by way of a large flyover 247.4 metres (812 ft) in length. The remainder of the route is situated on an embankment as it passes adjacent to the New York State Fairgrounds off to the east of the roadway. Near the northwestern edge of the fairgrounds, NY 695 terminates at a semi-directional T interchange with I-690 (exit 6).

== History ==
Construction on what is now NY 695 began in the early 1970s and was completed in the mid-1970s. The expressway was initially designated NY 930T, an unsigned reference route. It was redesignated as the signed NY 695 in the early 1980s.

== Exit list ==
The entire route is in Onondaga County. All exits are unnumbered.

| Location | mi | km | Destinations | Notes |
|---|---|---|---|---|
| Town of Camillus | 0.00 | 0.00 | NY 5 – Fairmount, Auburn | Southern terminus |
| Town of Camillus | | | Gerelock Road (CR 220) | Southbound exit and northbound entrance |
| Geddes | | | I-690 west to I-90 / New York Thruway – Baldwinsville | Northbound exit and southbound entrance; exit 10-12A on I-690 |
| Geddes | 2.30 | 3.70 | I-690 east – Fairgrounds, Syracuse | Northern terminus |
1.000 mi = 1.609 km; 1.000 km = 0.621 mi: Incomplete access
