= Empower Federal Credit Union Amphitheater =

Outdoor concert venue in Syracuse, U.S.

Coordinates: 43.0896126°N 76.2203909°W

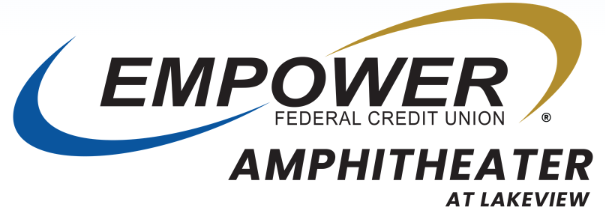

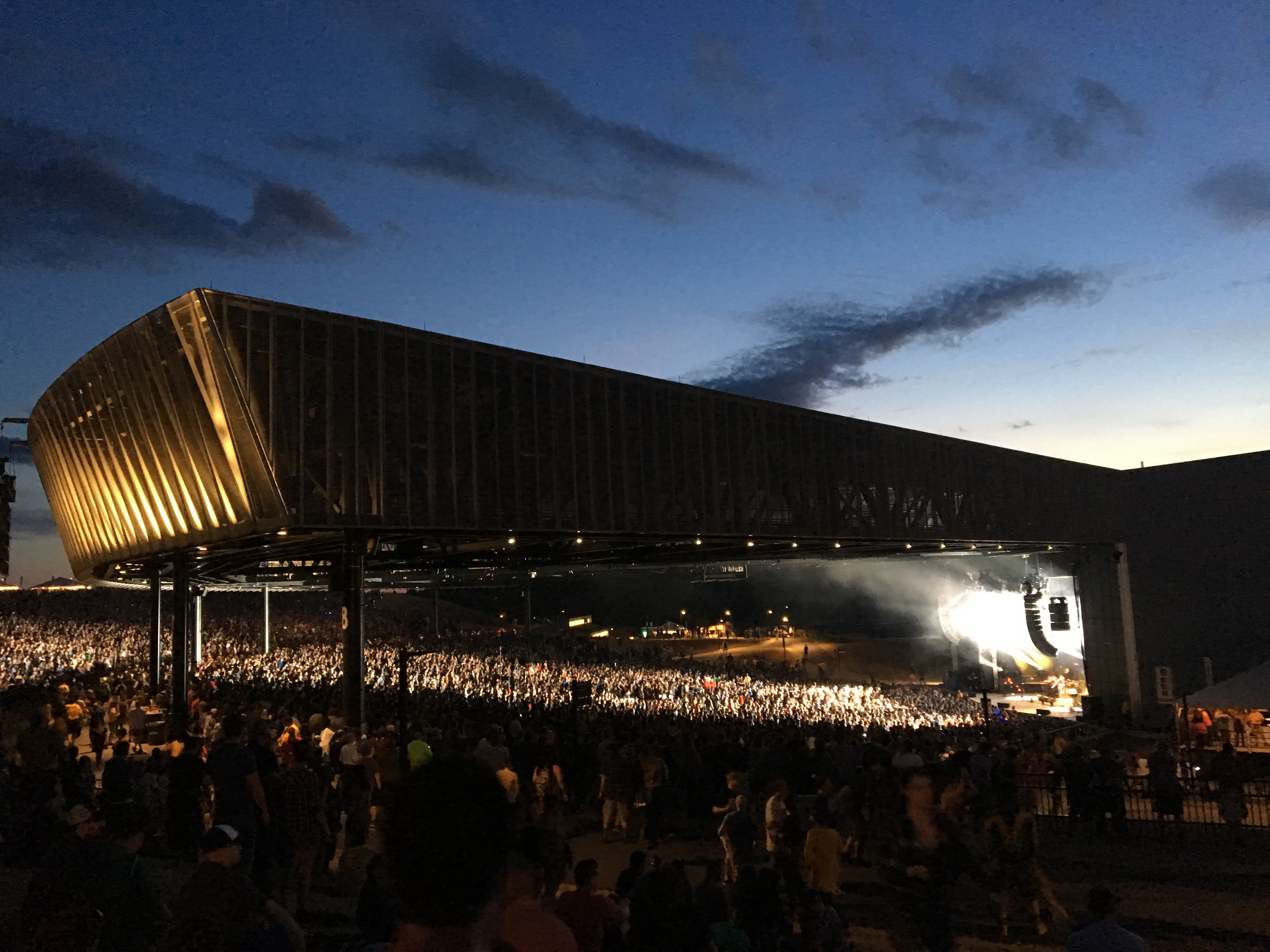
- Interactive map of Empower Federal Credit Union Amphitheater
- Full name: Empower Federal Credit Union Amphitheater at Lakeview
- Former names: Lakehouse Concert Pavilion Performance Arts Center (initial announcement); Onondaga Lake Amphitheater (planning/construction); Lakeview Amphitheater (2015-2018); St. Joseph's Health Amphitheater at Lakeview (2018-2023)
- Address: 490 Restoration Way, Syracuse, NY 13209-1047
- Location: Onondaga Lake, Geddes
- Owner: Onondaga County
- Operator: ASM Global; Live Nation
- Capacity: 17,500

Construction
- Groundbreaking: November 19, 2014
- Opened: September 3, 2015
- Cost: $49.3 million ($67 million in 2025 dollars)
- Architects: QPK Design; DLR Group
- Structural engineer: Cives Steel Company
- Services engineer: Northeast Contractors Inc.
- General contractor: Gilbane Building Company

Website
- Venue Website

The Empower Federal Credit Union Amphitheater at Lakeview (formerly known as the Lakeview Amphitheater and St. Joseph's Health Amphitheater at Lakeview) is an outdoor concert venue located on the shores of Onondaga Lake in the Town of Geddes, near the western edge of Syracuse, New York. It is an extension of the Empire Expo Center, home to the Great New York State Fair.

It replaced the aging Mohegan Sun Grandstand and is the main stage for concerts during the fair season. Empower Federal Credit Union Amphitheater holds 17,500 spectators - 5,000 seats under the pavilion and 12,500 lawn seats.

== History ==
Plans for an amphitheater, at the time named "Lakehouse Concert Pavilion Performance Arts Center," located on the shores Onondaga Lake were announced in January 2014 by then-New York State Governor Andrew Cuomo as part of phase one of the Onondaga Lake Revitilzation program. The land for the amphitheater was unused land already owned by Onondaga County, part of which is a former landfill. The venue aimed to draw music and entertainment acts to Central New York that were bypassing the area in favor of Darien Lake Performing Arts Center, located approximately 120 miles west of the new amphitheater, and Saratoga Performing Arts Center, located approximately 140 miles east of the new amphitheater.

Construction began November 2014 and was completed August 24, 2015, at a cost of over $40 million. The amphitheater was designed by Westlake Reed Leskosky (now DLR Group) of Cleveland, OH. The venue opened on September 3, 2015 with a concert held by country singer, Miranda Lambert.

In 2016 the amphitheater was awarded “Best of the Best Government/Public Building Project” by Engineering News-Record as well as "Exceptional Facility Design" from New York State Recreation & Park Society.

St. Joseph's Health purchased the naming rights for the venue, with the new name going into effect beginning in June 2018. In October 2023, Empower Federal Credit Union paid $4 million for the amphitheater's naming rights for a 7 year period with the new venue name being Empower Federal Credit Union Amphitheater at Lakeview.

== Performances ==
The amphitheater's concert season usually runs from June through September with concerts occasionally occurring as early as May and as late as October. Since its first full season in 2016, the Empower Federal Credit Union Amphitheater has hosted an average of 17 shows per season. No shows were performed at the venue in 2020 due to the COVID-19 pandemic. Since opening, the venue has hosted over 200 different artists as of the 2023 season.

As of 2023, Breaking Benjamin & Zac Brown Band have each performed five times at Empower Federal Credit Union Amphitheater - tied for the most appearances by an artist at the venue. Luke Bryan, REO Speedwagon & Shinedown have each performed four times at the venue as of 2023.

Other performances have included Bad Wolves, Brantley Gilbert, Brett Eldredge, Caylee Hammack, Charley Crockett, Cheap Trick, Counting Crows, Crown the Empire, Dashboard Confessional, Don Felder, Five Finger Death Punch, Foreigner, Incubus, Jason Aldean, Joan Jett, Kane Brown, Kenny Chesney, Korn, Lady A, Marilyn Manson, Red Sun Rising, Rob Thomas, Slipknot, Steely Dan, Stone Sour, Tesla, 311, 5 Seconds of Summer, A Day to Remember, Abby Anderson, Alice in Chains, All Time Low, Alter Bridge, Andy Black, Anthrax, Atlas Genius, Atreyu, Avril Lavigne, Badflower, Bambara, Billy Idol, blink-182, Bob Dylan, Boston, Brett Young, Broken Hands, Bryan Adams, Bush, Carly Pearce, Caroline Jones, Casey Veggies, Chevelle, Chicago, Chris Stapleton, Code Orange, Cole Swindell, Craig Campbell, Dan Tyminski, Darrell Scott, Dave Mason, Dave Stryker, Dawes, Deadly Apples, DED, Def Leppard, Diamante, Dinosaur Pile-Up, Disturbed, DJ Drama, DJ Spider, Dorothy, Drake White, Dylan Scott, Earth, Wind & Fire, Elle King, Falling in Reverse, Fever 333, Fire From the Gods, Florida Georgia Line, Foo Fighters, Foster the People, Four Year Strong, Future, Godsmack, Grace VanderWaal, Gym Class Heroes, Halestorm, Daryl Hall & John Oates, Hank Williams, Jr., HARDY, Heart, Hey Violet, Hollywood Undead, iann dior, Imagine Dragons, Jackson Browne, James Taylor, Janet Jackson, Jelly Roll, Jhené Aiko, Jimmy Eat World, Joe Bonamassa, Joe Sumner, John Harvie, John Mayer, Jonas Brothers, Journey, Keith Urban, Kendell Marvel, Kid Rock, Killswitch Engage, Kings of Leon, KISS, Lainey Wilson, Lamb of God, Lilth Czar, Loverboy, Lukas Nelson, Luke Combs, Lynyrd Skynyrd, Machine Gun Kelly, Marcus King, Maren Morris, Margo Price, Mary J. Blige, Matchbox Twenty, Matt Nathanson, Mayer Hawthorne, Megadeth, Memphis May Fire, Miranda Lambert, My Morning Jacket, Napalm Death, Nas, Nathaniel Rateliff & the Night Sweats, Nothing More, O.A.R., Of Mice & Men, Old Dominion, ONE OK ROCK, Ozzy Osbourne, Pantera, Papa Roach, Paramore, Patty Griffin, Pentatonix, Peter Frampton, Phillip Phillips, Phish, Pittbull, Poison, Pop Evil, Rascall Flatts, Ringo Starr & His All-Starr Band, Rivers & Rust, Rob Zombie, Russell Dickerson, Saint Asonia, Santana, Scotty McCreery, Shania Twain, Silversun Pickups, Skillet, Slayer, Soccer Mommy, Sting, Sublime with Rome, Testament, The Aquadolls, The Charlie Daniels Band, The Chicks, The Goo Goo Dolls, The HU, The L.I.F.E. Project, The Marshall Tucker Band, The Offspring, The Pixies, The Pretty Reckless, The Story So Far, The Used, The Warning, The Wombats, Third Eye Blind, Thomas Rhett, Three Days Grace, Tim McGraw, Tyler Farr, Weezer, Whitesnake, Willie Nelson, Wiz Khalifa, Yelawolf, Yellowcard & ZZ Top.

== Attendance ==
According Pollstar, Empower Federal Credit Union Amphitheater has ranked in the top 50 in worldwide ticket sales for amphitheaters since the venue's first full season in 2016 (excluding 2020 when no concerts were held at the venue due to the COVID-19 pandemic).

Year	Worldwide Rank	Tickets Sold
2016	38	195,215
2017	46	157,931
2018	34	220,979
2019	50	92,421
2020	-	-
2021	50	74,114

== In popular culture ==
- Sheryl Crow filmed the music video for her song Roller Skate from her album Be Myself around the venue in 2017

== See also ==
- Empire Expo Center
- Live Nation
- New York State Fair
