= Lakeland, New York =

- Census-designated place
- Location in Onondaga County and the state of New York.
- Coordinates: 43°5′36″N 76°14′45″W
- Country: United States
- State: New York
- County: Onondaga

Area
  - Total: 1.49 sq mi (3.86 km^{2})
  - Land: 1.49 sq mi (3.86 km^{2})
  - Water: 0 sq mi (0.00 km^{2})
- Elevation: 479 ft (146 m)

Population (2020)
  - Total: 2,556
  - Density: 1,713.8/sq mi (661.71/km^{2})
- Time zone: UTC-5 (Eastern (EST))
  - Summer (DST): UTC-4 (EDT)
- FIPS code: 36-40607
- GNIS feature ID: 0954952

Lakeland is a hamlet (and census-designated place) in Onondaga County, New York, United States. As of the 2020 census, Lakeland had a population of 2,556. The community name is derived from its location next to Onondaga Lake.

The community is in the northwest part of the town of Geddes.

== History ==
From the latter part of the nineteenth century through the early years of the twentieth century, Lakeland was home to several upscale hotels and a small amusement park along the shores of Onondaga Lake. These were served by a trolley car line from Syracuse. However, the resort area began to decline before World War I and was gone by the Great Depression. The former resort area is now largely covered by Interstate 690 and parking areas for the New York State Fair, whose permanent grounds are at the southern edge of Lakeland.

== 1943 industrial waste flood ==
On Thanksgiving Day in 1943, 40,000 tons of industrial waste consisting of calcium carbonate and magnesia flooded Lakeland. The industrial waste broke through a waste bed retaining wall at the Solvay Process Company plant. Two square miles were covered by the waste, which reached as much as eight feet deep in some places. The Post-Standard reported in 1993 that "every tree, shrub or blade of grass within a square mile was dead". Parked cars were mired and flooded by the waste, including one car at the fairgrounds that was swept 1,000 feet.

All available Onondaga County Sheriff's Office deputies, as well as nearby fire departments, Solvay police, the New York State Police, the American Red Cross, and Solvay Process crews were called in to contain the flood and rescue residents. Volunteers from the SPCA were also present to help rescue animals and livestock. The Red Cross operated a shelter at the State Fair Hotel. There were no reported fatalities, but there were a few people injured, such as an auxiliary military policeman from Solvay Process who was treated for acid burns and two frozen toes after rescuing numerous stranded residents using a rowboat. Several animals, pets, and livestock were also rescued, though a pig, several geese and ducks, and hundreds of chickens drowned in the sludge. 55 residents were left homeless as a result of the flood.

The waste was initially intended to be removed by dumping truckloads of cinders into the waste until it solidified enough to be shoveled out, but that plan was scrapped in favor of dissolving the waste using water and eventually pumping it into Ninemile Creek, which flows into Onondaga Lake. The cleanup process took two months to complete. The houses affected by the flood, now destroyed and worthless, were purchased by Solvay Process and demolished.

An investigation launched by Solvay Process into the incident reported that the dykes at the plant were built of old Solvay waste, not dirt, and that they were built too rapidly. The investigation also stated that the demand for production during World War II was too great and help was too limited. After the incident, Solvay Process moved their waste beds away from the shoreline of Onondaga Lake.

Most of the affected area is now a parking lot for the fairgrounds.

== Community ==
The community includes a few gas stations, various food outlets, two churches, a few small restaurants, a car dealership, a credit union, Solvay Middle School, a hotel, and a golf course. All are within minutes of the New York State Fair.

== Geography ==
Lakeland is located at 43°5′36″N 76°14′45″W (43.093266, -76.245718).

According to the United States Census Bureau, the CDP has a total area of 1.5 square miles (3.9 km^{2}), all land.

Lakeland comprises the area along roughly the northern half of the southwest side of Onondaga Lake (which runs northwest to southeast).

Interstate 690 passes through the community.

== Demographics ==
Historical population
Census	Pop.	Note	%±
2020	2,556		—
U.S. Decennial Census

=== 2020 census ===
As of the 2020 census, Lakeland had a population of 2,556. The median age was 52.0 years. 15.6% of residents were under the age of 18 and 27.0% of residents were 65 years of age or older. For every 100 females there were 90.2 males, and for every 100 females age 18 and over there were 91.1 males age 18 and over.

100.0% of residents lived in urban areas, while 0.0% lived in rural areas.

There were 1,142 households in Lakeland, of which 19.9% had children under the age of 18 living in them. Of all households, 50.3% were married-couple households, 13.7% were households with a male householder and no spouse or partner present, and 28.9% were households with a female householder and no spouse or partner present. About 28.1% of all households were made up of individuals and 15.1% had someone living alone who was 65 years of age or older.

There were 1,188 housing units, of which 3.9% were vacant. The homeowner vacancy rate was 0.7% and the rental vacancy rate was 0.5%.

Racial composition as of the 2020 census
Race	Number	Percent
White	2,362	92.4%
Black or African American	32	1.3%
American Indian and Alaska Native	11	0.4%
Asian	5	0.2%
Native Hawaiian and Other Pacific Islander	0	0.0%
Some other race	10	0.4%
Two or more races	136	5.3%
Hispanic or Latino (of any race)	53	2.1%

=== 2000 census ===
As of the 2000 census, there were 2,852 people, 1,076 households, and 800 families residing in the CDP. The population density was 1,882.4 inhabitants per square mile (726.8/km^{2}). There were 1,111 housing units at an average density of 733.3 per square mile (283.1/km^{2}). The racial makeup of the CDP was 98.39% White, 0.21% African American, 0.18% Native American, 0.60% Asian, and 0.63% from two or more races. Hispanic or Latino of any race were 0.98% of the population.

There were 1,076 households, out of which 34.2% had children under the age of 18 living with them, 63.0% were married couples living together, 7.9% had a female householder with no husband present, and 25.6% were non-families. 21.1% of all households were made up of individuals, and 11.2% had someone living alone who was 65 years of age or older. The average household size was 2.65 and the average family size was 3.10.

In the CDP, the population was spread out, with 24.9% under the age of 18, 6.7% from 18 to 24, 27.4% from 25 to 44, 26.2% from 45 to 64, and 14.9% who were 65 years of age or older. The median age was 40 years. For every 100 females, there were 91.5 males. For every 100 females age 18 and over, there were 88.9 males.

The median income for a household in the CDP was $47,378, and the median income for a family was $54,667. Males had a median income of $41,159 versus $25,755 for females. The per capita income for the CDP was $21,000. About 4.0% of families and 4.9% of the population were below the poverty line, including 6.0% of those under age 18 and 3.0% of those age 65 or over.

== Education ==
The school district is Solvay Union Free School District.
