= Solvay, New York =

- Village
- Location in Onondaga County and the state of New York.
- Coordinates: 43°3′26″N 76°12′53″W
- Country: United States
- State: New York
- County: Onondaga
- Founded: 1794

Government
  - Type: Village
  - Mayor: Derek Baichi

Area
  - Total: 1.62 sq mi (4.19 km^{2})
  - Land: 1.62 sq mi (4.19 km^{2})
  - Water: 0 sq mi (0.00 km^{2})
- Elevation: 499 ft (152 m)

Population (2020)
  - Total: 6,645
  - Density: 4,111.6/sq mi (1,587.49/km^{2})
- Time zone: UTC-5 (Eastern (EST))
  - Summer (DST): UTC-4 (EDT)
- ZIP code: 13209
- Area code: 315
- FIPS code: 36-68286
- GNIS feature ID: 0965631
- Website: villageofsolvay.com

Solvay is a village located in the town of Geddes, Onondaga County, New York, United States, and a suburb of the city of Syracuse. As of the 2020 census, the population was 6,645. The village is named after the Solvay brothers, Belgian inventors of the chemical process employed by the Solvay Process Company, formerly the major industry of the village.

== History ==
The area was within the former Central New York Military Tract, but Solvay was in a location reserved for members of the Onondaga tribe.

The village was initially founded in 1794 by James Geddes and was initially called "Geddesburgh." The first residents were mostly Irish, subsequently joined by Tyroleans and Poles. Eventually the community became known for its population largely Italian in extraction. It still retains a large segment (about 35% in 2005) of population of Italian descent. More recently many families of Ukrainian descent have settled in the village.

The village was renamed "Solvay" after 1884, when the Solvay Process Company built a Solvay process plant to produce soda ash. The Village of Solvay was incorporated in 1895. Other major businesses of Solvay include the Frazer & Jones Company (Division of the Eastern Company), a foundry; Crucible Steel, producer of specialty steels; Iroquois China Company (Solvay China); Pass & Seymour, producing electrical wiring devices.

The Solvay Process plant, by then owned by Allied Chemical and Dye Corporation, closed in 1985. The community has remained stable despite this loss.

Upland Farm, the Frederick R. Hazard residence built in 1899; Joseph Lyman Silsbee, architect

Reflecting paternalistic programs of the Solvay Process Company and the Hazard family, the first village and school library was in Guild Hall. Then Solvay received a Carnegie library in 1902. James A. Randall of Syracuse was the architect (1902–05). The building was constructed with Hazard support.

Since the Hazards' time, the village has provided superior services, as envisioned by the family. Solvay has its own municipal electric company which provides service to the village at one of the least expensive rates in the nation. A typical three bedroom home in the village which is completely electric (meaning no natural gas service) sees an average bill of around $225 per month in the winter and $160 in the summer (2009).

The Solvay Public Library was listed on the National Register of Historic Places in 2007.

== Geography ==
Solvay is located at 43°3′26″N 76°12′53″W (43.057316, -76.214649), immediately west of Syracuse and south of the New York State Fairgrounds (far westside). Its eastern boundary is shared with Syracuse. The village is south of the east end of Onondaga Lake and is also south of Interstate 690. The Erie Canal passes through the village.

According to the United States Census Bureau, the village has a total area of 1.6 square miles (4.1 km^{2}), all land.

== Demographics ==
Historical population
| Census | Pop. | Note | %± |
|---|---|---|---|
| 1890 | 563 | | — |
| 1900 | 3,493 | | 520.4% |
| 1910 | 5,139 | | 47.1% |
| 1920 | 7,352 | | 43.1% |
| 1930 | 7,986 | | 8.6% |
| 1940 | 8,201 | | 2.7% |
| 1950 | 7,868 | | −4.1% |
| 1960 | 8,732 | | 11.0% |
| 1970 | 8,280 | | −5.2% |
| 1980 | 7,140 | | −13.8% |
| 1990 | 6,717 | | −5.9% |
| 2000 | 6,845 | | 1.9% |
| 2010 | 6,584 | | −3.8% |
| 2020 | 6,645 | | 0.9% |
U.S. Decennial Census

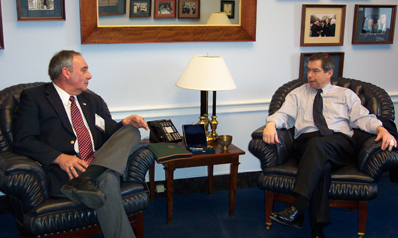
Former Mayor Anthony Modafferi meets with former Congressman Jim Walsh

As of the census of 2000, there were 6,844 people, 3,030 households, and 1,766 families residing in the village. The population density was 4,164.6 inhabitants per square mile (1,608.0/km^{2}). There were 3,291 housing units at an average density of 2,002.3 per square mile (773.1/km^{2}). The racial makeup of the village was 95.81% White, 0.67% African American, 1.02% Native American, 0.39% Asian, 0.06% Pacific Islander, 0.29% from other races, and 1.75% from two or more races. Hispanic or Latino of any race were 2.37% of the population.

There were 3,030 households, out of which 26.8% had children under the age of 18 living with them, 39.4% were married couples living together, 14.4% had a female householder with no husband present, and 41.7% were non-families. 35.9% of all households were made up of individuals, and 16.1% had someone living alone who was 65 years of age or older. The average household size was 2.26 and the average family size was 2.94.

In the village, the population was spread out, with 23.3% under the age of 18, 8.5% from 18 to 24, 27.7% from 25 to 44, 20.6% from 45 to 64, and 20.0% who were 65 years of age or older. The median age was 38 years. For every 100 females, there were 85.9 males. For every 100 females age 18 and over, there were 82.5 males.

The median income for a household in the village was $34,084, and the median income for a family was $40,057. Males had a median income of $34,045 versus $23,822 for females. The per capita income for the village was $19,441. About 10.6% of families and 12.0% of the population were below the poverty line, including 20.2% of those under age 18 and 7.3% of those age 65 or over.

== Education ==
The school district is Solvay Union Free School District.
