= Solvay Public Library =

- U.S. National Register of Historic Places
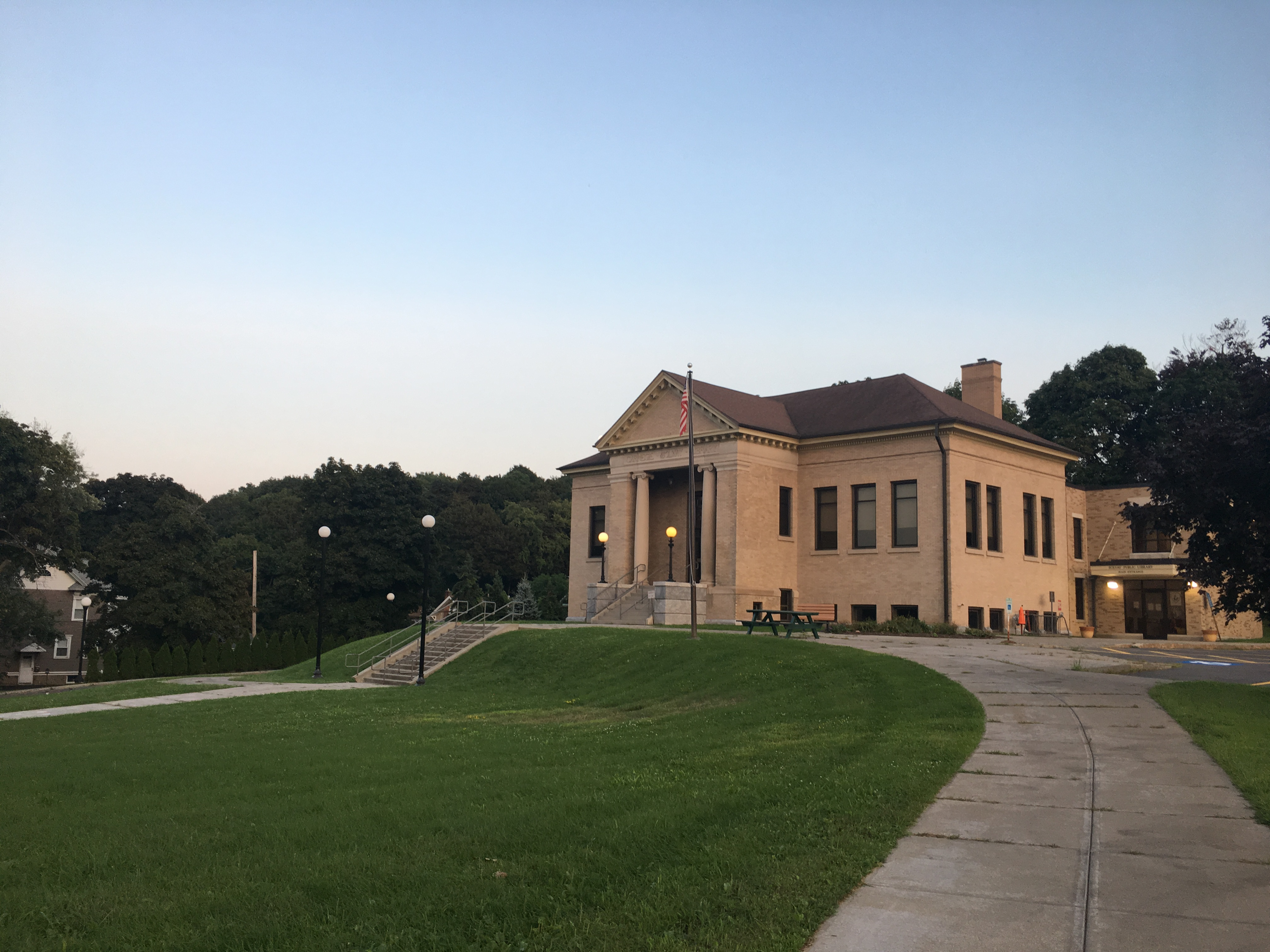

- Location within New York Location within the United States
- Location: 615 Woods Rd., Solvay, New York
- Coordinates: 43°3′27″N 76°12′26″W
- Area: 1.1 acres (0.45 ha)
- Built: 1903-1905
- Architect: Randall, James A.
- Architectural style: Classical Revival
- NRHP reference No.: 07001124
- Added to NRHP: October 31, 2007

The Solvay Public Library is a historic Carnegie library building located at Solvay in Onondaga County, New York. It was built between 1903 and 1905, and is a one-story, buff-colored brick building on a high basement. It has a hipped roof and Classical Revival style design elements including a distyle-in-antis portico in the Ionic order. It was built in part with a $10,000 donation from Andrew Carnegie.

It was listed on the National Register of Historic Places in 2007.

It was renovated in recent years with focus on preserving and restoring historically accurate details.
