= Ellen Mitchell (philosopher) =

American philosopher and educator

Ellen M. Mitchell (1838–1920) was an American philosopher, educator, and education reformer. She was one of the first women to be appointed lecturer in a university, in addition to writing philosophy, literature, and literary criticism.

== Biography ==
Ellen M. Smith was born in the Village of Geddes, New York to Harriet H. Rowland and Edwin R. Smith, the eldest of their four children. In 1851, when Ellen was a teenager, the escaped slave William "Jerry" Henry was released from jail in the adjacent City of Syracuse by a band of citizens, cementing central New York's reputation as a hotbed of abolition. She graduated from the Cortland Academy, Homer, N.Y. in 1860, with a major in classics. Ellen, also, taught school in Syracuse, New York. During the Civil War her brother, Edwin R. Smith, Jr., served in New York's 149th Regiment. Edwin was killed in the Battle of Chancellorsville, May 3, 1863. He was initially reported severely wounded; the family tried to determine whether the Confederates had captured him and treated him in the Confederate field hospital at Ellwood Manor. However, Edwin was lost without a trace. Ellen adopted the pen name "Ella Ellwood" in identification with Edwin, writing with the name Ellwood during the war. Following Edwin's death, Ellen resigned her teaching position in Syracuse and moved to Cairo, Illinois, where she lived with her uncle, Ward L. Smith and his wife, Anna.

During the war, Ellen moved to St. Louis, Missouri. She wrote for the Missouri Republican newspaper of St. Louis, continuing to use the pen name Ella Ellwood until the war's end. She married St. Louis attorney and Union civil war veteran Joseph W. Mitchell in the Presbyterian Church of Alton, Illinois in September, 1867. Alton, Illinois had been, before the war, a primary source of advocacy for abolition of slavery, and was the location of the murder of the influential abolitionist advocate, the Presbyterian minister Rev. Elijah P. Lovejoy, and the destruction of his printing press by a pro-slavery mob from St. Louis. The marriage of Ellen and Joseph was, thus, their consecration to the union cause. While in St. Louis, she attended the Hegelian philosophy lectures which had been organized there by William T. Harris. She and Joseph also contributed to a literary and philosophical discussion group called "The Pen & Pencil Club," often hosting the meetings in their home.

Ellen and Joseph moved to Denver, Colorado in 1878, seeking effective treatment for Joseph's illness (possibly tuberculosis). However, Joseph died in February, 1879. Ellen remained in Denver, where she taught school and, then, lectured on philosophy and literature in the University of Denver. Also, she actively contributed to the Kant Club, and to the Fortnightly Club, of Denver.

Mitchell attended the first session, in July 1879, of the Concord Summer School of Philosophy, which was hosted in Concord, Massachusetts, by Bronson Alcott on his property. William T. Harris organized the school and its programs after leaving St. Louis, with the intention of unifying the Hegelian Idealism of the St. Louis Philosophical Society with the Transcendentalism of Concord. At that first 1879 session, Ellen became acquainted with many women from across the country who were leading the struggle for women's suffrage, as well as the efforts to improve educational and social policy standards. Among those she met while attending the 1879 Concord session was Julia Ward Howe who, later, became the president of the Association for the Advancement of Women. The Concord School played an important role in helping to build networks of policy reformers; more than one half of those who attended were women. Mrs. Mitchell participated in the annual Concord School of Philosophy every year, until its final session in 1888. She wrote, in 1880, a description of the lectures during the previous session, and she delivered a paper titled "Friendship in Aristotle's Ethics" during the Concord session of July, 1887.

Mitchell actively contributed to the Association for the Advancement of Women, regularly attending the annual congresses. At the 12th Woman's Congress in 1884, held at Baltimore, she delivered a paper titled "A Study of Hegel." By the A.A.W.'s 13th Congress, held at Des Moines, Iowa, she was Vice Pres. of the A.A.W. for Colorado. At that same 13th Annual Congress, Prof. Maria Mitchell, of Vassar College, New York, and Ellen M. Mitchell, of Chicago (Mrs. Francis Mitchell) also were serving the A.A.W. as V.P.'s for the states of New York and Illinois, respectively. At the A.A.W.'s 18th Women's Congress, at Toronto in 1890, Mitchell delivered a paper titled, "The Dramas of Henrik Ibsen." Continuing as V. P. of the A.A.W. for Colorado, she was "Chairman" of the A.A.W.'s Committee for Topics and Papers. For the A.A.W.'s 19th Woman's Congress in 1891, at Grand Rapids, Mich., she continued serving as V.P. for Colorado, as the Chair of the Topics & Papers Committee, and she delivered a paper titled "The Real and the Ideal in Art."

Throughout her career, Mitchell advocated, and endeavored to realize, the noble aspiration for American philosophy which was advocated by Walt Whitman in his great poetic essay manifesto of 1871, "Democratic Vistas".

After 1890, she permanently returned to Geddes (by then a part of Syracuse) to care for her parents. In Syracuse, she organized and led the Round-Table of Syracuse, a literary and philosophical community adult seminar group. The Round Table began in 1894 and continued for more than 20 years. To assist the participants in their studies and discussions, Mitchell wrote and privately published a series of essays on Dante, Tennyson, and Goethe. The title for one of the essays, "The Way of the Soul" is adapted from Hegel's introduction to his Phenomenology of Spirit. In her introduction to the essay, she wrote:—

"The Round Table of Syracuse is composed of a number of women who meet, season after season, to study and discuss the great books of the world. They believe with Lowell that the truths which literature interprets can be known only by study of the supreme literary masterpieces. They seek to trace the influence of literature upon art and their reciprocal relation to the history and social movements of an epoch.

A clear yet spiritual interpretation of the author's meaning is diligently sought at first without the aid of any commentary. This plan stimulates the members to do their own thinking, to discover for themselves what the original work has to say that they can comprehend. Later, the help of commentaries is welcomed, ideas are compared and sifted, and opinion separated from knowledge.

One aim of the Round Table is rational conversation. By question and answer, by informal discussion, by the living contact of mind with mind, thought is quickened and stimulated, and many a problem independently suggested and solved.

The studies pursued during the season of 1901-1902 relate for the most part to the dominant ideas of the nineteenth century as expressed in literature, art, philosophy, and science. Selections from the great prose writers were followed by a comparative study of Tennyson's 'In Memoriam' and Dante's 'Divine Comedy'. To sum up the spiritual gain of this work is impossible. The following essay simply seeks to trace 'The Way of the Soul' out of the 'shadow of night' into the 'daybreak.' Syracuse, March 15, 1902."

Mitchell died in Syracuse, N.Y. May 14, 1920 at the age of 81, three months before the 19th amendment to the constitution was ratified, finally establishing universal suffrage. She is interred beside her parents in the Myrtle Hill Cemetery of the Village of Geddes.

In her obituary, May 16, 1920, the Syracuse Herald newspaper commented: "The Herald records with sincere regret the death of Mrs. Ellen M. Mitchell, for many years the gentle preceptor and oracle of the Syracuse Round Table. The value of her services to the literary life of the city cannot easily be overestimated....Mrs. Mitchell's personality was singularly lovable, and it imparted a magnetic charm to her discourse and her teaching. On its intellectual side the City of Syracuse is much the poorer by her death."

== Philosophy ==
"A Study of Greek Philosophy", Mitchell's book length philosophical discussion, was published in 1891 by S.C.Griggs & Co. The book contains 36 chapter essays, chronologically presenting the development of the classical Greek tradition in philosophy, extending from the pre-Socratics to the neo-Platonists. Her book is the first book length philosophical analysis to have been written in America by a woman scholar. It guides university students, philosophy specialists, educators, and adult scholars through a program of study of the ancient Greek tradition in philosophy. The book is, also, the first book to preserve the legacy of ancient Greek philosophy in the New World.

In her introduction to her book, Mitchell wrote:—

"It may be interesting to my readers to know something of the genesis of this book. Twelve years ago, in St. Louis, a little band of women used to assemble every week to study and discuss the problems of philosophy. I led the circle as teacher and learner. Beginning with the study of Greek thought, and applying myself diligently to the works of the great masters, and the commentaries to be found in English, German and French, I sought continually to make clear to others what became clear to myself. At the end of two years, the circle in St. Louis was exchanged for one in Denver, but with unabated interest and enthusiasm on my part and that of my co-workers. At their request, the verbal exposition became a written one, and finally developed into its present form. Whatever merit it possesses is due in part to those who have helped me towards the light by their eager questions, their hesitation at the obscure, their quick appreciation of spiritual truth hidden beneath obscure phraseology, their loving fellowship and sympathy. Above all other teachers I am indebted to Dr. William T. Harris. From him I first learned to seek philosophy in the history of philosophy, and to find it everywhere as the spiritual interpretation of the universe. I have also received help and stimulus from the expositions and lectures of Prof. F. Louis Soldan, of St. Louis; Prof. D.J. Snider, of Chicago; Prof. Thomas Davidson, of New York; from the Concord School of Philosophy; and the Kant Club, of Denver."

Reviews of the book were offered by prominent scholars and thought leaders when it was published in 1891:

- Dr. W.T. Harris, U.S. Commissioner of Education: "It shows on every page evidence of scholarship in the best lines, and of real insight into the questions discussed."
- S.H. Howison, Prof. of Philosophy, University of California, Berkeley: "I am deeply gratified to read in English, at last, a work on the great Greek thinkers that does not 'condescend' toward them as if they were infantile minds compared with moderns, but brings to convincing light the truly permanent value of their thinking."
- Edmund Clarence Stedman: "This survey, with its analysis of the Greek schools, is the most clear and inclusive, as far as my knowledge extends, that has been made in our language within so compact a space. It is of genuine value."
- Prof. Louis J. Block, Chicago: "Admirable in spirit and excellent in matter. I do not know where a clearer and more useful history of Greek philosophy is to be found."
- Frank Sanborn, in Springfield Republican: "There is probably no manual better than this for those who would begin the study of the Greek masters, and yet the book lacks the dryness of manuals and has an interest for all thoughtful readers."
- Caroline K. Sherman, in Chicago Herald: "This is no superficial hand-book giving a hasty survey of Greek thought - no condensed, simplified form of a larger treatise. It is a careful study from original sources of the great thinkers of antiquity, and it is presented to willing students in a form that will tempt them to go likewise to the same original sources."
- Science, New York: "This work is written in an earnest, serious spirit, and with an evident desire to present the truth as the writer understands it. It is impartial too as between the different schools of thinkers, none of them being slighted, and no decided preference shown for one over another except as their real importance demands it."
- Vouga's Art Folio, New York: "The work is comprehensive, and the author has, in a clear compact manner, given a place to each school, following the sequences in a style likely to impress the readers most forcibly, while the explanations and deductions show a most thorough and careful study of a complex and sometimes confused subject."
- Review of Reviews, New York: "This little work is an interesting, valuable, and very comprehensive view of the whole course of Greek philosophic thought."
- The Scotsman, Edinburgh: "The book is one from which the general readers can gather a clear idea of the drift of Greek thought, its subject-matter and development, which will serve as an excellent groundwork for further study."
- The Methodist Review, Volume 52 (1892): "The value of philosophy is the basal assumption in the issue of the above volume. Because of its lofty range of inquiry, its thought discipline, and its search after the ultimate truth, it ranks among the chief studies that can occupy human attention. Greek philosophy also, from its antecedent and fundamental relation to the later philosophic systems, is a perpetual body of instruction. Its maxims have an enduring charm for men; its theories, if dissented from, are wisely conceived; its leaders are among the great schoolmasters of the world. In a circle of St. Louis women, where the study of Greek thought was undertaken under the lead of the present author, the book now considered had its origin. From the rise of philosophy in Greece, under the Ionians, to its close following Neo-Platonism the historic review here sweeps. The personality of many great leaders of Grecian thought-as Pythagoras, Socrates, Plato, Aristotle, and Zeno-is set forth with clearness; and the differing systems which they gave to their age and the world are traced with sufficient outline for the full understanding of the whole range of Grecian inquiry in those great centuries of intellectual activity. It is instructive in these days, when the materialistic is receiving its full share of notice at the expense of the ideal, to notice such a circle of learners as that which gave the present volume its origin; and in the published result of their philosophic pursuits a wider circle of readers should find enjoyment and edification."
- Julia Ward Howe, in Literary World, Boston: "Mrs. Mitchell's volume is evidently the work of one who loves philosophy for its own sake. No tiresome pedantry, no encyclopedic dryness is found in its pages, but an earnest desire to present the theme in a graphic and tangible form, which shall rather invite the reader to its further study than discourage him with a mass of difficulties not to be overcome. A wholesome, appreciative, intelligible book. The volume of some two hundred eighty pages represents wide reading and careful study. Its contents belong to that easy reading which does not come of easy writing, but of the endeavor on the part of the writer to make "the crooked straight and rough places plain," an endeavor which cannot in this field be too highly commended. Mrs. Mitchell conveys much valuable information and suggestion in a small space, but does not fatigue the reader with overcrowding facts and statements. Rev. W.R. Alger, highly reputed as a student and lover of philosophy, contributes a brief paper on the "Claim and Charm" of his favorite pursuit."

William R. Alger, in his introduction to the book wrote, in part:—

"The etymological force of the word philosophy is the love of wisdom. Seizing this, we grasp a descriptive phrase, not a definition; we take possession of the practical substance but miss the dialectic essence. Wisdom is knowledge enriching experience with blessed fruits. Wisdom is assimilative insight in fruition at its goal. But, let us leave the surface of description, and enter the depth of definition. What is philosophy? It is that form of thinking wherein all the parts imply one another, and every part implies the whole. It is that kind of knowledge which has its presuppositions in itself, and is, therefore, independent of all other knowledge, while all other knowledge is dependent upon it. It is the self-seizure of the idea in reflective consciousness. It is the science of self-activity. It is the pure search after the First Principle, the finding of it, and the deduction thence of all else. It takes for its province those elements and methods which are common to all the special sciences, and groups them in a sovereign unification. Hence, with entire justice, it has generally been designated the science of sciences, queen of all the rest. Strenuous efforts have recently been made in several elaborate lectures to show that ethical science does not depend either on religion or philosophy, but is every way competent to itself. This is a shallow confusion of thought, and an unwarrantable use of language. The case may be conclusively stated in a nutshell thus: Philosophy is the science of ultimate grounds. Morality is the science of right and wrong in human conduct."

Mitchell focused her writings on the philosophy of history, philosophy of art, political ethics, transcendentalism, and Phidias and Plato. While lecturing at the Denver University she was one of the first to introduce women to idealist thought, the other being Marietta Kies.

In "The Philosophy of Pessimism", she was one of the philosophers who resisted philosophical systems that grew out of the skeptical tradition. They were not interested in determining what is not true, possible, or real. She only believed in positive theories that relied on what God created, like nature rather than based on human reason and judgment, it was based on the God-given world. Mitchell was part of the idealist philosophers.

One of her larger successes was "A Study of Hegel." This seventeen page article did not discuss Hegel's theories in detail. It does discuss important issues for women, as well as nature, art, and religion. There is a paragraph in the article that distorts Hegel's thought by using her own thoughts:—

"We communicate with the outward world through the organs of sense; but the impressions received by this means are confused and unrelated, and do not of themselves constitute knowledge, until they have been referred to the unifying power of thought."

This conflicts with Hegel's belief as the mind must not be said to stand apart from the world as Mitchell here implies. This paragraph starts the same as Hegel's belief of communicating with the world through senses, but it changes to hers about how to gain the power of knowledge is through using these senses to your individual experiences in life. This shows that she did not always just state other philosopher beliefs, but also had her own philosophies. When it came to the person and society Mitchell said that someone being away from social order is impossible. She states that "social institutions play a critical role in individual self-determination", meaning that in order to rise above, an individual must become a part of society to be able to rise above it.

In her book A Study of Greek Philosophy, she claims the object of knowledge in philosophy is the human spirit itself, and truth is a living process which develops and advances in the civilizing course of humanity. Later in the book it reveals that we gain self-knowledge as we gain more experiences in life that affects our knowledge and become who we are.

== Publications ==
The St. Louis Years

- "Just In Time" (story) in Peterson's Ladies National Magazine, (Vol.60., August,1871).
- "George Eliot" (essay) in Arthur's Magazine, (Vol.41, No.6, p. 373, June,1873).
- "Edward Bulwer, Lord Lytton" (essay) in Arthur's Magazine, (Vol.41, No.8, p. 502, August,1873).
- "Norah's New Year" (story) in Godey's Magazine, (Vol.88, No.523, p. 57, January,1874).
- "Gerald Massey" (essay) in Arthur's Magazine, (Vol.42, No.2, p. 83, February,1874).
- "The Alhambra" (essay) in Arthur's Magazine, (Vol.42, No.3, p. 151, March,1874).
- "John Stuart Mill" (essay) in Arthur's Magazine, (Vol.42, No.4, p. 216, April,1874).
- "Taine's 'Ideal in Art'" (essay) in Godey's Magazine, (Vol.88, No.526, p. 325, April,1874).
- "Thomas Carlyle" (essay) in Arthur's Magazine, (Vol.42, No.5, p. 283, May,1874).
- "Thomas Hughes" (essay) in Arthur's Magazine, (Vol.42, No.7, p. 409, July,1874).
- "Two Ways of Telling A Story: Her Way & His Way" in Godey's Magazine, (Vol.89, No.530, p. 137, August,1874).
- "Gustave Dore" (essay) in Arthur's Magazine, (Vol.42, No.8, p. 471, August,1874).
- "Olive Wayne" (story) in Godey's Magazine, (Vol.89, No.532, p. 322, October,1874).
- "A Plea For Fallen Women" (essay) at the (2nd World Congress of Women, October 15–17, 1874, in Chicago).
- "Murillo" (essay) in Arthur's Magazine, (Vol.42, No.10, p. 607, October,1874).
- "Fritz" (story) in The Independent Magazine, (Vol.26, No.134, p. 15, 1874).
- "The Rev. Charles Kingsley" (essay) in Arthur's Magazine, (Vol.42, No.11, p. 676, November,1874).
- "Washington Irving" (essay) in Arthur's Magazine, (Vol.42, No.12, p. 745, December,1874).
- "Charles Reade" (essay) in Arthur's Magazine, (Vol.43, No.4, p. 91, February,1875).
- "J.M.W. Turner, R.A." (essay) in Arthur's Magazine, (Vol.43, No.4, p. 222, April,1875).
- "John Ruskin" (essay) in Arthur's Magazine, (Vol 43, No.6, p. 342, June,1875).
- "De Quincey's Brother" (essay) in The Independent, (Vol. 27, No.1390, p. 26, July 22, 1875).
- "Charlotte Bronte" (essay) in Arthur's Magazine, (43, No.8, p. 476, August,1875).
- "Elizabeth Barrett Browning" (essay) in Arthur's Magazine, (Vol.43, No.11, p. 642, November,1875).
- "Margaret Fuller Ossoli" (essay) in Arthur's Magazine, (Vol.44, No.3, p,134, March,1876).
- "Ben Jonson" (essay) in Arthur's Magazine, (Vol.44, No.9, p. 471, September,1876).
- "Sydney Smith" (essay) in Arthur's Magazine, (Vol.44, No.11, p. 580, November,1876).
- "Chaucer" (essay) in Arthur's Magazine, (Vol.45, No.1, p. 14, January, 1877).
- "Boys' & Girls' Treasury: MARMONTEL" (story) in Arthur's Magazine, (Vol.45, No.3, p. 162, March,1877).
- "Thomas De Quincey (essay) in Arthur's Magazine, (Vol.45, No.4, p.183, April,1877).
- "Johann Friedrich Schiller" (essay) in Arthur's Magazine, (Vol.45, No.9, p. 455, September,1877).
- "For The Young: Marmontel" (story) in After Work, p. 159-160, August,1879).

The Denver, Concord Summer School of Philosophy, Assoc.for Advancement of Women, and University of Denver Years

- "An Oriental Mystic" in The Journal of Speculative Philosophy, (Vol.14,#2, April,1880).
- "Concord School of Philosophy" in The Free Religious Index,(Sept.,1880) reprnt in vol.1, Women in the St.Louis Idealist Mvmnt
- "A Study of Hegel" in Papers Read Before the Assoc. for the Advancement of Women, 12th Congress of Women, (Baltimore, Md., 1884).
- "The Philosophy of Pessimism" in The Journal of Speculative Philosophy, (Vol.20, #2, April,1886): 187–94.
- "Friendship in Aristotle's Ethics," Concord School of Philosophy lecture synopsis, The Boston Even Transcript (27 July 1887).
- "The Platonic Dialectic" in The Journal of Speculative Philosophy, (Vol.22, 1888): 212–23.
- "My Lost Bracelet" (story) in Peterson's Magazine, (Vol. XCII, No.2, p. 139, February,1888).
- "The Dramas of Henrik Ibsen" in Papers Read Before the Assoc. for the Advancement of Women, 18th Congress of Women, (Toronto, 1890).
- A Study of Greek Philosophy (Chicago, S.C. Griggs & Company, 1891).
- "The Real and the Ideal in Art" in Papers Read Before the Assoc. for the Advancement of Women, 19th Congress of Women, (Grand Rapids, 1891)
- "Twelve Lessons on Dante's Divina Commedia" (syllabus). Denver, 1892.

"The Paradise of Dante" (Syracuse, Hall & McChesney, 1898)

The Syracuse Years

- "The Paradise of Dante" in Poet-Lore (Aug-Sept.,1895): 399–405.
- "The Paradise of Dante" (Syracuse, Hall & McChesney, 1898).
- "Dante's Piccarda" (Syracuse, The Home Talent Magazine, Dorcas Circle of Furman Street Church, December, 1896)
- "A Study of Faust" (Syracuse, Hall & McChesney, 1899)
- "The Hidden Soul of Harmony" (Syracuse, Hall & McChesney, 1900).
- "The Way of the Soul; A Comparative Study of Dante & Tennyson" (Syracuse, Hall & McChesney, 1902)
- "Beatific Vision: A Study of Dante" (Syracuse, Hall & McChesney, 1905).
- "Julia Ward Howe" (Syracuse, Hall & McChesney, 1910).
- "At Last" (poem,1910)
