= Wade Shows =

Wade Shows, Inc.
- Type: Privately held company
- Industry: Amusement rides
- Founded: 1912
- Headquarters: Livonia, Michigan
- Key people: Frank Zaitshik(President) /(Owner)
- Products: Amusement ride rental/operation and traveling carnival management
- Website: wadeshows.com

Wade Shows, Inc. is a traveling carnival midway company based in Livonia, Michigan. It provides amusement rides, games and concessions for local, county and state fairs throughout the eastern and central United States. The company also has an office in Spring Hill, Florida, location of its winter quarters.

== History ==
Wade Shows was founded in 1912 by Leander "Lee" Wade. The family-owned company began playing at small events in the greater Detroit area, first known as Imperial Shows, and later Joyland Midway Attractions after Lee Wade retired. Wallace G. "W.G." Wade, the oldest son of Lee Wade, started his own operation in 1916 called W.G. Wade Shows. Like his father's company, W.G. Wade Shows began locally, and would later provide carnival attractions at other events throughout Michigan. In 1952, the Michigan State Fair would be added to their route for the first time. W.G. Wade managed the company until his death in 1956, when his son Wallace G. "Glenn" Wade Jr. took over.

Prior to W.G. Wade's death, Glenn Wade operated his own midway company, which would later be combined with W.G. Wade Shows. He would serve as the first president of the Outdoor Amusement Business Association, founded in 1964, and remained a member until his death in 2008. During that time, W.G. Wade Shows also joined carnival syndicate, Amusement Corporation of America, in order to make the company more known throughout the country.

W.G. Wade Shows would be acquired in 1984 by current owner Frank Zaitshik, who maintains offices in both Michigan and Florida. licensed under Wade Shows, Inc.Shop and maintenance city located in Florida at: 16958 US Highway 41 Brooksville, FL, 34610-3741 United States. Today, Wade Shows operates over 100 amusement rides and attractions which serve millions of fairgoers annually. Like other carnival midway companies, many of their rides have become eco-friendly including the use of LED lighting and biodiesel fueled generators as well as participating in recycling programs with area fair managers.

Wade Shows has been competitive in bidding to provide midways at state fairs, including winning a ten-year contract for the Great New York State Fair in 2014 (shared with Dreamland Amusements). Some other state fairs the company currently works include the North Alabama State Fair, North Carolina State Fair (shared with Powers Great American Midways), Oklahoma State Fair, Florida State Fair, Missouri State Fair, Delaware State Fair and Nebraska State Fair.
