= The Eastern Company =

- Company type: Public
- Traded as: Nasdaq: EML
- Industry: Small Tools & Accessories
- Founded: 1858; 168 years ago
- Headquarters: Naugatuck, Connecticut, United States
- Key people: Leonard F. Fagenza (CEO, president, chairman) (2012.12)
- Products: Security products, metal products, industry hardware
- Subsidiaries: Big3; Velvac; Eberhard
- Website: easterncompany.com

The Eastern Company is an American engineering and manufacturing company headquartered in Naugatuck, Connecticut. The company operates in three segments: Industrial Hardware; Security Products; Metal Products.

As of November, 2013 the company owned four main subsidiaries namely Eberhard Hardware Manufacturing (Canada); Sesamee Mexicana (Mexico); World Lock Co. (Taiwan); World Security Industries (Hong Kong).

== History ==
The company was established in 1858 by B.B. Tuttle and J.H. Whittemore as the Tuttle & Whittemore iron works.

During the American Civil War (1861 ~ 1865) the company' products sales grew dramatically. In 1887, the company changed its name to Naugatauk Malleable Iron Company until 1912 when the company was incorporated as Eastern Malleable Iron Company.

From 1930s to 1960s the company underwent an important revolution in its history. Dibble shut down four of the six plants and used about $800,000 to buy Cleveland's Eberhard Manufacturing Company in 1936. After that in 1944, Eastern bought the Frazer & Jones malleable iron works of Syracuse, New York. Later in 1947 Eastern again bought the Eastern Castings Corporation of Newburgh, New York. After World War II, The company purchased the Pattin Manufacturing Company of Marietta, Ohio in 1955 and shut down Wilmington foundry in 1961. It was also in the same year that the company once again changed its name, this time to The Eastern Company.

During 1960s-80s and beyond, the company ushered the second tide of acquisition and Divestitures including Wilfrid O. White & Sons, Inc., Thompson Materials Company, Illinois Lock Company of Wheeling and so on.

In 2017 the company acquired Velvac an US manufacturer of products for medium and heavy duty commercial trucks. In 2019 the company acquired plastic packaging provider Big 3 Precision.

== Products and services ==
The Eastern Company focuses on the security products, metal products and industrial hardware.

=== Industrial Hardware ===
Different kinds of locks and latches, hinges, sleeper boxes, and other hardware widely used in vehicles of agriculture, education, military, sports, fire and medical, and some industry markets.

=== Security Products ===
Electronic and mechanical locking devices (such as timers, drop meters, coin security products, smart cards and related equipment and technology, value transfer stations, access control units, and some appliances in kitchen) for electric equipment in consumer market and gaming industries. The company also provides security products such as luggage, furniture, laboratory equipment and commercial laundry.

=== Metal Products ===
Expansion support anchors for the roofs of mines, couplers for railroad braking systems, clamps for construction, and fittings for electrical installations.
