= Geddes, New York =

- Town
- Location in Onondaga County and the state of New York.
- Coordinates: 43°3′29″N 76°13′8″W
- Country: United States
- State: New York
- County: Onondaga

Government
  - Type: Town Council
  - Town Supervisor: Susan LaFex (R)
  - Town Council: Members' List: • Robert A. Krupa (D); • Jonathan M. Lorber (R); • Gerald Albrigo (R); • David Murphy (D); • E. Robert Czaplicki (R); • Paul Valenti (R)

Area
  - Total: 12.26 sq mi (31.75 km^{2})
  - Land: 9.15 sq mi (23.71 km^{2})
  - Water: 3.10 sq mi (8.04 km^{2})
- Elevation: 371 ft (113 m)

Population (2020)
  - Total: 17,088
  - Density: 1,867/sq mi (720.7/km^{2})
- Time zone: UTC-5 (Eastern (EST))
  - Summer (DST): UTC-4 (EDT)
- ZIP Codes: 13209 (Solvay); 13219 (Syracuse)
- Area code: 315
- FIPS code: 36-28519
- GNIS feature ID: 0978988
- Website: townofgeddes.gov

Geddes is a town in Onondaga County, New York, United States. As of the 2020 Census, the population was 17,088.

The Town of Geddes is west of the neighborhood of Far Westside of Syracuse. The town is a western suburb of Syracuse.

== History ==
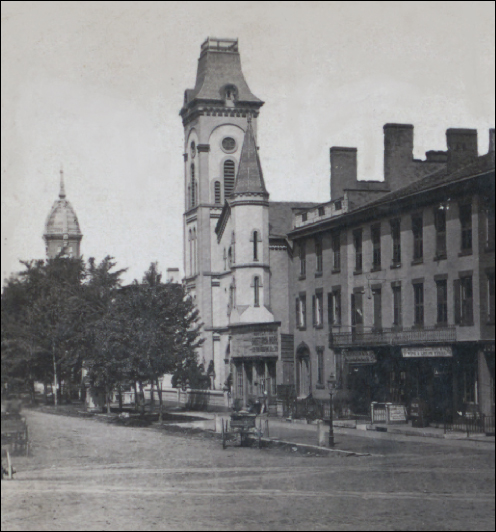
Village of Geddes, 1624 West Genesee Street - old town square about 1875 - by Robert N. Dennis

The town was formed from the Town of Salina in 1848. It is named after James Geddes, a prominent early settler who settled at the head of Onondaga Lake in 1794 and developed the salt industry.

There also was an Old Geddes Village which included part of the west side of Syracuse and Tipperary Hill, the village square being located near St. Mark's Circle. The village of Geddes (incorporated in 1832 and 1837) was annexed to the City of Syracuse on May 20, 1886, with a population of nearly 7,000. Today the town of Geddes still includes the Village of Solvay, which operates independently, and the hamlets of Westvale and Lakeland.

Geddes is the youngest town in Onondaga County.

=== Background ===
Geddes was formed from Salina on March 18, 1848. It lies upon the western bank of Onondaga Lake with level surface in the north and rolling hills in the south. In the southwest of the town, are several isolated, rounded drift hills (or knolls).

The Seneca River forms the north border and Onondaga Creek formed part of the eastern boundary. Nine Mile Creek flows east through the center of town.

The soil is clay and sandy loam. In 1859, the town contained two churches, both Protestant, an Episcopalian and Methodist Episcopalian.

=== Early industry ===
By 1859, several salt wells were located near the southwest extremity of the lake. The S.B.& N.Y.R.R. coal depot was situated on the Erie Canal. In the southeast section of town, there were extensive stone quarries.

There was also a brewery and distillery, and a large number of salt works within the town limits. The population was 950.

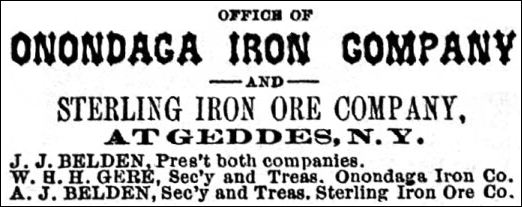
Onondaga Iron Works and Sterling Iron Ore Company in Geddes, New York - Syracuse City Directory, 1879

In 1841, W. H. Farrar, who had recently arrived from Vermont, started a small pottery business in the town of Geddes, New York called Farrar Pottery. During 1868, Farrer sold the business to what later became the Empire Crockery Manufacturing Company.

On July 20, 1871, several local businessmen purchased the struggling local pottery, capitalized the company for $50,000, and expanded its lines to produce ceramic material for table and toilet use. At that time, the name changed to Onondaga Pottery Company (O.P.Co.). The company name was officially changed to Syracuse China in 1966. They specialized in the manufacture of fine china and commercial ware.

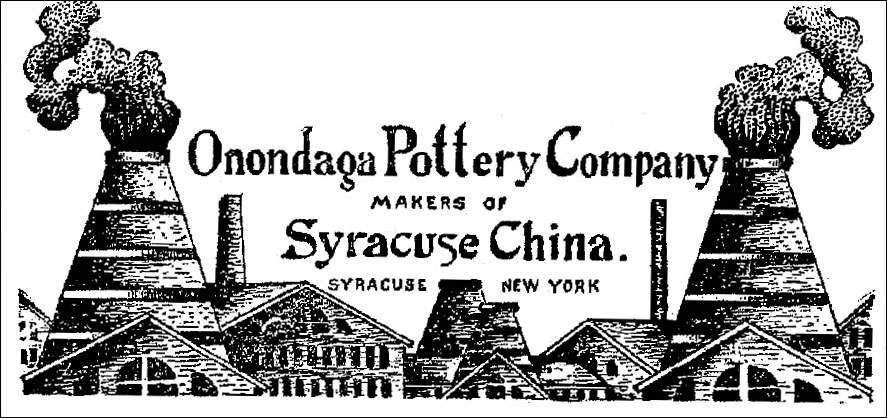
Syracuse China manufactured by Onondaga Pottery in Syracuse, New York - Syracuse Journal, September 12, 1910

During 1874, Ashton Salt Mill was operating in the town of Geddes, on the western edge of the city and Saginaw Salt Works was located southwest of the city in the town of Onondaga. That same year, several other salt producers were operating within the city limits including; G. A. Porter & Company, Haskin's Salt Mill and J. W. Barker & Company.

In 1878, Geddes was the home of Western Coarse Salt Company, Turk's Island Coarse Salt Company, Geddes Coarse Salt Company, Union Coarse Salt Company, Cape Cod Coarse Salt Company, W. & D. Kirkpatrick of No. 7 Wieting Block, Draper & Porter, W. B. Boyd, Mrs. S. O. Ely and J. F. Paige. The Onondaga Coarse Salt Association were manufacturers of coarse or solar salt including; dairy, table, common, fine and fertilizing salts. Thomas K. Gale was president, W. H. H. Gere was vice-president and Lewis A. Hawley was recording secretary.

By 1879, there were several manufacturers in the town including Onondaga Iron Works and Sterling Iron Ore Company both operated by J. J. Belden, president. W. H. H. Gere and A. J. Belden were secretary and treasurer of the companies.

=== Institutions ===
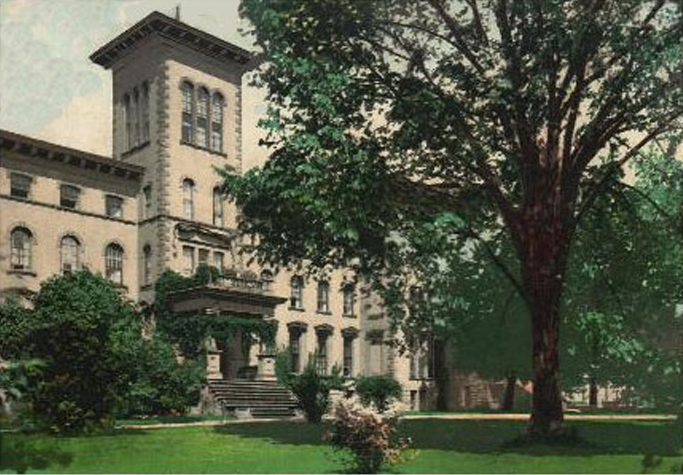
Syracuse Idiot Asylum on Wilbur Avenue in Syracuse, New York in 1906

The New York State Asylum for Idiots was located in the eastern section of town, near the original border with Syracuse on Geddes Street. The facility was located on Wilbur Avenue on the southeast border of Tipperary Hill. The site selected was about a mile southwest of Syracuse, in the town of Geddes, and was "one of the finest that could have been found in the State of New York." The building was constructed of brick, "plain but substantial, and admirably fitted for the purpose for which it is designed."

The institution was located upon the eastern slope of the range of hills in the western part of the city and about 1 1/2 miles south of the head of Onondaga Lake. The asylum grounds covered an area of about sixty-five acres, immediately adjacent to Burnet Park, the most of which was high land, overlooking the city and lake. The principal group of buildings, which were clustered around the original structure, facing the western extremity of Seymour Street, accommodated about 450 individuals.

== Geography ==
According to the United States Census Bureau, the town has a total area of 12.2 square miles (32 km^{2}), of which 9.2 square miles (24 km^{2}) is land and 3.0 square miles (7.8 km^{2}) (24.28%) is water.

Geddes is on the western shore of Onondaga Lake.

Interstate 690 intersects both New York State Route 695 and Interstate 90 (New York State Thruway) in Geddes. New York State Route 5, West Genesee Street, is an east–west highway in the town. New York State Route 297 is a short north–south highway.

== Demographics ==
Historical population
Census	Pop.	Note	%±
1850	2,011		—
1860	2,528		25.7%
1870	4,505		78.2%
1880	7,088		57.3%
1890	1,571		−77.8%
1900	4,387		179.2%
1910	5,959		35.8%
1920	7,995		34.2%
1930	10,210		27.7%
1940	11,237		10.1%
1950	13,284		18.2%
1960	19,679		48.1%
1970	21,032		6.9%
1980	18,528		−11.9%
1990	17,677		−4.6%
2000	17,740		0.4%
2010	17,118		−3.5%
2020	17,088		−0.2%
U.S. Decennial Census

As of the census of 2000, there were 17,740 people, 7,262 households, and 4,807 families residing in the town. The population density was 1,920.3 inhabitants per square mile (741.4/km^{2}). There were 7,620 housing units at an average density of 824.8 per square mile (318.5/km^{2}). The racial makeup of the town was 97.06% White, 0.48% African American, 0.57% Native American, 0.55% Asian, 0.03% Pacific Islander, 0.17% from other races, and 1.12% from two or more races. Hispanic or Latino of any race were 1.51% of the population.

There were 7,262 households, out of which 29.0% had children under the age of 18 living with them, 50.7% were married couples living together, 11.7% had a female householder with no husband present, and 33.8% were non-families. 29.5% of all households were made up of individuals, and 16.1% had someone living alone who was 65 years of age or older. The average household size was 2.40 and the average family size was 2.97.

In the town, the population was spread out, with 23.3% under the age of 18, 6.4% from 18 to 24, 25.5% from 25 to 44, 23.1% from 45 to 64, and 21.7% who were 65 years of age or older. The median age was 42 years. For every 100 females, there were 86.8 males. For every 100 females age 18 and over, there were 82.3 males.

The median income for a household in the town was $41,852, and the median income for a family was $51,609. Males had a median income of $40,688 versus $26,575 for females. The per capita income for the town was $20,986. About 6.7% of families and 8.2% of the population were below the poverty line, including 12.9% of those under age 18 and 7.0% of those age 65 or over.

== Communities and locations in Geddes ==
- Lakeland – A hamlet in the northwestern part of Geddes.
- Lakeside – A location north of Lakeland.
- Lindbergh Lawns – A location in the northern part of the town.
- Solvay – The Village of Solvay is in the southeastern part of Geddes.
- Westvale – A hamlet south of Solvay.

== Notable people ==
- John Mannion (born 1968), U.S. representative, former New York state senator
- Ellen Mitchell (1838–1920), philosopher
