= Empire Expo Center =

Exposition ground in New York

- Interactive map of Empire Expo Center
- Address: 581 State Fair Blvd
- Location: Syracuse, New York
- Coordinates: 43.074°N 76.221°W
- Owner: New York State Department of Agriculture and Markets
- Type: Fairground

Construction
- Opened: 1890

Website
- Official website

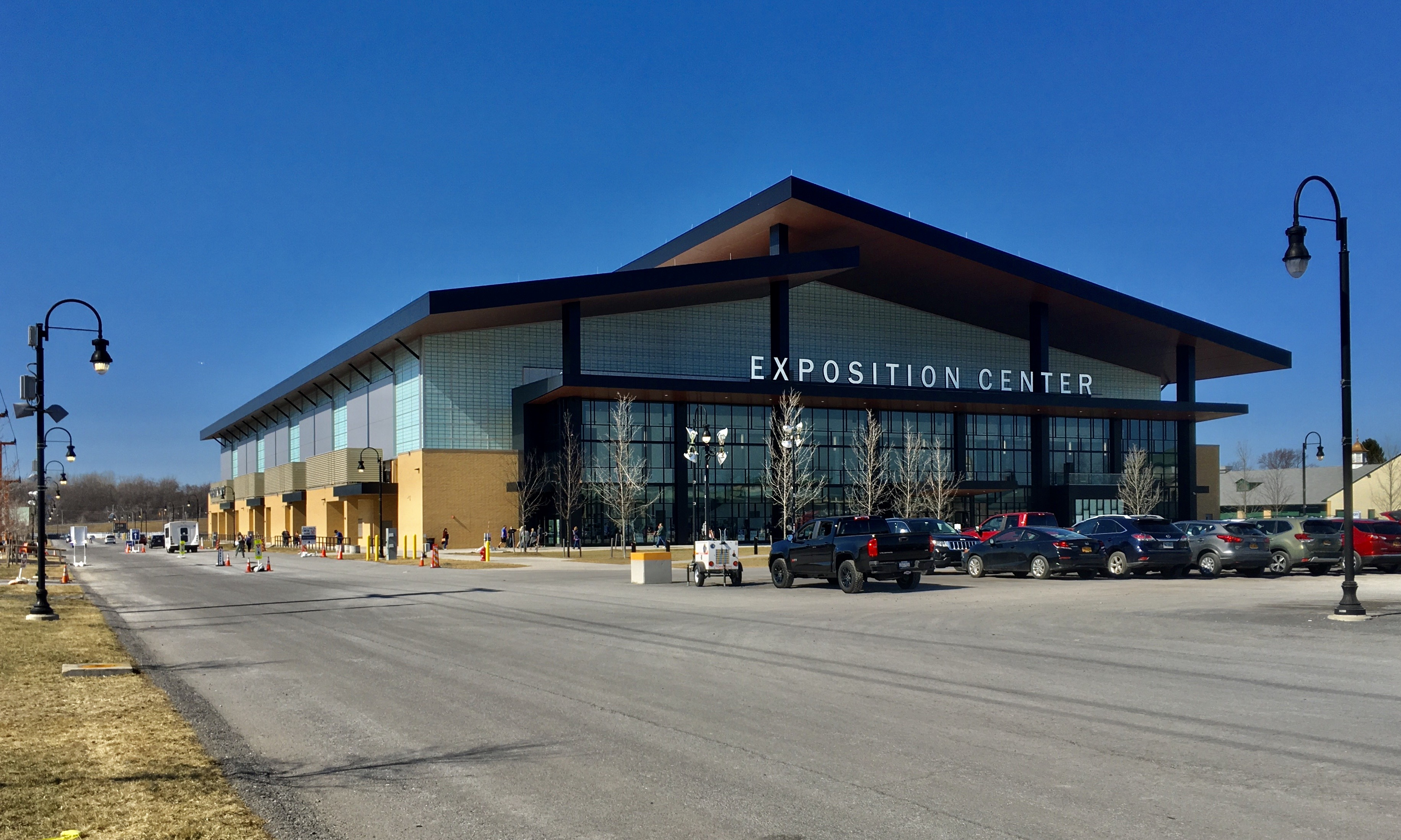

The Empire Expo Center (also known as the New York State Fairgrounds) is an exhibition ground located in Geddes, a suburb of Syracuse, New York. It features eight exhibition halls and 375 acres (1.52 km^{2}) of ground space, which are used year-round for exhibitions and trade fairs.

Its major annual event is the Great New York State Fair which draws approximately one million visitors during its 13-day run, and the entire complex is often referred to as the Fairgrounds. Its name comes from the nickname of New York State, "The Empire State".

== Overview ==
The 375-acre (1.52 km^{2}) fairgrounds complex, with 110 permanent buildings including the 1923 Coliseum and the Exposition Center, operates year-round and hosts about 200 other events a year. These range from major entertainment and sporting events to a variety of equestrian competitions, consumer shows, community events, and meetings.

=== History ===
February 1832, The New York State Agricultural Society was founded in Albany by a group of farmers, legislators, and others to promote agricultural improvement and local fairs. Between 1842 and 1889, the fair traveled among 11 cities: Albany, Auburn, Buffalo, Elmira, New York City, Poughkeepsie, Rochester, Saratoga Springs, Syracuse, Utica, and Watertown.

In September 1890, the Syracuse Land Company donated a 100-acre (0.40 km^{2}) tract of land in Geddes to the Agricultural Society. Crossed by railways that facilitated exhibit transport, the Onondaga County location became the fair's permanent home. In the late 1890s, The Agricultural Society turned to state government for relief from debt due to the construction of permanent buildings on the site. The state purchased the grounds in 1899, and assumed management of the fair the next year, creating an 11-member State Fair Commission appointed by the governor.

A $2-million long-term building plan was enacted in 1908, which would last for two decades. During this time, the Manufacturers and Liberal Arts Building, now the Center of Progress Building, was constructed. It was joined by the Dairy Products Building and Grange Building (now the Science & Industry Building) in 1910.

During the Great War, the fairgrounds were utilized for military training beginning in May 1917, being designated Camp Syracuse; it trained about 40,000 Soldiers, and was impacted by the Spanish flu in 1918, and closed as a military base in November 1918. The Coliseum was opened in 1923, initially serving as host to the World's Dairy Congress.

The fairgrounds were used as a military base during World War II between 1942 and 1947; during this period, no fair was held.

=== Transformation ===
Governor Andrew Cuomo announced a transformation of the Fairgrounds in 2015 that included a redesign of the Fairgrounds that included taking out what was previously the 17,000 seat Grandstand and mile-long dirt track which hosted the State Fair Championship auto race from 1949 to 2003. This marked the first major transformation the Fairgrounds had seen in 100 years.

The track, known as the "Moody Mile," was among the oldest auto racing tracks in the country. In 1938 it and Indianapolis were the only sites of championship Indy car races, and for decades it was the home of Super DIRT Week, which later moved to Oswego. A 1911 crash there, when a car went into the crowd, killed 11 people, one of the worst disasters in American racing. The grandstand was imploded in 2016, the first step in removing the track. The rebuilding added the Exposition Center, which opened in 2018.

The transformation included rebuilding the main gate, making it reminiscent of the 1840 carriage entrance. Various other technological and accessibility additions were made.

The midway received a new layout that now included 15 acres. The Midway's new asphalt pad is the size of over 10 football fields with more room and a better layout for rides and attractions. Improvements include a Kiddieland area, phone charging stations, shaded rest areas, and underground electric/water/sewer for vendors.

A new Empire RV Park was added, including 313 RV sited, fully equipped with sewer, electric, and water hookups. Features include a new grid layout, camera, blue light systems, and online reservations.

The redesign also included preserving the Historic Quad which includes five of the oldest buildings around an open park setting. Commercial vendors were removed from the Quad to restore the park as a relaxing space to gather and rest, with more seating and better signage.

A new curbed median was added along Hiawatha Street with trees, shrubs, and new lighting.

A new entrance along Bridge Street, Gate 11A, ties in with the larger Onondaga Lake West Revitalization Project. Pedestrians can access Gate 11A via a new walkway and viewing platform leading past the Historic Quad to the Crossroads.

In 2016, Governor Cuomo appointed a Task Force to determine how an additional $50 million for Phase Two of the Fairgrounds would be spent.

== Venues ==
- Toyota Coliseum, Capacity 7,500

Originally known as the "State Fair Coliseum" until 2015, the venue is an indoor multipurpose arena. It was formerly the home of the Syracuse Nationals. It is now used for agricultural shows and the Tigris Shrine Circus. The Syracuse Stars hockey team played their games in the Coliseum and won the Calder Cup in the Inaugural Season of (what is now) the American Hockey League. The Midstate Stampede, a youth hockey team, also played in the Coliseum until the ice was removed around 2013. The Syracuse Hornets also played at the Coliseum, but due to financial troubles, the team folded after only 10 games.

The Coliseum was the original home of the Syracuse Nationals (now Philadelphia 76ers) professional basketball team.

- Lakeview Amphitheater, Capacity, 17,500

Completed in 2015, it replaced the Mohegan Sun Grandstand as the primary concert venue.

- Mohegan Sun Grandstand, Capacity: 17,000

Formerly known as the "New York State Fair Grandstand" until 2006. It was the main concert venue for the Great New York State Fair. In 2016, the grandstand was demolished.

- Chevy Court, Capacity: 2,500-35,000

Formerly known as "Cole Muffler Court". A festival setting stage that hosts free concerts during the fair. The venue underwent a $4 million renovation in 2016, which included new seating, landscaping and a bigger stage to draw big-name acts. Concerts will be organized by Live Nation Entertainment.

- Empire Theater

Theatre used for local acts, recitals, pageants and film screenings.

- Regional Artist Variety Stage

Formerly known as the "Special Events Stage", the stage hosts a variety of free entertainment spanning from comedy shows to music acts. All performers are from the New York State area.

- Grange Stage

Features country music acts, line dancers and cloggers.

- Dairyland Stage

A small stage located in the Dairy Products building, providing an "open mic" for amateur acts.

== Events ==
The Syracuse Nationals classic car show draws nearly 80,000 people to its weekend event at the fairgrounds. The fairgrounds hosts more than 40 horse events each year. In 2015, 65 trade and consumer shows brought nearly 400,000 people to the fairgrounds. A total of 50 entertainment events ranging from major rock concerts to theater pipe organ concerts attracted 133,235 people.

Annual events include:

- Great New York State Fair
- Syracuse International Horse Show
- Syracuse Jewelry & Mineral Show
- Syracuse Nationals (car show)
- New York State Boer Goat Show
- Autumn in New York Horse Show
- Salt City Autumn Antique Show
- The Great New York State Train Fair
- Syracuse Construction Career Day Fair

== See also ==
Syracuse Mile
