= New York State Fair =

Official state fair of New York

Coordinates: 43.074°N 76.221°W

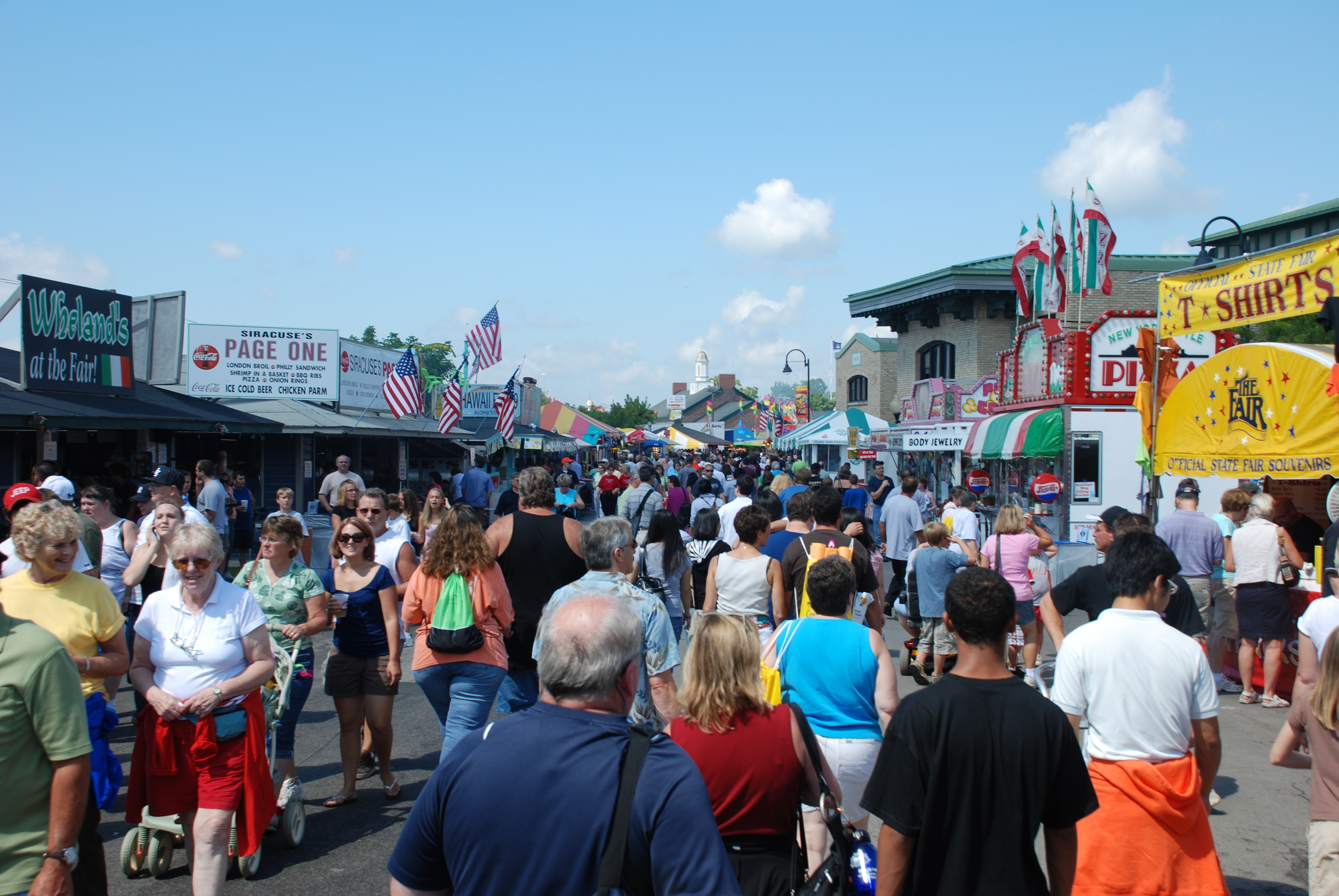
- The fair in 2008
- Status: Active
- Genre: State Fair
- Begins: Second Wednesday before Labor Day
- Ends: Labor Day
- Frequency: Annual
- Locations: Empire Expo Center; 581 State Fair Blvd; Syracuse, New York 13209
- Years active: 185
- Inaugurated: September 29, 1841
- Founder: New York State Agricultural Society
- Attendance: 962,795 (2026)
- Website: nysfair.ny.gov

The New York State Fair, also known as the Great New York State Fair, is a 13-day showcase of agriculture, entertainment, education, and technology. The first fair took place in Syracuse in 1841, and took permanent residence there in 1890. It was the first state fair in the United States. Attendance first topped one million in 2016 and reached a record 1,329,275 in 2019; the 2026 fair drew 962,795 visitors.

The New York State Fair begins in August and runs for 13 days, ending on Labor Day. The Fair did not operate in 2020 due to the COVID-19 pandemic.

It is held at the 375-acre (152 ha) Empire Expo Center on the shores of Onondaga Lake, in the town of Geddes, near the western border of Syracuse. The New York State Department of Agriculture and Markets owns five of the buildings at the fair and employs its workers.

== History ==
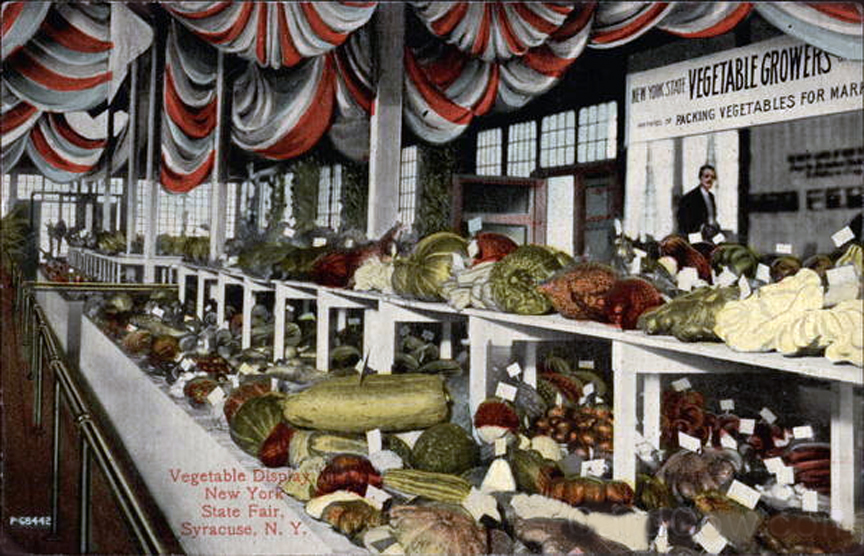
Vegetables on display at the 1900 New York State Fair

In February 1832, The New York State Agricultural Society was founded in Albany by a group of farmers, legislators, and others to promote agricultural improvement and local fairs. The nation's first state fair was later held in Syracuse from September 29–30, 1841. Attendance was estimated at 10,000–15,000; features included speeches, animal exhibits, a plowing contest, and samples of manufactured farm and home goods. The second New York State Fair was held in Albany in 1842. Between 1842 and 1889, the fair traveled among 11 cities: Albany, Auburn, Buffalo, Elmira, New York City, Poughkeepsie, Rochester, Saratoga Springs, Syracuse, Utica, and Watertown.

In September 1890, the Syracuse Land Company donated a 100-acre (0.40 km^{2}) tract of land in Geddes to the Agricultural Society. Crossed by railways that facilitated exhibit transport, the Onondaga County location became the fair's permanent home.

The fair was re-branded as the New York State Agricultural and Industrial Exposition in 1938, reflecting closer ties to industry, and included an extended 14-day schedule featuring various entertainment acts.

During World War II between 1942 and 1947, no fair was held. A truncated fair returned in 1948, followed the next year by a six-day, full-scale exposition, with large crowds. By the end of the 1950s, the fair had expanded to nine days and achieved an attendance of over 500,000. The James E. Strates Midway was added during this time, with nationally known entertainers to attract families and teenagers. In 1967, the 1925 Mighty Wurlitzer Theatre Pipe Organ was installed in the Empire Theatre of the Art & Home Center.

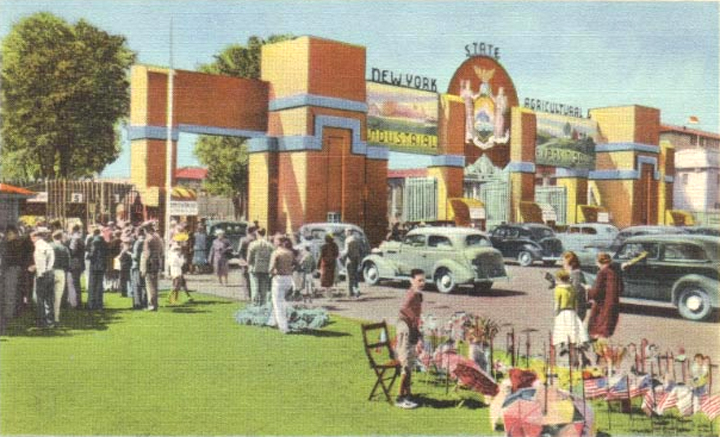
Postcard showing the New York State Exposition's main entrance in the 1940s.

Between 1962 and 1966, the fair was officially known as New York State Exposition, before being named the New York State Fair in 1967.

The fair expanded to 10 days in 1978, and the buildings at the fairgrounds began to be rented during the off-season. The fair expanded to 12 days in 1990. During the 1980s and 1990s, fair officials responded to criticism of slim minority presence by adding gospel festivals and a Pan-African village display. Sign language interpreters were also added, and the grounds were made accessible to people with disabilities.

On September 7, 1998, the fair closed one day early for the first time, due to the Syracuse Labor Day derecho. Two of the storm's three deaths occurred on the fairgrounds.

In 2009, the Industrial Exhibit Authority, a New York state public-benefit corporation that owned 5 of the buildings at the New York State Fair and employed its workers, was disbanded by the New York State Senate and its workers and buildings were transferred to the New York State Department of Agriculture and Markets.

In 2008, fair administration began to focus more on agriculture, with exhibits showcasing products made in New York State, such as the Pride of New York Marketplace and a permanent maple exhibit. The fair changed its Chevy Court format to include two performers each day in 2009. The Syracuse Crunch hosted the first outdoor game in American Hockey League history on February 20, 2010 at the Fairgrounds and set a league attendance record with 21,508 fans. A record of 206,000 fairgoers attend Chevy Court concerts during the 12 day run in 2010.

A $50 million transformation of the Fairgrounds, the first major renovation the Fairgrounds had seen in over 100 years, was announced on January 21, 2015.

The Fair's previous 2001 attendance record was broken on September 5, 2016, with 1,117,630 Fairgoers visiting the Fair. The 2016 Fair also broke three attendance records and had four days exceeding 100,000 attendees.

In 2017 the Fair's duration was lengthened to 13 days.

Chevy Court's most recent attendance record was set on a Sunday, September 2, 2018, with roughly 40,000 people attending a performance by the A boogie Wit Da Hoodie.

On July 6, 2020, it was announced that the fair would be cancelled for 2020 due to the COVID-19 pandemic. The Fair resumed in 2021, lengthened to 18 days. The following year it returned to its previous 13 day format.

== Entertainment ==
=== Chevy Court ===
Chevy Court is an open-air concert theater. In 2009, the fair changed its format to feature two national performing artists every day, rather than having the same artist perform twice on the same date, in order to attract additional people to the fair with acts appealing to different audiences. Chevy Court performances attracted an estimated 150,000 people in 2009 and more than 170,000 in 2010 and over 200,000 in 2011. The stage has hosted Lady Antebellum, Bruno Mars, REO Speedwagon, and many others.

=== Midway ===
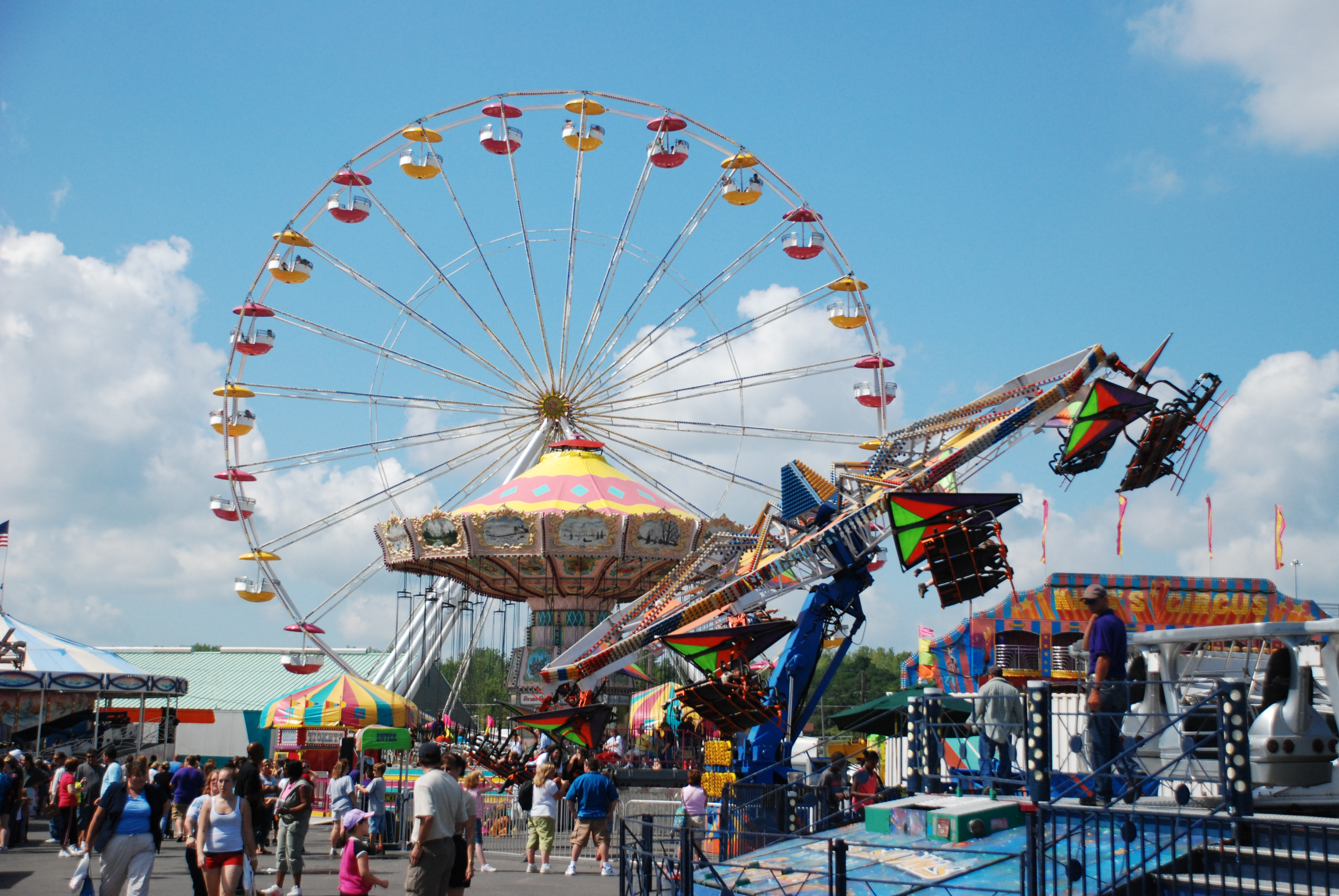
Amusement rides on the Midway.

The Midway features several rides, funhouses, games, and concession stands. The 2014 Fair brought the first new midway to the Fair in over 70 years, provided by Wade Shows. This change brought new rides, concession stands, and games to the fair. In addition to the Midway is the Kiddie Midway, which features rides and games for younger fairgoers. Approximately 100 rides are located in both the Midway and Kiddie Midway.

== Attractions ==
=== Agriculture ===
In 2011, the fair had over 14,000 animals entered to be exhibited including horses, dairy cattle, rabbits, and dairy goats. In addition to animal entries, 2014 brought in over 10,000 agricultural entries including antique tractors, beverages, Christmas trees, flowers, forage, grain, and 4-H.

The fair also aims to promote New York-grown products and foods. In 2008, the "Pride of New York Marketplace" occupied a permanent structure at the main entrance to the fairgrounds, selling various goods and foods produced in New York state.

In 2013, the fair brought a new attraction to allow Fairgoers to sample products from vendors in all regions of the state in the "Taste NY" tent. Each day, up to a dozen food and beverage vendors would offer samples of their products.

=== Buildings and exhibits ===
==== Center of Progress Building ====
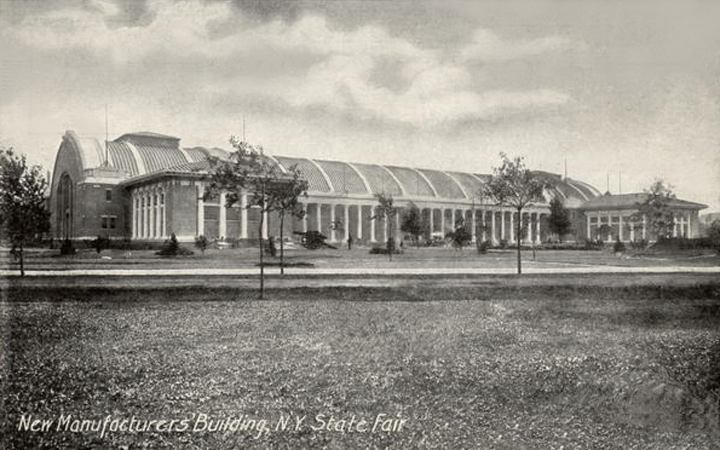
View of the Manufacturers Building (now the Center of Progress Building) shortly after its completion

The Center of Progress Building is one of the largest of the 110 buildings on the fairgrounds. The building is located just inside the fair's main gate, along the perimeter of Chevy Court. This building hosts up to 250 vendors and concessionaires and was previously the home of the fair's 180-ton sand sculpture until 2018 when the sand sculpture was moved to the new Exposition Center.

===== Sand sculpture =====
The Exposition Center contains the 180-ton sand sculpture, which is constructed throughout the 13 days of the fair. Past sand sculpture themes have included The Beatles, Syracuse University, USS New York, Dr. Seuss, and The Olympics.

==== Coliseum ====
The State Fair Coliseum was built in 1923 and its first event was the World's Dairy Congress. Five thousand people came to see Dairy cattle from 40 countries. In 1947–48 Syracuse University basketball team held their games there and in 1949–1952 the NBA Syracuse Nats called this home. The 1949 game set several records, including the most points, most fouls, most free throws, most missed free throws, most overtimes, and longest game.

During the fair, the Coliseum is used mainly for the multi-breed horse shows which include breeds such as Pintos, Arabians, Miniature horses, Quarter horses, Morgan, and Appaloosas, hunter/jumpers as well as the draft breeds and the heavy and light horse pulls. This arena also accommodates the Holstein Dairy Cattle Show on dairy day, the 4-H agility dog show, and multiple other shows on Labor Day.

The Syracuse Stars hockey team played their games in the Coliseum and won the Calder Cup in the Inaugural Season of (what is now) the American Hockey League. The Midstate Stampede, a youth hockey team, also played in the Coliseum until the ice was removed around 2013. The Syracuse Hornets also played at the Coliseum, but due to financial troubles, the team folded after only 10 games.

==== Haudenosaunee Village ====
To address a growing and nostalgic public interest in local history, the Iroquois village exhibit and an agricultural museum were opened in 1928.

==== Horticulture Building ====
This building is located in proximity to the fair's veterans' memorials and the 9-11 memorials. During the fair, it hosts many horticultural exhibits and concessionaires such as a baked potato booth, the New York Maple Center, and produce, flower, and apple exhibits. A wide variety of additional events are held at the building throughout the year. It includes the fair's New York Café, which operates during the fair and selected events.

==== Dairy Products Building ====
The Dairy Products Building is family-oriented and contains attractions such as the butter sculpture, and a Milk Bar serving multiple varieties of milk. In 2012, 403,189 cups of milk were sold to fairgoers, breaking an all-time record at the New York State Fair. Other attractions include Dairy Princesses, entertainment on center stage, and samples of various dairy products.

===== Butter sculpture =====
Located in the center of the Dairy Products Building is the rotating butter sculpture, comprising 800 pounds (360 kg) of unsalted butter. The sculpture has been a feature at the fair since 1969. Once the fair is over, the butter is converted to biofuel to fuel college buses by students of the State University of New York College of Environmental Science and Forestry in Syracuse. The butter sculpture is sponsored by the American Dairy Association and Dairy Council.

==== Dairy Cattle Barn ====
During the fair, the Dairy Cattle Barn is used by dairy cattle exhibitors. During the offseason, it is utilized as an exhibit building and hosts many trade shows for the public and for various industrial groups.

==== Science & Industry Building ====
This century-old structure serves as an anchor for Chevy Court. During the fair, the building hosts a variety of health and safety-related exhibitions.

==== Art & Home Center ====
The Art & Home Center hosts a demonstration kitchen, which has been the host of several celebrity cooking demonstrations by such chefs as Adam Richman, Bobby Flay, and Mario Batali. The Art & Home Center is the hub of all culinary, art, and craft exhibitions, with various New York artists displaying photography, woodworking, quilting, needlework, and the fine arts. Each year, the Art & Home Center hosts its annual Women's Day Luncheon. In 2009, the building celebrated its 75th anniversary by celebrating the life of suffragette Harriet May Mills, whom the building is dedicated to. The building also hosts a display of operating model trains and circus trains during each year's fair. In 1966 the Empire State Theatre & Musical Instrument Museum was established featuring an extensive collection of pianos, organs, phonographs, vintage motion picture projectors, and movie palace artifacts, many of which are on permanent display.

The Art & Home Center contains the Empire Theatre. In addition to being home to local theatrical productions meetings and seminars, the theatre is home to a 1925 Wurlitzer Co. 3 manual 11 rank theatre pipe organ, opus 1143, which was moved from the RKO Keiths Theatre in downtown Syracuse in 1966.

==== International Building ====
The International Building features various international concessions. In 2010, the International Building was redesigned to feature more seating and a new New York Beer and Wine Pub. In 2015, the International Building added a new Vegan and Vegetarian vendor.

==== Youth Building ====
An educational building for youth and families attending the fair. Upstairs serves as a dormitory for 4-H and FFA youth that are competing at the fair. There are 800 beds, lockers, full shower/bathroom facilities, and laundry. Downstairs has a variety of interactive sections for the youth to participate in, including a newsroom, demo kitchen, animal husbandry, crafts, and GPS mapping.

==== State Park at the Fair ====
Located within the fairgrounds is the one-acre (0.40 ha) "State Park at the Fair", billed as the smallest park operated by the New York State Office of Parks, Recreation and Historic Preservation. The park was first opened in 1974 during celebrations marking the 50th anniversary of the New York State Council of Parks. The facility is located in front of the Horticulture Building and aims to recreate a park-like setting within the fair, including a visitor center, gift shop, picnic tables, reflecting pool and mini-golf course. Exhibits within the park demonstrate features and activities available at New York's state parks and historic sites; additional exhibits have included live birds of prey and boating safety demonstrations.

== Attendance records ==
Day	Attendance	Year
Day 1 (Wednesday)	74,027	2019
Day 2 (Thursday)	86,353	2018
Day 3 (Friday)	98,238	2019
Day 4 (Saturday)	127,394	2018
Day 5 (Sunday)	123,206	2017
Day 6 (Monday)	103,842	2019
Day 7 (Tuesday)	102,098	1972
Day 8 (Wednesday)	112,774	1972
Day 9 (Thursday)	112,409	2018
Day 10 (Friday)	124,172	2019
Day 11 (Saturday)	147,749	2019*
Day 12 (Sunday)	119,726	1985
Day 13 (Labor Day)	125,748	2018
Total attendance	1,329,275	2019

* All-time one-day record

== New York State Fairgrounds ==
The 375-acre (1.52 km^{2}) fairgrounds complex, with 110 permanent buildings including the 1923 Coliseum and the Exposition Center, operates year-round and hosts about 200 other events a year. These range from major entertainment and sporting events to a variety of equestrian competitions, consumer shows, community events, and meetings.

In the late 1890s, The Agricultural Society turned to state government for relief from debt due to the construction of permanent buildings on the site. The state purchased the grounds in 1899, and assumed management of the fair the next year, creating an 11-member State Fair Commission appointed by the governor.

A $2-million long-term building plan was enacted in 1908, which would last for two decades. During this time, the Manufacturers and Liberal Arts Building, now the Center of Progress Building, was constructed. It was joined by the Dairy Products Building and Grange Building (now the Science & Industry Building) in 1910. During the Great War, the fairgrounds were utilized for military training beginning in May 1917, being designated Camp Syracuse; it trained about 40,000 Soldiers, and was impacted by the Spanish flu in 1918, and closed as a military base in November 1918. The Coliseum was opened in 1923, initially serving as host to the World's Dairy Congress.

The fairgrounds were used as a military base during World War II between 1942 and 1947; during this period, no fair was held.

=== Transformation ===
Governor Andrew Cuomo announced a transformation of the Fairgrounds in 2015 that included a redesign of the Fairgrounds that included taking out what was previously the 17,000 seat Grandstand and mile-long dirt track which hosted the State Fair Championship auto race from 1949 to 2003. This marked the first major transformation the Fairgrounds had seen in 100 years. In 2016, Governor Cuomo appointed a Task Force to determine how an additional $50 million for Phase Two of the Fairgrounds would be spent.

The rebuilding added the Exposition Center, which opened in 2018. The redesign also included preserving the Historic Quad which includes five of the oldest buildings around an open park setting. Commercial vendors were removed from the Quad to restore the park as a relaxing space to gather and rest, with more seating and better signage. The midway received a new layout that now included 15 acres. Improvements include a Kiddieland area, phone charging stations, shaded rest areas, and underground electric/water/sewer for vendors.

== See also ==
Syracuse Mile
