= Syracuse metropolitan area =

Syracuse Metropolitan Area
- Metropolitan Statistical Area
- Syracuse, NY Metropolitan Statistical Area
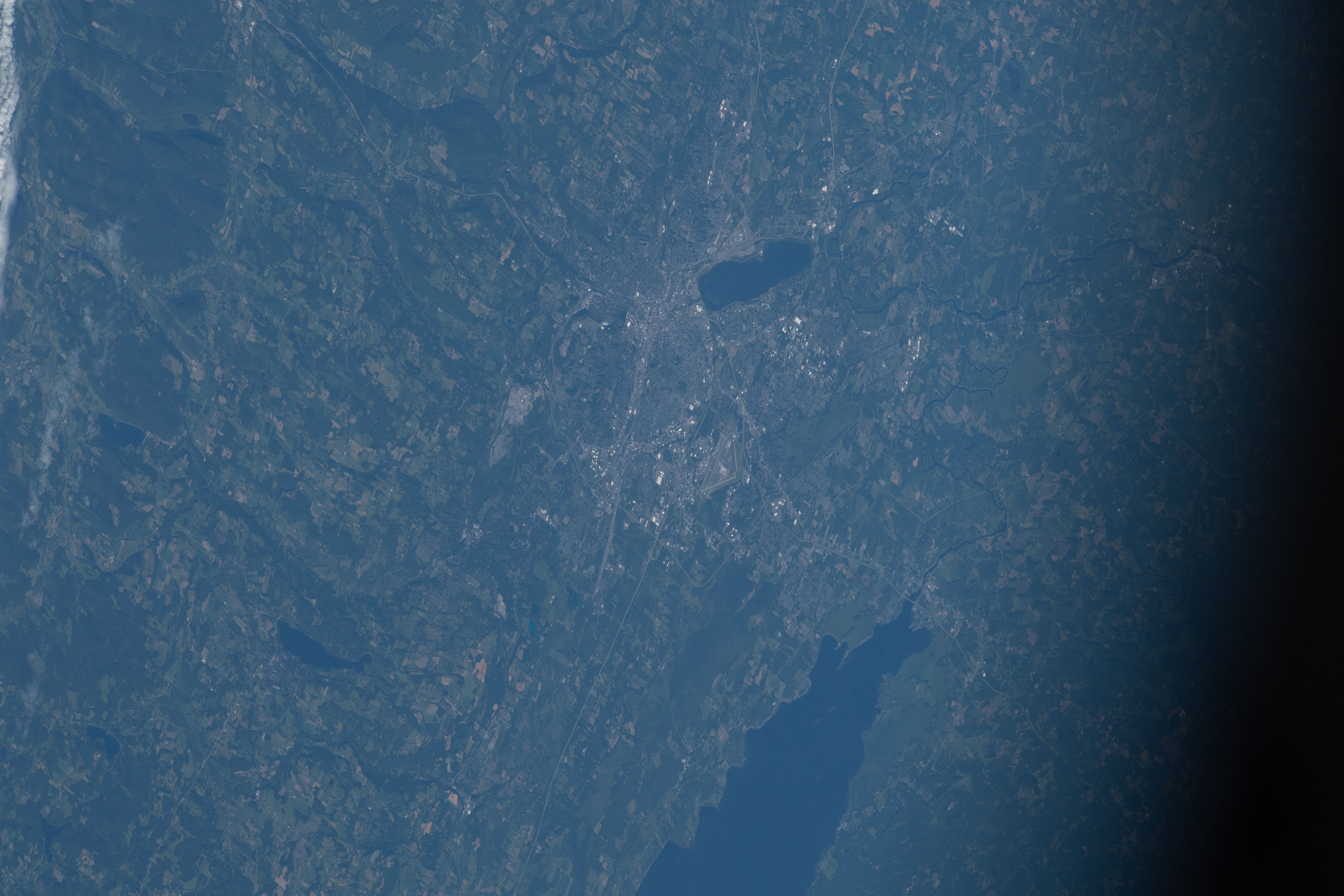
- The Syracuse area at 8:28:52 AM EDT on July 3, 2022, taken during Expedition 67 of the International Space Station. North is oriented to the right.
Syracuse–Auburn, NY CSA
City of Syracuse
Syracuse MSA
Auburn μSA
- Country: United States
- State: New York
- Largest city: Syracuse

Area
  - Total: 2,800 sq mi (7,200 km^{2})

Population (2020)
  - Total: 662,057

GDP
  - Total: $49.281 billion (2022)
- Time zone: UTC-5 (EST)
  - Summer (DST): UTC-4 (DST)

The Syracuse Metropolitan Statistical Area, as defined by the United States Census Bureau, is an area comprising three counties in central New York, with the city of Syracuse as its core. The three counties are Onondaga, Madison, and Oswego. According to the 2020 census, the population of the Syracuse MSA was 662,057; a slight difference from 662,577, in the 2010 census.

== Counties ==
| County | Seat | 2025 Estimate | 2020 Census | Change | Land Area | Density |
|---|---|---|---|---|---|---|
| Onondaga | Syracuse | 466,584 | 476,516 | −2.08% | 778 sq mi (2,020 km^{2}) | 600/sq mi (232/km^{2}) |
| Oswego | Oswego | 118,569 | 117,525 | +0.89% | 952 sq mi (2,470 km^{2}) | 125/sq mi (48/km^{2}) |
| Madison | Wampsville | 67,120 | 68,016 | −1.32% | 655 sq mi (1,700 km^{2}) | 102/sq mi (40/km^{2}) |
| Total | | 652,273 | 662,057 | −1.48% | 2,385 sq mi (6,180 km^{2}) | 273/sq mi (106/km^{2}) |

== Communities ==
=== Places with more than 75,000 inhabitants ===
- Syracuse (Principal city)

=== Places with 25,000 to 75,000 inhabitants ===
- Cicero (town)
- Clay (town)
- DeWitt (town)
- Manlius (town)
- Salina (town)

=== Places with 5,000 to 25,000 inhabitants ===
- Baldwinsville (village)
- Camillus (town)
- Cazenovia (town)
- Constantia (town)
- Elbridge (town)
- Fairmount (census-designated place)
- Fulton (city)
- Geddes (town)
- Granby (town)
- Hamilton (town)
- Hastings (town)
- Lenox (town)
- Lysander (town)
- Marcellus (town)
- Mattydale (census-designated place)
- Mexico (town)
- North Syracuse (village)
- Oneida (city)
- Onondaga (town)
- Oswego (town)
- Oswego (city)
- Pompey (town)
- Richland (town)
- Schroeppel (town)
- Scriba (town)
- Skaneateles (town)
- Solvay (village)
- Sullivan (town)
- Van Buren (town)
- Volney (town)
- Westvale (census-designated place)

=== Places with 1,000 to 5,000 inhabitants ===
- Albion (town)
- Amboy (town)
- Borodino
- Brewerton (census-designated place)
- Bridgeport (census-designated place)
- Brookfield (town)
- Camillus (village)
- Canastota (village)
- Cazenovia (village)
- Central Square (village)
- Chittenango (village)
- Constantia (census-designated place)
- DeRuyter (town)
- East Syracuse (village)
- Eaton (town)
- Elbridge (village)
- Fabius (town)
- Fayetteville (village)
- Fenner (town)
- Galeville (census-designated place)
- Hamilton (village)
- Hannibal (town)
- Jordan (village)
- LaFayette (town)
- Lakeland (census-designated place)
- Lebanon (town)
- Lincoln (town)
- Liverpool (village)
- Lyncourt (census-designated place)
- Madison (town)
- Manlius (village)
- Marcellus (village)
- Mexico (village)
- Minetto (census-designated place)
- Minetto (town)
- Minoa (village)
- Morrisville (village)
- Nedrow (census-designated place)
- Nelson (town)
- New Haven (town)
- Onondaga Reservation
- Orwell (town)
- Otisco (town)
- Palermo (town)
- Parish (town)
- Phoenix (village)
- Pulaski (village)
- Sandy Creek (town)
- Seneca Knolls (census-designated place)
- Skaneateles (village)
- Smithfield (town)
- Spafford (town)
- Stockbridge (town)
- Tully (town)
- Village Green (census-designated place)
- West Monroe (town)
- Williamstown (town)

=== Places with less than 1,000 inhabitants ===
- Altmar (village)
- Boylston (town)
- Cleveland (village)
- DeRuyter (village)
- Earlville (village; partial)
- Fabius (village)
- Georgetown (town)
- Hannibal (village)
- Lacona (village)
- Madison (village)
- Munnsville (village)
- Parish (village)
- Redfield (town)
- Sand Ridge (census-designated place)
- Sandy Creek (village)
- Tully (village)
- Wampsville (village)

=== Hamlets ===
- Cardiff
- Fruit Valley
- Hinmansville
- Jack's Reef
- Jamesville
- Leonardsville
- Memphis
- Messina Springs
- Mottville
- Mycenae
- Onondaga Hill
- Pennellville
- Plainville
- Shepard Settlement
- South Spafford
- Spafford Valley
- Split Rock
- Taunton
- Texas
- West Edmeston (partial)

== Demographics ==
Historical population
| Census | Pop. | Note | %± |
|---|---|---|---|
| 1900 | 168,735 | | — |
| 1910 | 200,298 | | 18.7% |
| 1920 | 241,465 | | 20.6% |
| 1930 | 291,606 | | 20.8% |
| 1940 | 295,108 | | 1.2% |
| 1950 | 341,719 | | 15.8% |
| 1960 | 563,781 | | 65.0% |
| 1970 | 636,507 | | 12.9% |
| 1980 | 642,971 | | 1.0% |
| 1990 | 659,864 | | 2.6% |
| 2000 | 650,154 | | −1.5% |
| 2010 | 662,577 | | 1.9% |
| 2020 | 662,057 | | −0.1% |
U.S. Decennial Census

As of the 2000 census, the Metropolitan Statistical Area (MSA) had a population of 650,154 people, 252,043 households, and 164,202 families residing within the MSA. The racial composition of the MSA was 88.36% White, 6.87% African American, 0.74% Native American, 1.61% Asian, 0.03% Pacific Islander, 0.74% from other races, and 1.65% from two or more races. Hispanic or Latino of any race made up 2.08% of the population.

The median household income in the MSA was $39,210, while the median family income was $47,862. Males had a median income of $35,698, compared to $25,373 for females. The per capita income for the MSA was $19,098.

== Combined Statistical Area ==
The Syracuse–Auburn Combined Statistical Area is made up of four counties in central New York. The statistical area includes one metropolitan area and one micropolitan area.

- Metropolitan Statistical Areas (MSAs)
  - Syracuse (Onondaga, Oswego, and Madison counties)
- Micropolitan Statistical Areas (μSAs)
  - Auburn (Cayuga County)

== Economy ==
Micron Technology is constructing a US$125 billion complex consisting of four megafab memory chip manufacturing buildings in the northern Syracuse suburb of Clay, New York, a project which will create tens of thousands of jobs.

== Sports ==
=== Current teams ===
| Club | Sport | League | Founded | Venue | League titles | Championship years |
|---|---|---|---|---|---|---|
| Syracuse Mets | Baseball | IL | 1934 | NBT Bank Stadium | 8 | 1935, 1942, 1943, 1947, 1954, 1969, 1970, 1976 |
| Syracuse Crunch | Hockey | AHL | 1994 | Upstate Medical University Arena | 0 | N/A |

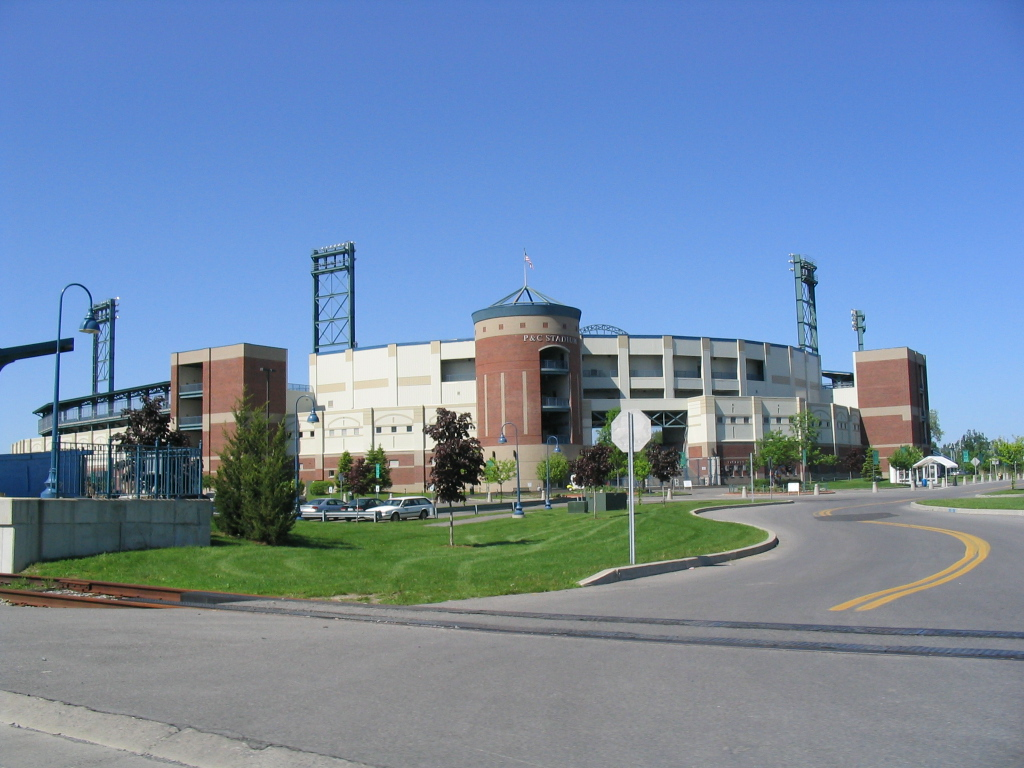
NBT Bank Stadium is home to the Syracuse Mets baseball team.

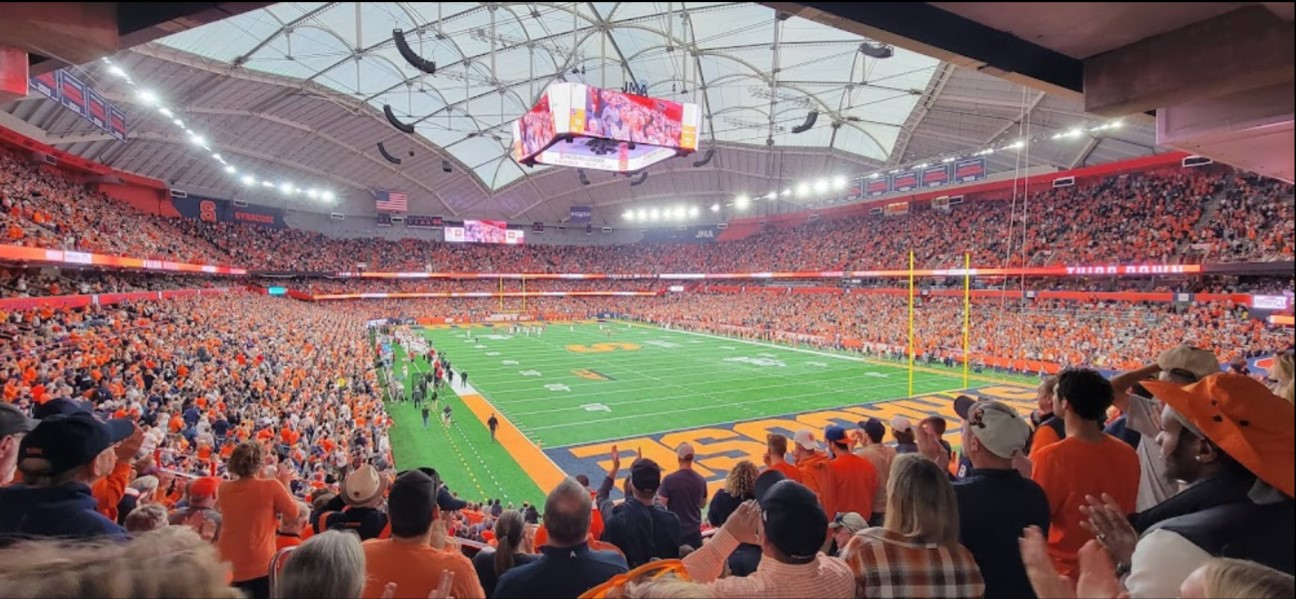
Syracuse University's football team plays its games in the JMA Wireless Dome.

Professional teams in Syracuse include:

- Syracuse Mets (International League affiliate of the New York Mets) Stadium: NBT Bank Stadium
- Syracuse Crunch (American Hockey League affiliate of the Tampa Bay Lightning) Arena: War Memorial at Oncenter

College teams in Syracuse include:

- Syracuse University Orange (NCAA Division I-A) Stadium: JMA Wireless Dome
- Le Moyne College Dolphins (Northeast Conference | NCAA Division I)
- Onondaga Community College Lazers (NJCAA)
- SUNY Environmental Science and Forestry Mighty Oaks (USCAA)

Syracuse University sports are by far the most attended sporting events in the Syracuse area. Basketball games often draw over 30,000 fans, and football games over 40,000. The university has helped develop dozens of famous professional players since starting an athletics program in the late nineteenth century, including all-time greats Jim Brown, Larry Csonka and Dave Bing, and recent professional stars Marvin Harrison, Carmelo Anthony, Dwight Freeney, Jason Hart, and Donovan McNabb. Teams from both sports play in the JMA Dome.

== Colleges and universities ==
- Syracuse
  - Syracuse University
  - SUNY Upstate Medical University
  - SUNY Environmental Science and Forestry
  - SUNY Oswego Metro Center
  - Pomeroy College of Nursing at Crouse Hospital
  - St. Joseph's College of Nursing
- Elsewhere in Onondaga County
  - Le Moyne College in DeWitt
  - Onondaga Community College in Onondaga Hill
  - Bryant & Stratton College has campuses in Liverpool and Syracuse
  - Columbia College has a campus at Hancock Field in Salina
  - Empire State University has a campus in East Syracuse
- Madison County
  - Colgate University in Hamilton
  - Morrisville State College in Morrisville
- Oswego County
  - SUNY Oswego in Fulton, Oswego, and Phoenix

== Notable individuals ==
Several well-known individuals have ties to the Syracuse metropolitan area, including:

- L. Frank Baum – author of The Wonderful Wizard of Oz; born in Chittenango, New York
- Joey Belladonna – singer of heavy metal band Anthrax; born Joseph Belardini in Oswego, New York
- Grover Cleveland – two-term United States President; childhood resident of Fayetteville, New York
- Robin Curtis – actress of Star Trek films, resident of Cazenovia, New York
- Matilda Joslyn Gage – 19th century Fayetteville, New York feminist
- Gym Class Heroes – band from Geneva, New York
- Beezie Madden – Olympic Gold Medal Equestrian Show Jumper, resident of Cazenovia, New York
- Dave Mirra – professional BMX bike rider, former resident of Chittenango, New York
- Jonathan Murray – American television producer, born in Fayetteville, New York
- Eliza Orlins – contestant on Survivor: Vanuatu, Survivor: Micronesia, and The Amazing Race 31
- Leland Stanford – founder of Stanford University; graduate of Cazenovia Seminary
- David Foster Wallace – author, born in Ithaca, New York
- Bobcat Goldthwait – Actor, comedian, screenwriter, and film and television director born and raised in Syracuse
- Tom Kenny – Actor and comedian, voice of SpongeBob SquarePants (character), born and raised in Syracuse
- John Katko – Four-term Congressman from Camillus, New York, serving the 24th Congressional District

== See also ==
- New York census statistical areas
- Timeline of town creation in Central New York
