= List of county routes in Oswego County, New York =

County routes in Oswego County, New York, are signed with the Manual on Uniform Traffic Control Devices-standard yellow-on-blue pentagon route marker. Routes typically have one or more road names in addition to their designation; however, several are known only by their route number.

== Routes 1 to 50 ==
Route	Length (mi)	Length (km)	From	Via	To	Notes
CR 1	10.45	16.82	Oswego city line in Scriba	North Road	NY 104B / CR 43 in New Haven	Part east of CR 6 was formerly part of NY 104B
CR 1A	2.12	3.41	CR 1	Lake Road in Scriba	Lake View Road	
CR 2	16.18	26.04	US 11 in Pulaski	Richland Road	CR 17 in Redfield	
CR 2A	2.07	3.33	NY 13 in Richland	Centerville Road	I-81 exit 36 / CR 2 in Pulaski	
CR 3	6.56	10.56	Dead end at Hannibal village line in Hannibal	Hannibal Street	Fulton city line in Granby	Former routing of NY 3
CR 4	20.80	33.47	Oswego city line in Scriba	Hall Road	US 11 in Hastings	
CR 5	3.91	6.29	Selkirk Lighthouse in Richland	Lake Street	US 11 in Pulaski	
CR 6	18.89	30.40	NY 264 in Schroeppel	Volney Road	North Road in New Haven	Part between NY 104 and CR 1 was formerly part of NY 104B
CR 6A	0.37	0.60	CR 6	Unnamed road in New Haven	North Road & Dempster Beach Drive	
CR 6B	0.11	0.18	Dead end	Unnamed road in Schroeppel	CR 6	
CR 7	13.29	21.39	NY 176 in Hannibal	Johnson Road	NY 104 in Oswego	
CR 8	11.51	18.52	Onondaga County line in Granby (becomes CR 33)	Minetto–Lysander Road	NY 48 in Minetto	
CR 9	1.91	3.07	Fulton city line	Emery Road in Volney	CR 6	
CR 10	7.42	11.94	Onondaga County line (becomes CR 46)	Unnamed road in Schroeppel	NY 49	
CR 11	9.78	15.74	NY 49 in West Monroe	Webb Road	NY 69 in Parish	
CR 12	13.31	21.42	State Street in Phoenix	Lock Street and Phoenix–Caughdenoy and Phoenix roads	CR 32 in Hastings	
CR 12A	0.36	0.58	NY 49 in Central Square	Unnamed road in Central Square	Dead end	
CR 13	6.33	10.19	CR 15	Center Road in Boylston	CR 17	
CR 14	4.94	7.95	Onondaga County line (becomes CR 180)	Ley Creek Road in Granby	NY 176	
CR 15	15.39	24.77	Ouderkirk Road in Sandy Creek	Sandy Pond Road, Lake Street, and Harwood Drive	CR 17 in Boylston	Part between US 11 and CR 50 was designated NY 288 from 1930 to c. 1940
CR 16	3.90	6.28	NY 3 / NY 104 in Mexico village	Academy Street	NY 104B in Mexico	
CR 17	36.57	58.85	NY 49 in Constantia	Unnamed road	Jefferson County line in Boylston (becomes CR 92)	Discontinuous at NY 13; part between NY 13 and CR 47 was formerly part of NY 183
CR 17A	3.11	5.01	NY 69	Leeman Road in Amboy	CR 17	
CR 18	2.29	3.69	CR 45 in Palermo	Unnamed road	CR 4 in Hastings	
CR 19	4.69	7.55	NY 13	Unnamed road in Williamstown	Oneida County line	
CR 20	5.78	9.30	Cayuga County line (becomes CR 96)	California Road and Maple Avenue in Oswego	CR 25	
CR 21	5.16	8.30	Cayuga County line in Hannibal (becomes CR 37A)	Auburn Street	NY 3 in Hannibal village	
CR 22	24.21	38.96	NY 69 in Parish	Cheese Factory Road and Mexico Street	Jefferson County line in Sandy Creek (becomes CR 122)	
CR 22A	3.29	5.29	CR 22 in Lacona	Salisbury and Ellisburg streets	Jefferson County line in Sandy Creek (becomes CR 87)	
CR 23	11.50	18.51	NY 49 in Constantia	Unnamed road	NY 69 / NY 183 in Amboy	
CR 23A	1.62	2.61	CR 23 in Constantia	Unnamed road	CR 26 in West Monroe	
CR 23B	1.88	3.03	CR 26 in West Monroe	Unnamed road	CR 23 in Constantia	
CR 24 (1)	1.39	2.24	CR 25	Worden Road in Minetto	NY 48	
CR 24 (2)	0.29	0.47	CR 24 (segment 1) in Minetto	Minetto Bridge Road	CR 57 in Volney	
CR 25	2.50	4.02	Furniss Road in Minetto	West 5th Street Road	Oswego city line in Oswego	
CR 26	12.36	19.89	CR 11 in West Monroe	Unnamed road	I-81 exit 33 / NY 69 in Parish	
CR 27	3.27	5.26	Oneida County line (becomes CR 70)	Unnamed road in Redfield	CR 17	
CR 28	9.26	14.90	NY 3 in Richland	Tinker Tavern Road	CR 22 in Albion	
CR 29	6.10	9.82	CR 4	Unnamed road in Scriba	Lake Road	
CR 30	8.20	13.20	NY 13 in Williamstown	Unnamed road	CR 22 in Orwell	
CR 30A	0.88	1.42	NY 13	Unnamed road in Williamstown	CR 30	
CR 31	0.75	1.21	Myers Road	Unnamed road in Minetto	CR 24	
CR 32	2.72	4.38	US 11	Unnamed road in Hastings	CR 37	
CR 33	4.82	7.76	Onondaga County line in Schroeppel (becomes CR 50)	Town Line Road	CR 18 in Palermo	
CR 34	1.02	1.64	NY 34 / NY 104 in Hannibal	Cayuga Street	NY 3 in Hannibal village	
CR 35	5.68	9.14	NY 3 in Palermo	Vermilion–New Haven Road	CR 64 in New Haven	
CR 35A	0.83	1.34	CR 35	Unnamed road in Palermo	NY 3	
CR 36	2.62	4.22	CR 7	Unnamed road in Hannibal	CR 21	
CR 37	12.27	19.75	CR 12 in Hastings	Swamp Road	CR 84 in West Monroe	
CR 38	7.83	12.60	US 11 / CR 45 in Hastings	Rider and Railroad streets	NY 104 in Parish	
CR 39	2.20	3.54	CR 27	Unnamed road in Redfield	Lewis County line (becomes CR 44)	
CR 40	1.12	1.80	NY 104B	Unnamed road in Mexico	Dead end	
CR 41	9.10	14.65	NY 104 in Mexico village	North Street	US 11 in Richland	
CR 41A	2.10	3.38	CR 41	Unnamed road in Richland	US 11	
CR 42	1.16	1.87	CR 25	Snell Road in Minetto	NY 48	
CR 43	2.05	3.30	NY 104	Tollgate Road in New Haven	NY 104B / CR 1	
CR 44	1.03	1.66	CR 64	Pleasant Point Road in New Haven	NY 104	
CR 45	18.84	30.32	CR 57 in Volney	Suckerville, Mount Pleasant, and Palermo road	US 11 / CR 38 in Hastings	Section east of NY 3 was designated NY 182 from ca. 1933 to 1935.
CR 45A	1.27	2.04	Dead end	Unnamed road in Volney	CR 45	
CR 45S	0.03	0.05	Dead end	Spur in Volney	CR 57	
CR 46	1.66	2.67	NY 48 in Granby	Unnamed road	CR 57 in Schroeppel	
CR 47	3.86	6.21	CR 17	Unnamed road in Redfield	Lewis County line	
CR 48	10.40	16.74	CR 22 in Albion	Ridge Road	CR 15 / CR 22 in Lacona	
CR 50	6.05	9.74	CR 2 in Orwell	Vorea Road	CR 13 in Boylston	

== Routes 51 and up ==
Route	Length (mi)	Length (km)	From	Via	To	Notes
CR 51	4.14	6.66	CR 6	Jerrett Road in New Haven	NY 104	
CR 51A	2.70	4.35	NY 104 in Scriba	Unnamed road	CR 51 in New Haven	
CR 52	5.77	9.29	CR 22 in Altmar	Bridge Street and Potter Road	CR 2 in Orwell	
CR 53	4.38	7.05	CR 45 in Volney	Kingdom and Broadway roads	NY 104 in Scriba	
CR 54	7.39	11.89	NY 264 in Schroeppel	Pennellville Road	CR 18 in Palermo	
CR 54A	1.99	3.20	NY 264	Godfrey Road in Schroeppel	CR 54	Former number.
CR 55	4.30	6.92	Onondaga County line (becomes CR 127)	Jacksonville Road in Granby	NY 176	
CR 56	0.62	1.00	CR 17	Unnamed road in Amboy	Oneida County line (becomes CR 71)	
CR 57	16.80	27.04	Onondaga County line in Schroeppel (becomes CR 91)	Unnamed road (Main Street within Phoenix)	Oswego city line in Scriba	Formerly part of NY 57; discontinuous at Fulton city limits
CR 57A	1.77	2.85	CR 57	Dunham Road in Schroeppel	CR 12	
CR 58	4.09	6.58	US 11 in Mexico	Standpipe Road	NY 104 in Mexico village	
CR 58A	1.08	1.74	CR 58	Unnamed road in Mexico	NY 104	
CR 59	1.03	1.66	CR 59A	Unnamed road in Schroeppel	NY 264	
CR 59A	0.05	0.08	Dead end	Unnamed road in Schroeppel	CR 59	
CR 60	0.36	0.58	NY 13	South Jefferson Street in Pulaski	US 11	
CR 62	4.20	6.76	CR 5 in Pulaski	North Street	CR 15 in Sandy Creek	
CR 63	0.85	1.37	NY 104	Kocher Road in Scriba	CR 1	
CR 64	4.16	6.69	CR 6 in New Haven	Country Home Road	NY 104 in Mexico village	
CR 65	3.07	4.94	CR 23	Unnamed road in Constantia	CR 17	
CR 84	6.15	9.90	CR 11 in West Monroe	Unnamed road	CR 38 in Hastings	
CR 84A	0.30	0.48	CR 84	Unnamed road in Hastings	Dead end	
CR 85	6.55	10.54	NY 104 in Hannibal	Cunningham Road	NY 48 in Granby	
CR 89	1.79	2.88	NY 104	Washington Boulevard in Oswego	SUNY Oswego	
CR 176	7.14	11.49	Fulton city line in Volney	Whittaker Road	CR 4 in Scriba	Formerly part of NY 176

== See also ==
- County routes in New York
- List of former state routes in New York (101–200)
- List of former state routes in New York (201–300)
