= New York's 120th State Assembly district =

American legislative district

Assemblymember
William Barclay; R–Pulaski

New York's 120th State Assembly district is one of the 150 districts in the New York State Assembly. It has been represented by former Republican Minority Leader William Barclay since 2003. In 2026, he announced that he would not run for re-election.

== Geography ==
=== 2020s ===
District 120 encompasses all of Oswego County and portions of Cayuga and Jefferson counties. It contains the cities of Fulton and Oswego and the towns of New Haven, Amboy, Richland, Albion, Parish, Sandy Creek, Boylston, Mexico, Orwell, Redfield, Williamstown, Constantia, West Monroe, Schroeppel, Hastings, Palermo, Volney, Granby, Hannibal, Scriba, Oswego, Minetto, Ira, Victory, Sterling, Ellisburg, Adams, Lorraine and Worth.

The district is entirely within New York's 24th congressional district and overlaps (partially) with the 49th and 50th districts of the New York State Senate.

=== 2010s ===
This district encompassed most of Oswego County and portions of Onondaga and Jefferson counties. It contains the cities of Fulton and Oswego and the towns of New Haven, Amboy, Richland, Albion, Parish, Sandy Creek, Boylston, Mexico, Orwell, Redfield, Williamstown, Constantia, West Monroe, Schroeppel, Hastings, Palermo, Volney, Granby, Scriba, Ellisburg, and Lysander.

== Recent election results ==
=== 2026 ===
2026 New York State Assembly election, District 120
Primary election
Party	Candidate	Votes	%
Democratic	Timothy Allers	1,116	50.6
Democratic	Jim Cannon	1,088	49.3
Write-in		2	0.1
Total votes		2,206	100.0
General election
Republican	Jim Weatherup		
Conservative	Jim Weatherup		
Total	Jim Weatherup		
Democratic	Timothy Allers		
Write-in			
Total votes			100.0

=== 2024 ===
2024 New York State Assembly election, District 120
Party	Candidate	Votes	%
Republican	William Barclay	41,719	
Conservative	William Barclay	6,831	
Total	William Barclay (incumbent)	49,138	98.8
Write-in		588	1.2
Total votes		49,138	100.0
Republican hold			

=== 2022 ===
2022 New York State Assembly election, District 120
Party	Candidate	Votes	%
Republican	William Barclay	31,975	
Conservative	William Barclay	5,688	
Total	William Barclay (incumbent)	37,663	99.4
Write-in		238	0.6
Total votes		37,901	100.0
Republican hold			

=== 2020 ===
2020 New York State Assembly election, District 120
Party	Candidate	Votes	%
Republican	William Barclay	37,230	
Conservative	William Barclay	4,693	
Independence	William Barclay	1,496	
Total	William Barclay (incumbent)	43,419	70.0
Democratic	Gail Tosh	18,523	29.9
Write-in		50	0.1
Total votes		61,992	100.0
Republican hold			

=== 2018 ===
2018 New York State Assembly election, District 120
Party	Candidate	Votes	%
Republican	William Barclay	26,346	
Conservative	William Barclay	3,551	
Independence	William Barclay	1,312	
Reform	William Barclay	184	
Total	William Barclay (incumbent)	31,393	68.6
Democratic	Gail Tosh	13,315	
Working Families	Gail Tosh	623	
Women's Equality	Gail Tosh	421	
Total	Gail Tosh	14,359	31.4
Write-in		11	0.0
Total votes		45,752	100.0
Republican hold			

=== 2016 ===
2016 New York State Assembly election, District 120
Party	Candidate	Votes	%
Republican	William Barclay	34,744	
Conservative	William Barclay	4,616	
Independence	William Barclay	4,309	
Reform	William Barclay	606	
Total	William Barclay (incumbent)	44,275	99.5
Write-in		208	0.5
Total votes		44,483	100.0
Republican hold			

=== 2014 ===
2014 New York State Assembly election, District 120
Party	Candidate	Votes	%
Republican	William Barclay	20,876	
Conservative	William Barclay	3,465	
Independence	William Barclay	3,384	
Total	William Barclay (incumbent)	27,725	99.3
Write-in		185	0.7
Total votes		27,910	100.0
Republican hold			

=== 2012 ===
2012 New York State Assembly election, District 120
Party	Candidate	Votes	%
Republican	William Barclay	29,116	
Independence	William Barclay	5,780	
Conservative	William Barclay	4,095	
Total	William Barclay (incumbent)	38,991	99.4
Write-in		216	0.6
Total votes		39,207	100.0
Republican hold			
