= Stillwater Bridge =

Stillwater Bridge may refer to:

- Stillwater Bridge (St. Croix River), a lift bridge joining Stillwater, Minnesota and Houlton, Wisconsin
- Stillwater Bridge (Hudson River, New York), a bridge carrying Saratoga-Rensselaer County Roads 125.
- Stillwater Bridge (Salmon River, New York), Stillwater, New York, listed on the NRHP in Oswego County, New York
