= New York State Route 3D =

New York State Route 3D may refer to:

- New York State Route 3D (1931–1932) in central Oswego County
- New York State Route 3D (1932–1935) in Cayuga, Oswego, and Jefferson Counties
