= Holyoke Cottage (Sandy Creek, New York) =

Historic house in New York, United States

- U.S. National Register of Historic Places
- Location within New York Location within the United States
- Nearest city: Sandy Creek, New York
- Coordinates: 43°38′45″N 76°9′56″W
- Area: 19.5 acres (7.9 ha)
- Built: 1900
- Architect: Smith, E.H. & Son
- Architectural style: Bungalow/Craftsman
- MPS: Sandy Creek MRA
- NRHP reference No.: 88002216
- Added to NRHP: November 15, 1988

Holyoke Cottage is a historic home located at Sandy Creek in Oswego County, New York. It was built in 1905–1906 and is a 1 1/2-story bungalow–style summer residence located on a promontory overlooking North Pond. Also on the property is a pump house and dry-laid fieldstone wall.

It was listed on the National Register of Historic Places in 1988.
