= Schroeppel House =

Historic house in New York, United States

- U.S. National Register of Historic Places
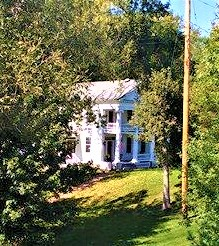

- Location within New York Location within the United States
- Location: Morgan Rd., Schroeppel, New York
- Coordinates: 43°12′20″N 76°13′8″W
- Area: 6.1 acres (2.5 ha)
- Built: 1818
- Architectural style: Greek Revival
- NRHP reference No.: 82003395
- Added to NRHP: September 09, 1982

Schroeppel House is a historic home located in Schroeppel in Oswego County, New York. The original section was built in 1818 and is a Neoclassical-style structure. The principal mass is a three- by four-bay, 2 1/2-story frame house constructed in the style of a prostyle tetrastyle temple. It features a 2-story portico with Ionic columns. The house is currently used as a bed and breakfast called River Edge Mansion.

It was listed on the National Register of Historic Places in 1982.
