= Gertrude Bartlett =

Canadian poet

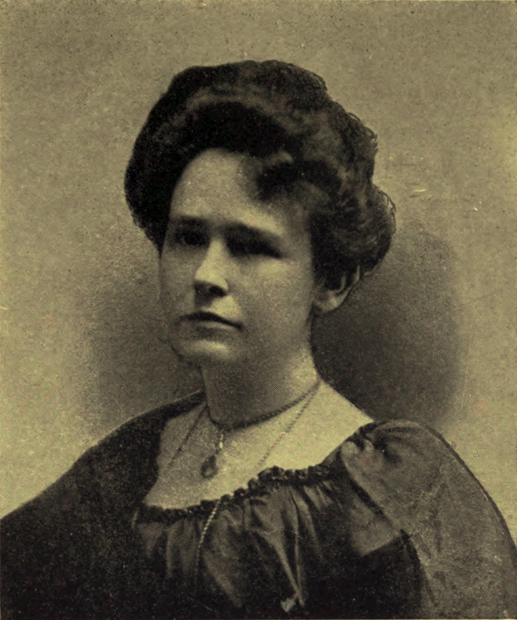
Bartlett in 1916

Gertrude Bartlett (11 April 1868 – 28 September 1942) was a Canadian poet based in Montreal.

== Biography ==
Gertrude Bartlett was born on 11 April 1868 in New Haven, New York to parents William Cheever Bartlett and Mary Bartlett (née Moulton). After receiving her education in New York, she moved to Toronto in 1885 and worked at Macdonald and Marsh, the law firm where Sir John A. Macdonald was senior partner.

Bartlett began writing poetry at the age of eighteen, but published her first book, The White Bird and Other Poems in 1932. The book featured an introduction by Robert Norwood, leading the title poem to earn her the Prix David Poetry Prize. After her book, Gertrude became a regular contributor of poems and stories to the Montreal Gazette.

Four of her poems were included by John Garvin in his 1916 anthology Canadian Poets before her first book was published. Her sonnet The Bride won the Montreal Poetry Contest of the Canadian Authors Association in 1934.

== Publications ==
- Bartlett, Gertrude (1932). The White Bird and Other Poems. Toronto: Macmillan of Canada. OCLC 9222900.
