= Panther Lake (Oswego County, New York) =

Lake in New York, United States

- Location within New York Location within the United States
- Location: Oswego County, New York, United States
- Coordinates: 43°19′33″N 75°54′03″W
- Primary outflows: West Branch Little River
- Basin countries: United States
- Surface area: 122 acres (0.49 km^{2})
- Average depth: 13 feet (4.0 m)
- Max. depth: 25 ft (7.6 m)
- Shore length^{1}: 3 miles (4.8 km)
- Surface elevation: 600 ft (180 m)
- Settlements: Panther Lake, New York
- ^{1} Shore length is not a well-defined measure.

Panther Lake is located near Panther Lake, New York. Fish species present in the lake include pickerel, tiger muskie, brown bullhead, pumpkinseed sunfish, black crappie, largemouth bass, and smallmouth bass. The lake is private. No boat launch is available to the public.
