= Jim Weatherup =

American politician

Member-elect of the New York State Assembly from the 120th district
- Assuming office January 2027
- Succeeding: William A. Barclay

Personal details
- Party: Republican

Jim Weatherup is an American politician. A member of the Republican Party, he is the member-elect for the 120th district of the New York State Assembly.
