= Stillwater Bridge (Salmon River, New York) =

- U.S. National Register of Historic Places
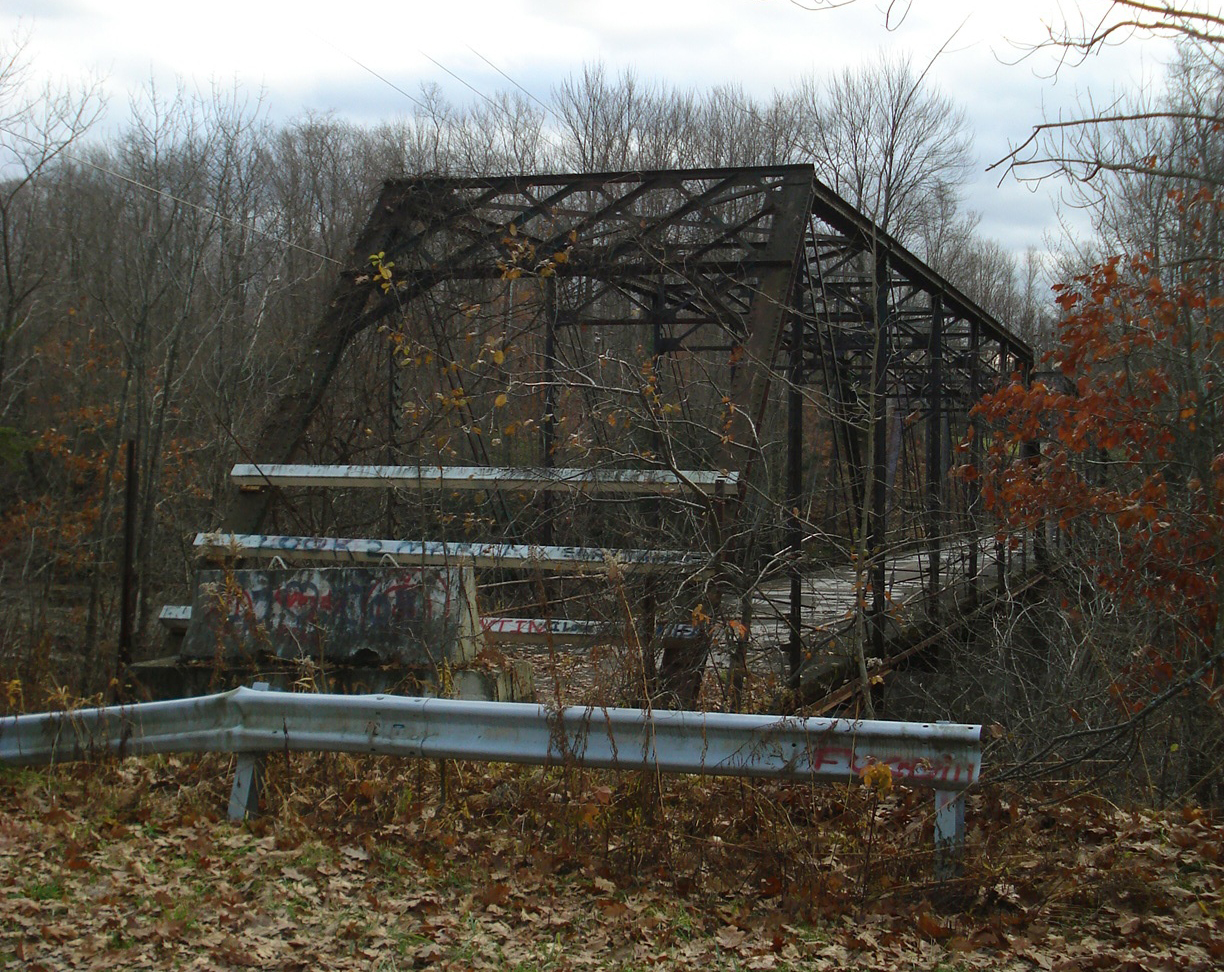
- Stillwater Bridge in November of 2008.

- Location within New York Location within the United States
- Nearest city: Stillwater, New York
- Coordinates: 43°32′41″N 75°55′20″W
- Area: less than one acre
- Built: 1913
- Architect: Penn Bridge Co.; Erie Construction Co.
- Architectural style: Pratt through Truss
- NRHP reference No.: 97001385
- Added to NRHP: November 7, 1997

Stillwater Bridge is a historic Pratt through Truss bridge located at Stillwater in Oswego County, New York. It is a two-span bridge constructed in 1913 and spans the Salmon River. It was constructed by the Penn Bridge Company of Beaver Falls, Pennsylvania.

It was listed on the National Register of Historic Places in 1997.

The bridge was demolished by Oswego County in 2010.
