= New York State Route 104B =

State highway in Oswego County, New York, US

New York State Route 104B
- Map of central New York with NY 104B highlighted in red

Route information
- Auxiliary route of NY 104
- Maintained by NYSDOT
- Length: 6.07 mi (9.77 km)
- Existed: April 1935–present
- Tourist routes: Great Lakes Seaway Trail

Major junctions
- West end: NY 104 in New Haven
- East end: NY 3 in Mexico

Location
- Country: United States
- State: New York
- Counties: Oswego

Highway system
- New York Highways; Interstate; US; State; Reference; Parkways
← NY 104A	→ NY 105

New York State Route 104B (NY 104B) is a 6.07-mile (9.77 km) east–west state highway located in central Oswego County, New York, in the United States. This highway provides a connection between NY 104, the principal highway along the southern shore of Lake Ontario, in New Haven and NY 3, the principal highway along the eastern shore of Lake Ontario, in the town of Mexico. It passes through mostly rural areas and acts as a two-lane bypass of the village of Mexico, located where NY 3 and NY 104 intersect southeast of NY 104B. All of NY 104B is part of the Seaway Trail, a National Scenic Byway. The route was originally New York State Route 3D in 1930. NY 3D was redesignated as New York State Route 3E c. 1932, and was redesignated NY 104B in April 1935.

== Route description ==
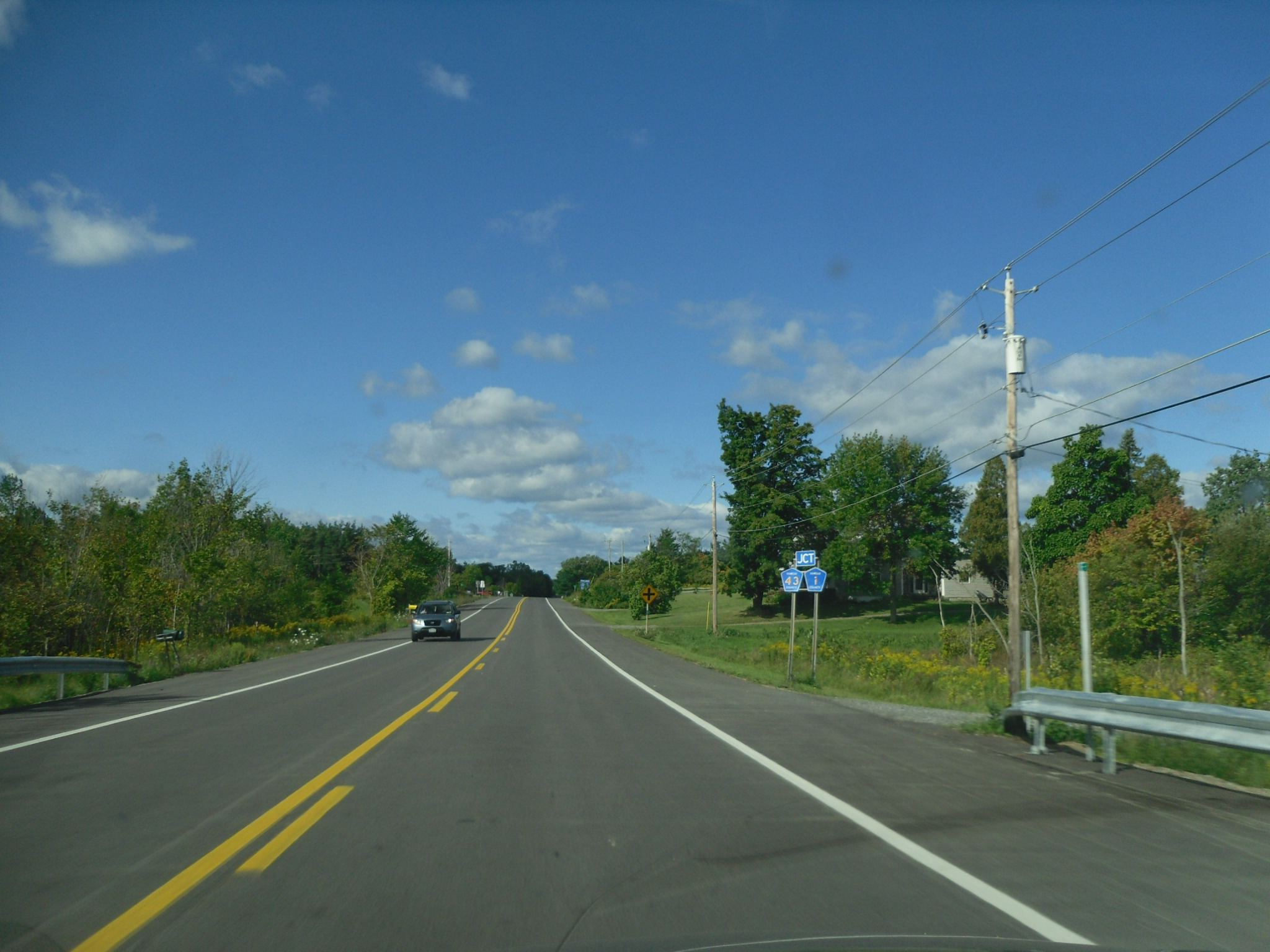
NY 104B at the junction with CR 43 and CR 1 in Hickory Grove

NY 104B begins at an intersection with NY 104 in the town of New Haven, located 9 miles (14 km) east of the city of Oswego. It heads northeast as a two-lane, rural highway, surrounded on both sides by dense woods. The route's most major intersection, situated about halfway along its 6-mile (10 km) routing, is with County Route 1 (CR 1) east of the hamlet of Hickory Grove. At this point, NY 104B begins to follow a routing parallel to the Lake Ontario shoreline 1 mile (1.6 km) to the north. While it also becomes the closest continuous east–west highway to the lake shore here, the shoreline itself is served by a series of short north–south roads that branch from NY 104B and head north to Lake Ontario.

Past CR 1, the route serves less isolated areas as it crosses small patches of open farmland on its way to the town of Mexico. After 1 mile (1.6 km), NY 104B enters the small hamlet of Texas, located on the western bank of the Little Salmon River. The highway continues on, crossing the river and passing by more forests and fields on its way to a junction with NY 3 roughly 1.5 miles (2.4 km) east of Texas, where NY 104B comes to an end. NY 3 enters the intersection from the south and leaves it to the east, following the right-of-way of NY 104B northeastward along Lake Ontario. NY 104B effectively serves as a northerly bypass of the village of Mexico, located 3.5 miles (5.6 km) to the south of NY 104B's eastern terminus at the junction of NY 3 and NY 104.

The entirety of NY 104B is part of the Seaway Trail, a National Scenic Byway that extends across most of Upstate New York from the Pennsylvania state line to Massena. West of New Haven, the byway follows NY 104 toward Oswego. At NY 104B's east end, the trail continues toward Pulaski on NY 3.

== History ==
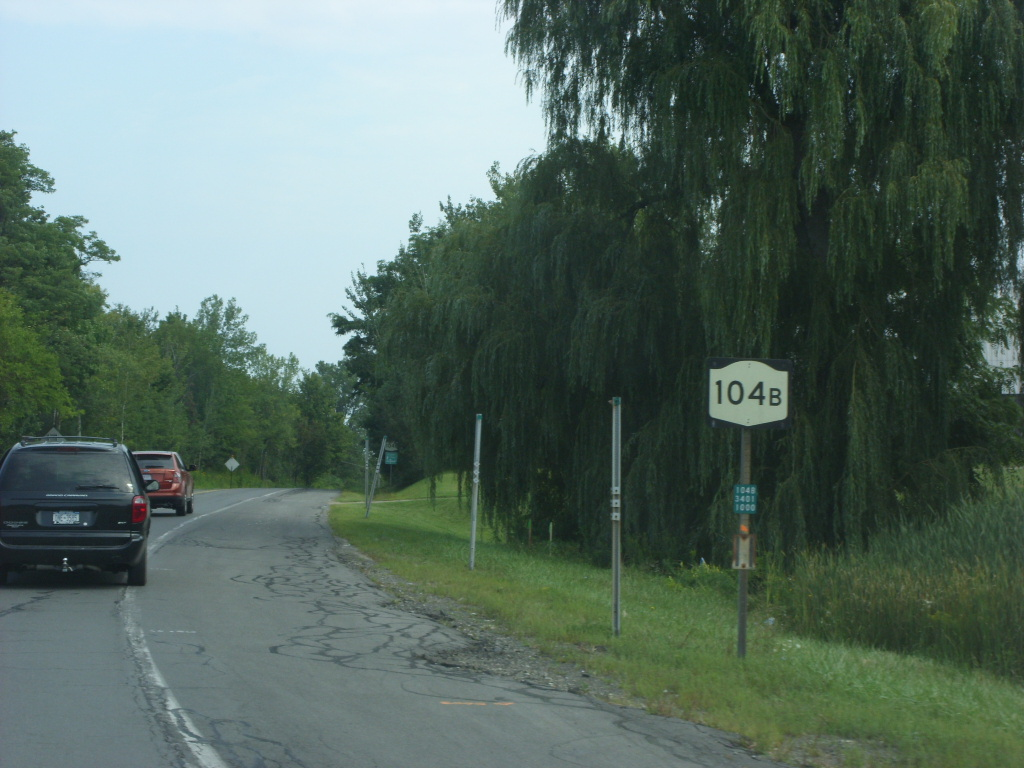
A rotting NY 104B shield at the junction with NY 104 in New Haven

When NY 3 was first assigned, it extended westward to Niagara Falls, mostly by way of modern NY 31, Ridge Road and NY 104. In the 1930 renumbering of state highways in New York, the NY 3A through NY 3C and NY 3E designations were assigned to four spur routes of NY 3 in western and central New York. By the following year, a connector linking NY 3 in New Haven to NY 3C in the town of Mexico via the hamlets of New Haven, Demster, and Texas was designated as NY 3D. The suffixes of all of NY 3's suffixed routes were increased by one letter (A to B, and so on) c. 1932 following the establishment of a new NY 3A in Niagara County. Thus, NY 3C became NY 3D while the pre-existing NY 3D was renumbered to NY 3E.

U.S. Route 104 (US 104) was assigned in April 1935 to an alignment extending from Niagara Falls to Maple View. East of Rochester, US 104 mostly followed the routing of NY 3, which was realigned to use NY 3D south of Watertown. Although NY 3E still connected to NY 3, it was renumbered to NY 104B at this time. The portion of NY 104B within the town of New Haven was realigned in the late 1940s to follow a new highway that bypassed the hamlets of New Haven and Demster to the north and south, respectively. The old alignment of NY 104B is now maintained by Oswego County as part of CR 6 from NY 104 to CR 1 and as part of CR 1 from CR 6 to where it meets modern NY 104B southwest of Texas.

== Major intersections ==
The entire route is in Oswego County.

Location	mi	km	Destinations	Notes
New Haven	0.00	0.00	NY 104 / Great Lakes Seaway Trail – Oswego, Rochester	Western terminus
Mexico	6.07	9.77	NY 3 / Great Lakes Seaway Trail – Mexico, Fulton	Eastern terminus
1.000 mi = 1.609 km; 1.000 km = 0.621 mi
