= Fruit Valley, New York =

Fruit Valley
- hamlet
- Location within the state of New York
- Coordinates: 43°26′07″N 76°33′50″W
- Country: United States
- State: New York
- County: Oswego
- City: Oswego
- Time zone: UTC-5 (Eastern (EST))
  - Summer (DST): UTC-4 (EDT)

Fruit Valley is a postal hamlet in the western part of the town of Oswego, New York, United States, located on Route 104. It borders Hannibal to the west and the State University of New York at Oswego to the east.

Its post office is located on the site of the first log cabin of the city of Oswego, erected in 1797 by Asa Rice, the founder of Oswego. Fruit Valley is sometimes referred to as "Union Village", the city's original name.
