= William A. Barclay =

American politician (born 1969)

Will Barclay

Minority Leader of the New York State Assembly
- In office January 7, 2020 – February 9, 2026
- Preceded by: Brian Kolb
- Succeeded by: Ed Ra

Member of the New York State Assembly from the 120th district
- Incumbent
- Assumed office January 1, 2003
- Preceded by: Bob Warner
- Succeeded by: Jim Weatherup (elect)

Personal details
- Born: William Anson Barclay; January 5, 1969 (age 57) Syracuse, New York, U.S.
- Party: Republican
- Spouse: Margaret Barclay
- Children: 2
- Relatives: H. Douglas Barclay (father)
- Education: St. Lawrence University (BA); Syracuse University (JD)
- Website: State Assembly website

William Anson Barclay (born January 5, 1969) is an American politician and attorney from the State of New York. A Republican, he has served in the New York State Assembly since 2003. In January 2020, Barclay was elected to the position of Assembly minority leader. In February 2026, Barclay announced that he was stepping down from his leadership position and that he would not seek re-election in the fall.

== Early life, family, education, and law practice ==
William Anson Barclay was born on January 5, 1969 in Syracuse, New York to H. Douglas Barclay and Dee Dee Barclay. H. Douglas Barclay, who served as U.S. ambassador to El Salvador and as chair of the Republican Conference in the New York State Senate, was "among the most influential Republicans in New York state during a 52-year political career". The Barclay family owns Douglas Outdoors, an Otsego County company that makes fishing equipment.

Barclay earned his B.A. from St. Lawrence University in 1992 and his Juris Doctor from Syracuse University College of Law in 1995. After graduating from law school, he served as a clerk for Roger Miner, a judge of the United States Court of Appeals for the Second Circuit.

As of 2020, Barclay was a partner in the law firm of Barclay Damon.

== Political career ==
Barclay was first elected to the State Assembly on November 5, 2002, defeating Democrat E. Clyde Ohl by a margin of 21,848 to 14,594. He took office in 2003. Barclay won the November 2008 general election with 67 percent of the vote and ran uncontested in the November 2010 and 2012 general elections. A Republican, Barclay represents the 120th District in the New York State Assembly. As of 2024, the 120th district includes Oswego County and portions of Cayuga and Jefferson Counties.

Barclay ran for New York State Senate in New York's 48th Senate district in a 2008 special election. He sought to replace former senator Jim Wright, who had stepped down. Barclay lost the election to Democratic assemblyman Darrel Aubertine on February 27, 2008.

On January 7, 2020, Barclay was unanimously elected to the post of Assembly minority leader by his Republican colleagues following the resignation of Brian Kolb. He previously served as Deputy minority leader, as chair of the Republican Assembly Campaign Committee, and as ranking member of the Assembly Ways and Means Committee.

Barclay has called for the repeal of the following laws: New York's 2019 bail reform law; the Raise the Age Act, which increased the age at which persons are held accountable for crimes as adults; the Humane Alternatives to Long-Term Solitary Confinement (HALT) Act, which he argued has caused increases in prison violence; the Green Light Law, which allowed undocumented immigrants to obtain New York driver licenses; the NY SAFE Act, a 2013 gun control law; and congestion pricing in New York City. Barclay and the Assembly Minority Conference have proposed an Inflation Relief and Consumer Assistance Plan (which would remove sales taxes on some essential goods) as well as tax incentives for families and childcare providers. He opposed 2024 New York Proposal 1, an equal rights amendment to the Constitution of New York.

In February 2026, Barclay announced that he was stepping down from the position of Assembly minority leader and that he would not seek re-election in the fall. Assembly Republicans chose Ed Ra as the next Assembly minority leader.

== Personal life ==
Barclay and his wife, Margaret, have two sons: Harry and George. As of 2020, the Barclays lived on a 500-acre farm on the Salmon River in Pulaski, New York. Nine generations of Barclays have resided at the farm, and the Barclays' house was built by Barclay's fourth great-grandfather.

New York State Assembly
Preceded by Brian Kolb	Minority Leader of the New York Assembly; 2020–2026	Succeeded by Ed Ra
