= Texas, New York =

- hamlet
- Location within the state of New York Texas, New York (the United States)
- Coordinates: 43°30′46″N 76°15′5″W
- Country: United States
- State: New York
- County: Oswego
- City: Mexico
- Time zone: UTC-5 (Eastern (EST))
  - Summer (DST): UTC-4 (EDT)

Texas is a hamlet in Oswego County, New York, United States, near the southeastern corner of Lake Ontario. It is officially part of the town of Mexico.

== Geography ==
Texas lies on Little Salmon River, approximately one-half mile (0.8 km) above the mouth of that river on Lake Ontario, on an east-west section between two bends. Its only major road is New York State Route 104B, which parallels the east-west section of the stream. Chief points of interest include Mexico Point State Park, Salmon Country Marina & Campgrounds, and nearby Derby Hill Bird Sanctuary.

== History ==
In 1790, George Scriba, a merchant of New York City and a German by birth, purchased 500,000 acres (2,000 km^{2}) of land lying between Oneida Lake and Lake Ontario, for the sum of $80,000 (approximately $870,000 in today's money). This purchase, known as "Scriba's Patent", was bounded on the east by Fish Creek and on the west by the Oswego River, and embraced 14 towns in Oswego County and four towns in Oneida County. Around 1794, Scriba founded the settlement of Vera Cruz at the mouth of Little Salmon Creek (today known as the Little Salmon River), on the shore of Lake Ontario, 12 miles (19 km) northeast of Fort Ontario. Scriba built a gristmill, a store, and other buildings, and began an active trade on the lake.

While the settlement showed initial promise, a series of disasters including the drowning of the heads of seven households in 1799, the British embargo on American trade prior to the War of 1812, the war itself, and a massive fire in 1820, spelled doom.

Soon after the fire, S. P. Robinson established a boat yard and built boats there for five or six years, and later a paper mill and store were conducted for a time. A United States Post Office was established in 1839 but discontinued in 1905. For several years a life-saving station was maintained by the state, but it burned in 1886 and was not rebuilt. The hamlet's name became Texas some time between 1820 and 1860, probably soon after the fire. The present name is after the territory of Texas.

== Demographics ==
Oswego County property tax records show approximately 50 houses in Texas. The population is said to be around 200.

== See also ==
- New York, Texas
