= Sand Ridge, New York =

- CDP
- Location in Oswego County and the state of New York.
- Coordinates: 43°15′8″N 76°13′33″W
- Country: United States
- State: New York
- County: Oswego

Area
  - Total: 2.78 sq mi (7.21 km^{2})
  - Land: 2.71 sq mi (7.01 km^{2})
  - Water: 0.077 sq mi (0.20 km^{2})
- Elevation: 433 ft (132 m)

Population (2020)
  - Total: 992
  - Density: 366.3/sq mi (141.41/km^{2})
- Time zone: UTC-5 (Eastern (EST))
  - Summer (DST): UTC-4 (EDT)
- FIPS code: 36-65024
- GNIS feature ID: 1867417

Sand Ridge is a hamlet (and census-designated place) in Oswego County, New York, United States. As of the 2020 census, Sand Ridge had a population of 992.

Sand Ridge is in the southern section of the Town of Schroeppel.

== Geography ==
Sand Ridge is located at 43°15′8″N 76°13′33″W (43.252294, -76.225756).

According to the United States Census Bureau, the CDP has a total area of 2.5 square miles (6.5 km^{2}), of which 2.4 square miles (6.2 km^{2}) is land and 0.04 square miles (0.10 km^{2}) (1.22%) is water.

== Demographics ==
Historical population
Census	Pop.	Note	%±
2020	992		—
U.S. Decennial Census

As of the census of 2000, there were 906 people, 349 households, and 242 families residing in the CDP. The population density was 375.1 inhabitants per square mile (144.8/km^{2}). There were 438 housing units at an average density of 181.3 per square mile (70.0/km^{2}). The racial makeup of the CDP was 96.69% White, 0.22% African American, 0.88% Native American, 0.44% Asian, 0.11% from other races, and 1.66% from two or more races. Hispanic or Latino of any race were 0.44% of the population.

There were 349 households, out of which 37.8% had children under the age of 18 living with them, 51.3% were married couples living together, 12.0% had a female householder with no husband present, and 30.4% were non-families. 26.1% of all households were made up of individuals, and 7.4% had someone living alone who was 65 years of age or older. The average household size was 2.60 and the average family size was 3.10.

In the CDP, the population was spread out, with 27.7% under the age of 18, 9.3% from 18 to 24, 31.5% from 25 to 44, 23.8% from 45 to 64, and 7.7% who were 65 years of age or older. The median age was 35 years. For every 100 females, there were 106.4 males. For every 100 females age 18 and over, there were 100.9 males.

The median income for a household in the CDP was $34,732, and the median income for a family was $43,750. Males had a median income of $33,750 versus $29,875 for females. The per capita income for the CDP was $16,893. About 7.7% of families and 7.3% of the population were below the poverty line, including 8.4% of those under age 18 and 10.9% of those age 65 or over.
