= Oswego (town), New York =

Oswego, New York
- Town
- Town of Oswego
- Location in Oswego County and the state of New York.
- Coordinates: 43°25′0″N 76°33′4″W
- Country: United States
- State: New York
- County: Oswego

Area
  - Total: 29.3 sq mi (76.0 km^{2})
  - Land: 27.4 sq mi (71.0 km^{2})
  - Water: 1.9 sq mi (5.0 km^{2})
- Elevation: 341 ft (104 m)

Population (2010)
  - Total: 7,984
- Time zone: UTC-5 (Eastern (EST))
  - Summer (DST): UTC-4 (EDT)
- ZIP code: 13126
- Area code: 315
- FIPS code: 36-55585
- GNIS feature ID: 0979326

Oswego is a town in Oswego County, New York, United States. The population was 16,921 at the 2020 census.

The Town of Oswego is immediately west of the City of Oswego, with which it has a common border. The town is in the western part of Oswego County.

The State University of New York at Oswego is in the northeast part of the town, next to the City of Oswego.

Oswego is the birthplace of Mary Edwards Walker, the only woman to win the Medal of Honor.

== History ==
The town was first settled circa 1797. The Town of Oswego was established in 1818 from the Town of Hannibal and is on the western border of the county. Part of the town was annexed by the Town of Granby in 1836. The incorporation of the "Village of Oswego" as the City of Oswego in 1848 removed a portion of the town. Later, the formation of the Town of Minetto reduced Oswego further.

== Geography ==
According to the United States Census Bureau, the town has a total area of 29.3 square miles (76 km^{2}), of which 27.4 square miles (71 km^{2}) is land and 1.9 square miles (4.9 km^{2}) (6.54%) is water.

Lake Ontario and the Oswego River help define the town's borders. The western town line is the border of Cayuga County.

The eastern junction of New York State Route 104 and New York State Route 104A are in the town at Southwest Oswego.

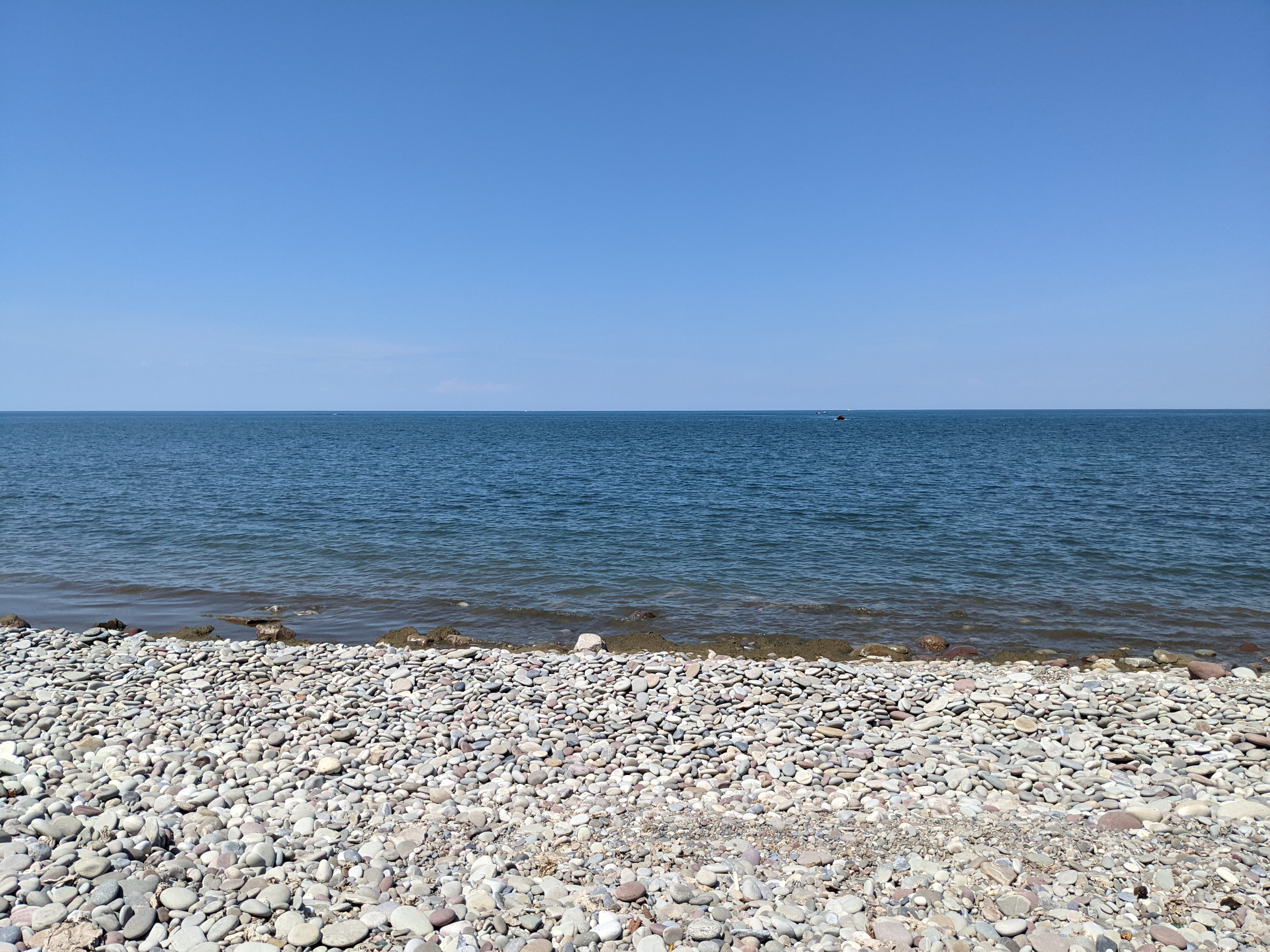
Lake Ontario as seen in the Town of Oswego.

== Demographics ==
Historical population
Census	Pop.	Note	%±
1820	992		—
1830	2,703		172.5%
1840	4,665		72.6%
1850	2,445		−47.6%
1860	3,181		30.1%
1870	3,043		−4.3%
1880	3,022		−0.7%
1890	2,772		−8.3%
1900	2,737		−1.3%
1910	2,671		−2.4%
1920	1,662		−37.8%
1930	1,830		10.1%
1940	1,972		7.8%
1950	2,106		6.8%
1960	2,796		32.8%
1970	6,514		133.0%
1980	7,865		20.7%
1990	8,027		2.1%
2000	7,287		−9.2%
2010	7,984		9.6%
2014 (est.)	7,920		−0.8%
U.S. Decennial Census

As of the census of 2000, there were 7,287 people, 1,734 households, and 1,255 families residing in the town. The population density was 265.8 inhabitants per square mile (102.6/km^{2}). There were 1,904 housing units at an average density of 26.8 persons/km^{2} (69.4 persons/sq mi). The racial makeup of the town was 94.00% White, 2.46% African American, 0.14% Native American, 1.25% Asian, 0.03% Pacific Islander, 1.15% from other races, and 0.97% from two or more races. 2.00% of the population were Hispanic or Latino of any race.

There were 1,734 households, out of which 35.1% had children under the age of 18 living with them, 61.9% were married couples living together, 7.4% have a woman whose husband does not live with her, and 27.6% were non-families. 21.7% of all households were made up of individuals, and 7.1% had someone living alone who was 65 years of age or older. The average household size was 2.64 and the average family size was 3.09.

In the town, the population was spread out, with 16.4% under the age of 18, 41.9% from 18 to 24, 18.1% from 25 to 44, 16.8% from 45 to 64, and 6.8% who were 65 years of age or older. The median age was 22 years. For every 100 females, there were 92.9 males. For every 100 females age 18 and over, there were 90.3 males.

The median income for a household in the town was $49,883, and the median income for a family was $61,648. Males had a median income of $47,051 versus $25,833 for females. The per capita income for the town was $14,835. 7.8% of the population and 4.9% of families were below the poverty line. Out of the total people living in poverty, 6.6% are under the age of 18 and 10.6% are 65 or older.

== Communities and locations in the town of Oswego ==
- Burts Point – A location west of Oswego Beach and a projection into Lake Ontario.
- Camp Hollis – A location near Lake Ontario, north of Southwest Oswego.
- Fruit Valley – A hamlet on Route 104, west of the City of Oswego. It is sometimes known as "Union Village." Fruit Valley is one of the oldest communities in the town.
- Furniss – A hamlet south of Oswego Center.
- Oswego Beach – A lakeside hamlet on the shore of Lake Ontario near the City of Oswego.
- Oswego Center – A hamlet near the center of the town.
- Southwest Oswego – A hamlet in the northwestern corner of the town on Route 104.

== Education ==
Most of the town is in the Oswego City School District while portions of the town are in the Hannibal Central School District and the Fulton City School District.

The majority of the State University of New York at Oswego is in the town. The SUNY Oswego census-designated place takes up much of that property.
