= Schroeppel, New York =

- Town
- Location in Oswego County and the state of New York.
- Coordinates: 43°15′27″N 76°16′30″W
- Country: United States
- State: New York
- County: Oswego

Area
  - Total: 43.20 sq mi (111.88 km^{2})
  - Land: 42.20 sq mi (109.30 km^{2})
  - Water: 1.00 sq mi (2.58 km^{2})
- Elevation: 390 ft (120 m)

Population (2010)
  - Total: 8,501
  - Estimate (2016): 8,208
  - Density: 195/sq mi (75.1/km^{2})
- Time zone: UTC-5 (Eastern (EST))
  - Summer (DST): UTC-4 (EDT)
- ZIP code: 13135
- Area code: 315
- FIPS code: 36-65618
- GNIS feature ID: 0979471
- Website: Town Website

Schroeppel is a town in Oswego County, New York, United States. The population was 8,501 at the 2010 census. The name derives from the Schroeppel family, early land owners of the area. Schroeppel is located in the southeast part of the county.

== History ==
The town of Schroeppel was formed in 1832 from the town of Volney.

The Schroeppel House was listed on the National Register of Historic Places in 1982.

== Geography ==
The southwestern town line, marked by the Oneida River, is the border of Onondaga County. The southwestern town boundary is partly formed by the Oswego River. The Erie Canal is on the southern border of the town.

According to the United States Census Bureau, the town has a total area of 43.2 square miles (112 km^{2}), of which 42.3 square miles (110 km^{2}) is land and 0.9 square miles (2.3 km^{2}) (2.01%) is water.

== Demographics ==
Historical population
Census	Pop.	Note	%±
1840	2,098		—
1850	3,258		55.3%
1860	4,011		23.1%
1870	3,987		−0.6%
1880	3,381		−15.2%
1890	3,026		−10.5%
1900	3,012		−0.5%
1910	2,707		−10.1%
1920	2,617		−3.3%
1930	3,010		15.0%
1940	3,219		6.9%
1950	4,037		25.4%
1960	5,554		37.6%
1970	7,153		28.8%
1980	8,016		12.1%
1990	8,931		11.4%
2000	8,566		−4.1%
2010	8,501		−0.8%
2016 (est.)	8,208		−3.4%
U.S. Decennial Census

As of the census of 2000, there were 8,566 people, 3,251 households, and 2,347 families residing in the town. The population density was 202.4 inhabitants per square mile (78.1/km^{2}). There were 3,590 housing units at an average density of 84.8 per square mile (32.7/km^{2}). The racial makeup of the town was 97.79% White, 0.39% African American, 0.68% Native American, 0.30% Asian, 0.09% from other races, and 0.75% from two or more races. Hispanic or Latino of any race were 0.84% of the population.

There were 3,251 households, out of which 36.9% had children under the age of 18 living with them, 55.6% were married couples living together, 12.0% had a female householder with no husband present, and 27.8% were non-families. 22.6% of all households were made up of individuals, and 9.4% had someone living alone who was 65 years of age or older. The average household size was 2.63 and the average family size was 3.06.

In the town, the population was spread out, with 28.1% under the age of 18, 7.2% from 18 to 24, 30.6% from 25 to 44, 23.9% from 45 to 64, and 10.1% who were 65 years of age or older. The median age was 36 years. For every 100 females, there were 99.0 males. For every 100 females age 18 and over, there were 94.1 males.

The median income for a household in the town was $39,662, and the median income for a family was $45,766. Males had a median income of $31,191 versus $27,864 for females. The per capita income for the town was $17,581. About 7.7% of families and 9.7% of the population were below the poverty line, including 12.4% of those under age 18 and 12.4% of those age 65 or over.

== Communities and locations in Schroeppel ==
- Bowen Corners – A hamlet by the northern town line.
- Caughdenoy – A hamlet on the eastern town line.
- Gilbert Mills – A hamlet in the northwestern corner of the town, named from Gilbert brothers who built a mill here.
- Great Bear Siding – A location in the southwestern part of the town.
- Hinmansville-- A hamlet in the Southwestern part of the town.
- McMahon Corners – A hamlet on the northern town line.
- Peacock Corners – A hamlet north of Sand Ridge.
- Pennellville – A hamlet in the center of the town, named after Richard Pennell, MD.
- Peter Scott Swamp – A swamp in the southern part of the town.
- Phoenix – The Village of Phoenix.
- Roosevelt Corners – A hamlet by the northern town line.
- Sand Ridge – A hamlet in the southern part of the town.
- Shephard Corners – A hamlet by the northern town line.
- Stewart Corners – A hamlet north of Peter Scott Swamp.
