= Scriba, New York =

- Town
- Location in Oswego County and the state of New York.
- Coordinates: 43°28′5″N 76°24′56″W
- Country: United States
- State: New York
- County: Oswego

Area
  - Total: 43.91 sq mi (113.73 km^{2})
  - Land: 40.57 sq mi (105.08 km^{2})
  - Water: 3.34 sq mi (8.66 km^{2})
- Elevation: 469 ft (143 m)

Population (2010)
  - Total: 6,840
  - Estimate (2016): 6,597
  - Density: 162.6/sq mi (62.78/km^{2})
- Time zone: UTC-5 (Eastern (EST))
  - Summer (DST): UTC-4 (EDT)
- ZIP code: 13126
- Area code: 315
- FIPS code: 36-65992
- GNIS feature ID: 0979478
- Website: https://scribany.gov/

Scriba is a town in Oswego County, New York, United States. The population was 6,840 at the 2010 census. The town is named after landowner George Scriba.

The Town of Scriba is east of the City of Oswego. The town was created in 1811 from the Town of Volney, then known as the Town of Fredericksburg.

The town of Scriba includes an Oswego County fire department, a municipal building, highway department, justice center, buildings and grounds department and a water department, as well as a child care center, town park and sunset bay park with lake access. The Nine Mile Point Nuclear Generating Station and the James A. FitzPatrick Nuclear Power Plant are both also located within the towns territory.

Most of the town lies within the zip code 13126 and possesses an "Oswego" mailing address. However, a portion of the town lies within zip code 13069 and uses "Fulton" as their mailing address. The hamlet of Lycoming, located within the town, has its own post office and uses the zip code 13093 for PO boxes only.

== Geography ==
The town borders Lake Ontario, the City of Oswego, and the Oswego River.

Scriba is approximately 40 miles north of Syracuse.

According to the United States Census Bureau, the town has a total area of 43.9 square miles (114 km^{2}), of which 40.6 square miles (105 km^{2}) is land and 3.3 square miles (8.5 km^{2}) (7.50%) is water.

== Demographics ==
Historical population
Census	Pop.	Note	%±
1820	899		—
1830	2,073		130.6%
1840	4,051		95.4%
1850	2,738		−32.4%
1860	3,282		19.9%
1870	3,065		−6.6%
1880	2,971		−3.1%
1890	2,480		−16.5%
1900	2,480		0.0%
1910	2,199		−11.3%
1920	1,817		−17.4%
1930	1,973		8.6%
1940	2,184		10.7%
1950	2,248		2.9%
1960	2,489		10.7%
1970	3,619		45.4%
1980	5,455		50.7%
1990	6,472		18.6%
2000	7,331		13.3%
2010	6,840		−6.7%
2016 (est.)	6,597		−3.6%
U.S. Decennial Census

As of the census of 2000, there were 7,331 people, 2,721 households, and 1,937 families residing in the town. The population density was 180.7 inhabitants per square mile (69.8/km^{2}). There were 3,053 housing units at an average density of 75.2 per square mile (29.0/km^{2}). The racial makeup of the town was 97.19% White, 0.38% African American, 0.38% Native American, 0.56% Asian, 0.03% Pacific Islander, 0.64% from other races, and 0.82% from two or more races. Hispanic or Latino of any race were 1.83% of the population.

There were 2,721 households, out of which 38.6% had children under the age of 18 living with them, 55.9% were married couples living together, 10.3% had a female householder with no husband present, and 28.8% were non-families. 20.9% of all households were made up of individuals, and 6.0% had someone living alone who was 65 years of age or older. The average household size was 2.64 and the average family size was 3.07.

In the town, the population was spread out, with 28.4% under the age of 18, 8.9% from 18 to 24, 32.5% from 25 to 44, 22.1% from 45 to 64, and 8.1% who were 65 years of age or older. The median age was 34 years. For every 100 females, there were 105.2 males. For every 100 females age 18 and over, there were 104.7 males.

The median income for a household in the town was $39,550, and the median income for a family was $44,304. Males had a median income of $35,974 versus $25,329 for females. The per capita income for the town was $17,939. About 10.6% of families and 14.8% of the population were below the poverty line, including 21.1% of those under age 18 and 2.3% of those age 65 or over.

== Notable person ==
- Curtis F. Shoup, Medal of Honor recipient

== Communities and locations in Scriba ==
- Klocks Corners – Located at the intersection of County Route 4 and the Klocks Corners Road. Named after Jermiah Klock.
- Lycoming – A hamlet located in Scriba with its own zip code 13093 and a US post office, located on County Route 29.
- Scriba – The hamlet of Scriba located within route 104 and Creamery Road.
- North Scriba - a hamlet of Scriba, located at the intersection of County Routes 1 and 29. North Scriba Union cemetery is located here.
- South Scriba - a hamlet of Scriba, located at the intersection of County Routes 4 and 29.
- Lansing - a hamlet of Scriba, located at the intersection of County Routes 4 and 53.
