= Orwell, New York =

- Town
- Location in Oswego County and the state of New York.
- Coordinates: 43°33′30″N 75°57′3″W
- Country: United States
- State: New York
- County: Oswego

Area
  - Total: 41.27 sq mi (106.88 km^{2})
  - Land: 39.58 sq mi (102.52 km^{2})
  - Water: 1.68 sq mi (4.36 km^{2})
- Elevation: 1,001 ft (305 m)

Population (2010)
  - Total: 1,167
  - Estimate (2016): 1,177
  - Density: 29.7/sq mi (11.48/km^{2})
- Time zone: UTC-5 (Eastern (EST))
  - Summer (DST): UTC-4 (EDT)
- ZIP code: 13426
- Area code: 315
- FIPS code: 36-55453
- GNIS feature ID: 0979320

Orwell is a town in Oswego County, New York, United States. The population was 1,167 at the 2010 census. The town was named after Orwell, Vermont.

The Town of Orwell is in the north-central part of the county.

== History ==
The town was first settled around 1806. The Town of Orwell was created from part of the Town of Richland in 1817. In 1828, Orwell was reduced by the founding of the Town of Boylston, but more territory was obtained from Richland in 1844.

The Town of Orwell is a "dry" community.

== Geography ==
According to the United States Census Bureau, the town has a total area of 41.3 square miles (107 km^{2}), of which 39.8 square miles (103 km^{2}) is land and 1.5 square miles (3.9 km^{2}) (3.75%) is water.

== Transportation ==
County Route 2 runs east/west from U.S. 11 in Pulaski and Redfield. County Route 22 runs north/south from U.S. 11 in Ellisburg (as Jefferson County Route 122) to NY 69 in Parish.

Oswego County Public Transit provides service between Orwell and Fulton.

== Demographics ==
Historical population
Census	Pop.	Note	%±
1820	336		—
1830	501		49.1%
1840	808		61.3%
1850	1,106		36.9%
1860	1,435		29.7%
1870	1,215		−15.3%
1880	1,550		27.6%
1890	1,370		−11.6%
1900	1,149		−16.1%
1910	929		−19.1%
1920	890		−4.2%
1930	826		−7.2%
1940	806		−2.4%
1950	752		−6.7%
1960	663		−11.8%
1970	836		26.1%
1980	1,031		23.3%
1990	1,171		13.6%
2000	1,254		7.1%
2010	1,167		−6.9%
2016 (est.)	1,177		0.9%
U.S. Decennial Census

As of the census of 2000, there were 1,254 people, 419 households, and 300 families residing in the town. The population density was 31.5 inhabitants per square mile (12.2/km^{2}). There were 701 housing units at an average density of 17.6 per square mile (6.8/km^{2}). The racial makeup of the town was 98.17% White, 0.88% African American, 0.32% Native American, 0.08% Asian, and 0.56% from two or more races. Hispanic or Latino of any race were 0.48% of the population.

There were 419 households, out of which 35.1% had children under the age of 18 living with them, 58.7% were married couples living together, 7.4% had a female householder with no husband present, and 28.4% were non-families. 21.2% of all households were made up of individuals, and 7.2% had someone living alone who was 65 years of age or older. The average household size was 2.79 and the average family size was 3.23.

In the town, the population was spread out, with 28.6% under the age of 18, 7.0% from 18 to 24, 28.1% from 25 to 44, 26.5% from 45 to 64, and 9.7% who were 65 years of age or older. The median age was 36 years. For every 100 females, there were 120.0 males. For every 100 females age 18 and over, there were 124.9 males.

The median income for a household in the town was $35,000, and the median income for a family was $37,500. Males had a median income of $34,000 versus $21,500 for females. The per capita income for the town was $15,256. About 16.6% of families and 21.5% of the population were below the poverty line, including 25.7% of those under age 18 and 10.4% of those age 65 or over.

== Communities and locations in Orwell ==
- Beecherville – A hamlet in the southeastern part of the town, northeast of Stillwater.
- Bennett Bridge – A location south of Pekin.
- Castor Corners – A location northwest of Orwell village.
- Chateaugay – A hamlet east of Orwell village. It was also called "Shatagee."
- Little America – A location southeast of Stillwater.
- New Scriba – A hamlet on the northern town line east of Vorea.
- Orwell – The hamlet of Orwell, sometimes called "Orwell Corners," is at the junction of Routes 2 and 22.
- Salmon River Falls – A 110-foot (34 m) waterfall located within the town.
- Salmon River Reservoir – Part of the reservoir is in the southeastern part of the town.
- Stillwater – A hamlet in the southeastern section of the town. The Stillwater Bridge was listed on the National Register of Historic Places in 1997.
- Vorea – A hamlet northeast of Orwell village near the northern town line.
