= Boylston, New York =

- Town
- Location in Oswego County and the state of New York.
- Coordinates: 43°39′22″N 75°58′44″W
- Country: United States
- State: New York
- County: Oswego

Area
  - Total: 39.16 sq mi (101.42 km^{2})
  - Land: 39.14 sq mi (101.37 km^{2})
  - Water: 0.019 sq mi (0.05 km^{2})
- Elevation: 1,207 ft (368 m)

Population (2010)
  - Total: 549
  - Estimate (2016): 547
  - Density: 14/sq mi (5.4/km^{2})
- Time zone: UTC-5 (Eastern (EST))
  - Summer (DST): UTC-4 (EDT)
- ZIP code: 13083
- Area code: 315
- FIPS code: 36-07674
- GNIS feature ID: 0978746

Boylston is a town in Oswego County, New York, United States. The population was 498 at the 2020 census, down from 549 at the 2010 census. The name is that of the first landowner of the tract that became the town.

The Town of Boylston is located on the northern boundary of the county.

== History ==
The region was first called "Campania" and was first settled circa 1812. Boylston was created from part of the Town of Orwell in 1828. The population of the town was always small.

== Geography ==
According to the United States Census Bureau, the town has a total area of 39.2 square miles (102 km^{2}), of which 39.1 square miles (101 km^{2}) is land and 0.03% is water.

The northern town line, as well as part of the western town boundary, is the border of Jefferson County.

== Demographics ==
Historical population
Census	Pop.	Note	%±
1830	388		—
1840	481		24.0%
1850	621		29.1%
1860	909		46.4%
1870	1,053		15.8%
1880	1,283		21.8%
1890	1,081		−15.7%
1900	849		−21.5%
1910	667		−21.4%
1920	545		−18.3%
1930	444		−18.5%
1940	365		−17.8%
1950	302		−17.3%
1960	293		−3.0%
1970	276		−5.8%
1980	390		41.3%
1990	443		13.6%
2000	505		14.0%
2010	549		8.7%
2016 (est.)	547		−0.4%
U.S. Decennial Census

As of the census of 2000, there were 505 people, 193 households, and 137 families residing in the town. The population density was 12.9 inhabitants per square mile (5.0/km^{2}). There were 333 housing units at an average density of 8.5 per square mile (3.3/km^{2}). The racial makeup of the town was 98.02% White, 1.19% from other races, and 0.79% from two or more races. Hispanic or Latino of any race were 2.18% of the population.

There were 193 households, out of which 31.6% had children under the age of 18 living with them, 58.0% were married couples living together, 7.3% had a female householder with no husband present, and 29.0% were non-families. 22.3% of all households were made up of individuals, and 7.3% had someone living alone who was 65 years of age or older. The average household size was 2.62 and the average family size was 3.06.

In the town, the population was spread out, with 26.5% under the age of 18, 5.7% from 18 to 24, 30.5% from 25 to 44, 24.6% from 45 to 64, and 12.7% who were 65 years of age or older. The median age was 38 years. For every 100 females, there were 110.4 males. For every 100 females age 18 and over, there were 107.3 males.

The median income for a household in the town was $39,375, and the median income for a family was $44,792. Males had a median income of $32,083 versus $25,625 for females. The per capita income for the town was $17,360. About 6.0% of families and 8.3% of the population were below the poverty line, including 12.8% of those under age 18 and 7.2% of those age 65 or over.

== Communities and locations in Boylston ==
- Boylston Center – A hamlet located near the center of the town at County Routes 13 and 50.
- East Boylston – A hamlet in the northeastern part of the town on County Route 17.
- Hemlock District – A location east of Boylston Center.
- North Boylston – A hamlet in the northwestern corner of the town.
- Plantz Corners – A hamlet near the eastern town line on County Routes 13 and 17.
- Smartville – A hamlet south of Boylston Center on County Route 50.
- Tamarack Swamp – A bog in the southeastern section of the town.
