= Hastings, New York =

- Town
- Location in Oswego County and the state of New York.
- Coordinates: 43°18′21″N 76°9′10″W
- Country: United States
- State: New York
- County: Oswego

Area
  - Total: 46.00 sq mi (119.13 km^{2})
  - Land: 45.64 sq mi (118.22 km^{2})
  - Water: 0.35 sq mi (0.91 km^{2})
- Elevation: 449 ft (137 m)

Population (2010)
  - Total: 9,450
  - Estimate (2016): 9,289
  - Density: 203.5/sq mi (78.57/km^{2})
- Time zone: UTC-5 (Eastern (EST))
  - Summer (DST): UTC-4 (EDT)
- ZIP code: 13076
- Area code: 315
- FIPS code: 36-32688
- GNIS feature ID: 0979057
- Website: https://hastingsny.gov/

Hastings is a town in Oswego County, New York, United States. Its population was 9,450 at the 2010 census. It is named after Hastings Curtiss, a prominent citizen and member of the State Assembly in 1824.

It is on the county's southern border. U.S. Route 11 and Interstate 81 pass through it.

== History ==
Hastings was the first town settled in Oswego County when Oliver Stevens built a rude house near the abandoned Fort Brewerton in 1789. Stevens used the location to trade with Indians and to provide a tavern-like establishment for the boatmen who frequented the nearby river and lake. The region was originally called "Breda." The town was formed in 1825 from Constantia. The early industry was lumbering and manufacturing of wooden products.

The Carley's Mills Schoolhouse was listed on the National Register of Historic Places in 2005.

== Geography ==
According to the United States Census Bureau, the town has a total area of 46.0 square miles (119 km^{2}), of which 45.8 square miles (119 km^{2}) is land and 0.2 square miles (0.52 km^{2}) (0.54%) is water.

The southern town line is the Oneida River and the border of Onondaga County. The southern tip of the town is at the western end of Oneida Lake, where it becomes the Oneida River.

== Demographics ==
Historical population
Census	Pop.	Note	%±
1820	741		—
1830	1,494		101.6%
1840	1,983		32.7%
1850	2,920		47.3%
1860	3,345		14.6%
1870	3,058		−8.6%
1880	2,856		−6.6%
1890	2,364		−17.2%
1900	2,303		−2.6%
1910	2,315		0.5%
1920	2,153		−7.0%
1930	2,149		−0.2%
1940	2,361		9.9%
1950	3,063		29.7%
1960	4,457		45.5%
1970	6,042		35.6%
1980	7,095		17.4%
1990	8,113		14.3%
2000	8,803		8.5%
2010	9,450		7.3%
2016 (est.)	9,289		−1.7%
U.S. Decennial Census

As of the census of 2000, there were 8,803 people, 3,374 households, and 2,365 families residing in the town. The population density was 192.3 inhabitants per square mile (74.2/km^{2}). There were 3,635 housing units at an average density of 79.4 per square mile (30.7/km^{2}). The racial makeup of the town was 97.75% White, 0.32% African American, 0.49% Native American, 0.30% Asian, 0.05% Pacific Islander, 0.11% from other races, and 0.99% from two or more races. Hispanic or Latino of any race were 0.67% of the population.

There were 3,374 households, out of which 35.3% had children under the age of 18 living with them, 55.5% were married couples living together, 9.8% had a female householder with no husband present, and 29.9% were non-families. 23.7% of all households were made up of individuals, and 9.6% had someone living alone who was 65 years of age or older. The average household size was 2.61 and the average family size was 3.08.

In the town, the population was spread out, with 27.2% under the age of 18, 7.0% from 18 to 24, 32.2% from 25 to 44, 22.5% from 45 to 64, and 11.1% who were 65 years of age or older. The median age was 36 years. For every 100 females, there were 98.0 males. For every 100 females age 18 and over, there were 95.3 males.

The median income for a household in the town was $40,085, and the median income for a family was $46,722. Males had a median income of $35,380 versus $24,958 for females. The per capita income for the town was $17,931. About 6.2% of families and 10.0% of the population were below the poverty line, including 11.2% of those under age 18 and 7.0% of those age 65 or over.

== Communities and locations in Hastings ==
- Bardeen Corners – A hamlet south of Hastings village on Route 11.
- Benders Corners – A location near the western town line.
- Brewerton – A hamlet that is also located in Onondaga County.
- Carley Mills – A hamlet east of Hastings village.
- Caughdenoy – A hamlet by the western town line in the southwestern corner of Hastings. It was first settled circa 1797 and is by the Oneida River. It was a center for catching and smoking eels for market.
- Central Square – The Village of Central Square is in the southern part of the town on Route 11.
- Emmons Siding – A location in the southern part of the town near Oneida Lake.
- Gardners Corners – A location west of Hastings village.
- Hastings – The hamlet of Hastings is in the northern part of the town on U.S. 11.
- Hastings Center – A hamlet north of Central Square at the intersection of County Route 4 and Perfield Road.
- Little France – A hamlet on the eastern town line, which had early settlers from France and French Canada.
- Mallory – A hamlet by the eastern town boundary.
- Mallory Station – A location west of Mallory.
- McMahon Corners – A location north of Caughdenoy on the western town line.
- Morse – A hamlet east of Hastings village and south of Carley Mills.
- Piquet Corners – A location south of Bardeen Corners on Route 11.
