= Sandy Creek, New York =

Town in New York, United States

Coordinates: 43.644173°N 76.086438°W

Location in Oswego County and the state of New York.

Sandy Creek is a town in Oswego County, New York, United States. The population was 3,939 at the time of the 2010 census. The name is derived from the Sandy Creek stream passing through the area. The Town of Sandy Creek is in the northwestern part of the county. The village of Sandy Creek is located within the town.

== History ==
1867 map of the area

Champlain passed through the town in 1615, leading a war party of Hurons (Wendat) and soldiers.

The town was first settled around 1803, near Lacona. Sandy Creek was formed from the Town of Richland in 1825.

1875 map of Hulburton, Sandy Creek and Hinsburgh

In 1835, Sandy Creek resident Thomas Meacham decided to make the world's largest cheese as a gift to president Andrew Jackson. His finished product was 4 feet in diameter, 2 feet thick, and weighed nearly 1400 pounds. The cheese was delivered and sat in the White House until February 22, 1836, when the president invited the public to come to the White House and eat the cheese. This event was made famous in an episode of the television show The West Wing.

The Holyoke Cottage was listed on the National Register of Historic Places in 1988.

== Geography ==
According to the United States Census Bureau, the town has a total area of 46.5 square miles (120.5 km^{2}), of which 42.3 square miles (109.5 km^{2}) is land and 4.3 square miles (11.1 km^{2}) (9.17%) is water.

The western border of Sandy Creek is Lake Ontario and the northern border is Jefferson County.

Interstate 81 and U.S. Route 11 pass through the town (north-south). New York State Route 3 runs north to south near the Lake Ontario shoreline.

=== Communities and locations ===
- Community Park – A location near the northern town line.
- The Elms – A hamlet in the northwestern part of the town at the northern end of North Pond. An 18-hole golf course is located here.
- Lacona – A village east of Sandy Creek village, located on Route 22.
- North Pond – A pond in the western part of the town. The pond is similar to a lagoon by virtue of being isolated from Lake Ontario by low barrier islands. This pond is rather large (approximately two mi wide and four miles long) and much deeper than South Sandy Pond (30+ feet). It has good fishing and generally good water skiing but with considerable more chop than South Sandy Pond. The pond is popular with residents from Syracuse and Rochester, who have small cottages (camps) on water's edge. At the south end of the pond is Sandy Island Beach State Park.
- Rainbow Shores – A shoreline of Lake Ontario south of South Pond, near the southern town line.
- Sandy Creek – The Village of Sandy Creek is near the interstate highway.
- Sandy Pond – A hamlet at the southern end of North Pond.
- Sandy Pond Corners – A location east of Sandy Pond, located on Route 3.
- South Pond (also called South Sandy Pond) – A small pond south of North Pond and north of Rainbow Shores. It is connected to North Sandy Pond by a canal. Many small camps are owned by residents from Syracuse and Rochester.

== Demographics ==
Historical population
Census	Pop.	Note	%±
1830	1,839		—
1840	2,420		31.6%
1850	2,456		1.5%
1860	2,431		−1.0%
1870	2,629		8.1%
1880	2,878		9.5%
1890	2,279		−20.8%
1900	2,232		−2.1%
1910	2,106		−5.6%
1920	2,018		−4.2%
1930	2,156		6.8%
1940	1,821		−15.5%
1950	2,354		29.3%
1960	2,506		6.5%
1970	2,644		5.5%
1980	3,256		23.1%
1990	3,454		6.1%
2000	3,863		11.8%
2010	3,939		2.0%
2020	646		−83.6%
2024 (est.)	621	▼	−3.9%
U.S. Decennial Census

As of the census of 2000, there were 3,863 people, 1,543 households, and 1,064 families residing in the town. The population density was 91.4 inhabitants per square mile (35.3/km^{2}). There were 2,607 housing units at an average density of 61.7 per square mile (23.8/km^{2}). The racial makeup of the town was 98.27% White, 0.10% Black or African American, 0.36% Native American, 0.10% Asian, 0.18% from other races, and 0.98% from two or more races. Hispanic or Latino of any race were 0.47% of the population.

There were 1,543 households, out of which 31.0% had children under the age of 18 living with them, 54.1% were married couples living together, 9.4% had a female householder with no husband present, and 31.0% were non-families. 25.0% of all households were made up of individuals, and 10.2% had someone living alone who was 65 years of age or older. The average household size was 2.50 and the average family size was 2.97.

In the town, the population was spread out, with 26.0% under the age of 18, 6.8% from 18 to 24, 28.7% from 25 to 44, 26.0% from 45 to 64, and 12.5% who were 65 years of age or older. The median age was 38 years. For every 100 females, there were 100.4 males. For every 100 females age 18 and over, there were 98.7 males.

The median income for a household in the town was $33,438, and the median income for a family was $41,089. Males had a median income of $36,205 versus $22,031 for females. The per capita income for the town was $17,228. About 11.9% of families and 16.7% of the population were below the poverty line, including 23.9% of those under age 18 and 12.6% of those age 65 or over.

== Notable people ==
- Clarence D. Clark (1851–1930), member of the United States Congress
- Allen and James Thompson, both brothers were awarded the Medal of Honor for their actions in the Civil War.
