= Minetto, New York =

Minetto
- Town
- Location in Oswego County and the state of New York..

- Location of New York in the United States
- Coordinates: 43°23′47″N 76°28′28″W
- Country: United States
- State: New York
- County: Oswego County
- Incorporated: 1916

Area
  - Total: 6.1 sq mi (15.7 km^{2})
  - Land: 5.8 sq mi (15.0 km^{2})
  - Water: 0.27 sq mi (0.7 km^{2})
- Elevation: 325 ft (99 m)

Population (2010)
  - Total: 1,659
  - Estimate (2016): 1,595
  - Density: 275/sq mi (106.3/km^{2})
- Time zone: UTC-5 (EST)
  - Summer (DST): UTC-4 (EDT)
- ZIP code: 13115
- Area code: 315
- FIPS code: 36-47691
- Website: https://townofminetto.gov/

Minetto is a town in Oswego County, New York, United States. The population was 1,659 at the 2010 census. It was formed in 1916 from the town of Oswego.

The Town of Minetto is located south of the City of Oswego, which it borders.

Minetto was once a company town of the now-closed Columbia Mills textile factory.

== Geography ==
According to the United States Census Bureau, the town has a total area of 6.1 square miles (15.7 km^{2}), of which 5.8 square miles (15.0 km^{2}) is land and 0.3 square mile (0.7 km^{2}) (4.30%) is water. It is the smallest town in Oswego County.

The town is situated along the Oswego River and Oswego Canal.

== Demographics ==
Historical population
Census	Pop.	Note	%±
1920	913		—
1930	856		−6.2%
1940	1,052		22.9%
1950	1,025		−2.6%
1960	1,290		25.9%
1970	1,688		30.9%
1980	1,905		12.9%
1990	1,822		−4.4%
2000	1,663		−8.7%
2010	1,659		−0.2%
2016 (est.)	1,595	▼	−3.9%
U.S. Decennial Census

As of the census of 2000, there were 1,663 people, 635 households, and 499 families residing in the town. The population density was 287.1 inhabitants per square mile (110.8/km^{2}). There were 660 housing units at an average density of 114.0 per square mile (44.0/km^{2}). The racial makeup of the town was 97.78% White, 0.24% Black or African American, 0.12% Native American, 0.66% Asian, 0.48% from other races, and 0.72% from two or more races. Hispanic or Latino of any race were 1.20% of the population.

There were 635 households, out of which 34.5% had children under the age of 18 living with them, 66.5% were married couples living together, 9.3% had a female householder with no husband present, and 21.4% were non-families. 17.3% of all households were made up of individuals, and 7.9% had someone living alone who was 65 years of age or older. The average household size was 2.62 and the average family size was 2.95.

In the town, the population was spread out, with 25.1% under the age of 18, 6.9% from 18 to 24, 26.4% from 25 to 44, 29.8% from 45 to 64, and 11.8% who were 65 years of age or older. The median age was 41 years. For every 100 females, there were 96.1 males. For every 100 females age 18 and over, there were 92.4 males.

The median income for a household in the town was $51,667, and the median income for a family was $61,094. Males had a median income of $54,375 versus $30,227 for females. The per capita income for the town was $23,404. About 3.6% of families and 5.7% of the population were below the poverty line, including 9.2% of those under age 18 and 5.1% of those age 65 or over.

== Communities and locations in Minetto ==
- Minetto – the hamlet of Minetto is the only community in the town.
