= West Monroe, New York =

- Town
- Location in Oswego County and the state of New York.
- Coordinates: 43°17′45″N 76°4′57″W
- Country: United States
- State: New York
- County: Oswego

Area
  - Total: 38.59 sq mi (99.94 km^{2})
  - Land: 33.75 sq mi (87.40 km^{2})
  - Water: 4.84 sq mi (12.54 km^{2})
- Elevation: 446 ft (136 m)

Population (2010)
  - Total: 4,252
  - Estimate (2016): 4,149
  - Density: 122.9/sq mi (47.47/km^{2})
- Time zone: UTC-5 (Eastern (EST))
  - Summer (DST): UTC-4 (EDT)
- ZIP code: 13167
- Area code: 315
- FIPS code: 36-80500
- GNIS feature ID: 0979623
- Website: https://westmonroeny.gov/

West Monroe is a town in Oswego County, New York, United States. The population was 4,252 at the 2010 census.

The Town of West Monroe is in the southeastern part of the county.

The area was first settled by non Indigenous people in 1806, when four farmers bought land from George Scriba for $2 – 2.50 per acre. Thirty-three years later, the town was established on March 21, 1839, from the town of Constantia, and by 1850 had 1197 residents.

== Geography ==
The town's boundaries traverse Oneida Lake, with the town's southern boundary located at the mean high-water mark on the south shore of Oneida Lake.

According to the United States Census Bureau, the town has a total area of 38.5 square miles (100 km^{2}), of which 33.7 square miles (87 km^{2}) is land and 4.8 square miles (12 km^{2}) (12.48%) is water.

== Demographics ==
Historical population
Census	Pop.	Note	%±
1840	918		—
1850	1,197		30.4%
1860	1,416		18.3%
1870	1,304		−7.9%
1880	1,314		0.8%
1890	1,100		−16.3%
1900	936		−14.9%
1910	915		−2.2%
1920	782		−14.5%
1930	666		−14.8%
1940	731		9.8%
1950	1,002		37.1%
1960	1,417		41.4%
1970	2,535		78.9%
1980	3,482		37.4%
1990	4,393		26.2%
2000	4,428		0.8%
2010	4,252		−4.0%
2016 (est.)	4,149		−2.4%
U.S. Decennial Census

As of the census of 2000, there were 4,428 people, 1,579 households, and 1,206 families residing in the town. The population density was 131.3 inhabitants per square mile (50.7/km^{2}). There were 1,765 housing units at an average density of 52.3 per square mile (20.2/km^{2}). The racial makeup of the town was 97.38% White, 0.14% African American, 0.68% Native American, 0.34% Asian, 0.02% Pacific Islander, 0.18% from other races, and 1.26% from two or more races. Hispanic or Latino of any race were 0.36% of the population.

There were 1,579 households, out of which 39.0% had children under the age of 18 living with them, 61.9% were married couples living together, 8.9% had a female householder with no husband present, and 23.6% were non-families. 16.7% of all households were made up of individuals, and 5.0% had someone living alone who was 65 years of age or older. The average household size was 2.80 and the average family size was 3.16.

In the town, the population was spread out, with 29.2% under the age of 18, 7.0% from 18 to 24, 33.2% from 25 to 44, 23.4% from 45 to 64, and 7.2% who were 65 years of age or older. The median age was 35 years. For every 100 females, there were 108.8 males. For every 100 females age 18 and over, there were 105.4 males.

The median income for a household in the town was $42,043, and the median income for a family was $47,019. Males had a median income of $34,306 versus $25,489 for females. The per capita income for the town was $16,534. About 9.6% of families and 11.8% of the population were below the poverty line, including 14.7% of those under age 18 and 10.8% of those age 65 or over.

== Notable people ==
- Hadwen C. Fuller, former US Congressman
- Tom Murphy, professional baseball player

== Communities and locations in West Monroe ==
- Gulf Bridge –
- Little France –
- Mallory – A hamlet on the western town line.
- Mud Settlement –
- Toad Harbor – A hamlet on the shore of Oneida Lake.
- Union Settlement –
- Vorhees Corners – A hamlet on the town line in the northwestern corner of the town.
- West Monroe –
- Whig Hill –
