= Constantia, New York =

Constantia
- Town
- Location in Oswego County and the state of New York.
- Coordinates: 43°14′52″N 76°00′00″W
- Country: United States
- State: New York
- County: Oswego

Area
  - Total: 99.67 sq mi (258.15 km^{2})
  - Land: 56.76 sq mi (147.02 km^{2})
  - Water: 42.91 sq mi (111.13 km^{2}) 42.93%

Population (2010)
  - Total: 4,973
  - Estimate (2016): 4,856
  - Density: 85.5/sq mi (33.03/km^{2})
- Time zone: UTC-5 (Eastern (EST))
  - Summer (DST): UTC-4 (EDT)
- FIPS code: 36-075-17904
- Website: constantiany.gov

Constantia is a town in Oswego County, New York, United States. The population was 4,973 at the 2010 census. The town is located in the southeastern part of the county. Within the town is a hamlet and census-designated place of the same name.

== History ==
The town was first settled circa 1793 and was known then as "Rotterdam." Francis Adrian Vanderkemp and Marc Isambard Brunel were two of its citizens. The Town of Constantia was created from part of the Town of Mexico in 1808. In 1825, the town was reduced by the formation of the Town of Hastings, and was reduced again in 1839 to form the Town of West Monroe.

== Geography ==
According to the United States Census Bureau, the town has a total area of 99.6 square miles (258.0 km^{2}), of which 56.9 square miles (147.3 km^{2}) is land and 42.8 square miles (110.8 km^{2}) (42.93%) is water.

The southern town line is the opposite shore of Oneida Lake, which is the border of Madison County. The eastern town line is the border of Oneida County.

The Erie Canal, runs through the town, using Oneida Lake as a waterway.

The north boundary is marked by the south edge of the Tug Hill Plateau.

== Demographics ==
Historical population
Census	Pop.	Note	%±
1820	767		—
1830	1,193		55.5%
1840	1,476		23.7%
1850	2,495		69.0%
1860	3,413		36.8%
1870	3,437		0.7%
1880	3,124		−9.1%
1890	2,691		−13.9%
1900	2,259		−16.1%
1910	2,023		−10.4%
1920	1,789		−11.6%
1930	1,405		−21.5%
1940	1,538		9.5%
1950	1,947		26.6%
1960	2,730		40.2%
1970	3,547		29.9%
1980	4,312		21.6%
1990	4,868		12.9%
2000	5,141		5.6%
2010	4,973		−3.3%
2016 (est.)	4,856	▼	−2.4%
U.S. Decennial Census

As of the census of 2000, there were 5,141 people, 1,893 households, and 1,398 families residing in the town. The population density was 90.4 inhabitants per square mile (34.9/km^{2}). There were 2,351 housing units at an average density of 41.3 per square mile (15.9/km^{2}). The racial makeup of the town was 98.29% White, 0.21% Black or African American, 0.66% Native American, 0.08% Asian, 0.02% Pacific Islander, 0.08% from other races, and 0.66% from two or more races. Hispanic or Latino of any race were 0.33% of the population.

There were 1,893 households, out of which 37.3% had children under the age of 18 living with them, 61.0% were married couples living together, 8.1% had a female householder with no husband present, and 26.1% were non-families. 19.0% of all households were made up of individuals, and 6.0% had someone living alone who was 65 years of age or older. The average household size was 2.72 and the average family size was 3.11.

In the town, the population was spread out, with 28.4% under the age of 18, 5.7% from 18 to 24, 31.5% from 25 to 44, 24.7% from 45 to 64, and 9.6% who were 65 years of age or older. The median age was 37 years. For every 100 females, there were 106.5 males. For every 100 females age 18 and over, there were 103.7 males.

The median income for a household in the town was $39,932, and the median income for a family was $45,373. Males had a median income of $31,276 versus $23,299 for females. The per capita income for the town was $15,818. About 6.2% of families and 9.5% of the population were below the poverty line, including 10.7% of those under age 18 and 3.6% of those age 65 or over.

== Communities and locations in Constantia ==
- Bernhards Bay – A hamlet on the shore of Oneida Lake.
- Cleveland – The Village of Cleveland is on the northern shore of Oneida Lake, on Route 49.
- Carroll Corners – A location between Gay Corners and Dutcherville.
- Constantia – The hamlet of Constantia is on the shore of Oneida Lake on Route 49. The community was incorporated as a village in 1837, but abandoned that status in 1923.
- Constantia Center – A hamlet northwest of Cleveland.
- Doris Park – A hamlet on the shore of Oneida Lake, southwest of Constantia village.
- Dutcherville – A hamlet north of Nicholsville.
- Gayville – A hamlet north of Constantia village.
- Halls Corners – A location east of North Constantia by the northern town line.
- Nicholsville – A hamlet northeast of Constantia village.
- North Constantia – A hamlet north of Gayville.
- Panther Lake – A hamlet and resort north of Bernhards Bay.
- Panther Lake – A lake located by the hamlet of Panther Lake.
