= Parish, New York =

Parish
- Town
- Location in Oswego County and the state of New York.

- Location of New York in the United States
- Coordinates: 43°24′36″N 76°03′58″W
- Country: United States
- State: New York
- County: Oswego County
- Incorporated: 1828

Area
  - Total: 42 sq mi (109 km^{2})
  - Land: 42 sq mi (108 km^{2})
  - Water: 0.20 sq mi (0.52 km^{2})
- Elevation: 495 ft (151 m)

Population (2010)
  - Total: 2,558
  - Estimate (2016): 2,463
  - Density: 59/sq mi (22.8/km^{2})
- Time zone: UTC-5 (EST)
  - Summer (DST): UTC-4 (EDT)
- ZIP code: 13131
- Area code: 315
- FIPS code: 36-56352
- Website: https://townofparish-ny.us/

Parish is a town in Oswego County, New York, United States. The population was 2,558 at the 2010 census.

The Town of Parish was created from the Town of Mexico in 1828. There is a village called Parish in the town.

== Geography ==
According to the United States Census Bureau, the town has a total area of 42.0 square miles (109 km^{2}), of which 41.8 square miles (108 km^{2}) is land and 0.2 square miles (0.52 km^{2}) (0.45%) is water.

== Demographics ==
Historical population
| Census | Pop. | Note | %± |
|---|---|---|---|
| 1830 | 968 | | — |
| 1840 | 1,543 | | 59.4% |
| 1850 | 1,799 | | 16.6% |
| 1860 | 2,027 | | 12.7% |
| 1870 | 1,929 | | −4.8% |
| 1880 | 1,817 | | −5.8% |
| 1890 | 1,770 | | −2.6% |
| 1900 | 1,530 | | −13.6% |
| 1910 | 1,311 | | −14.3% |
| 1920 | 1,265 | | −3.5% |
| 1930 | 1,249 | | −1.3% |
| 1940 | 1,199 | | −4.0% |
| 1950 | 1,264 | | 5.4% |
| 1960 | 1,439 | | 13.8% |
| 1970 | 1,782 | | 23.8% |
| 1980 | 2,172 | | 21.9% |
| 1990 | 2,425 | | 11.6% |
| 2000 | 2,694 | | 11.1% |
| 2010 | 2,558 | | −5.0% |
| 2016 (est.) | 2,463 | ▼ | −3.7% |
U.S. Decennial Census

As of the census of 2000, there were 2,694 people, 955 households, and 741 families residing in the town. The population density was 64.5 inhabitants per square mile (24.9/km^{2}). There were 1,034 housing units at an average density of 24.8 per square mile (9.6/km^{2}). The racial makeup of the town was 98.63% White, 0.37% Black or African American, 0.37% Native American, 0.07% Asian, 0.04% from other races, and 0.52% from two or more races. Hispanic or Latino of any race were 0.52% of the population.

There were 955 households, out of which 39.3% had children under the age of 18 living with them, 61.8% were married couples living together, 9.4% had a female householder with no husband present, and 22.4% were non-families. 17.5% of all households were made up of individuals, and 7.3% had someone living alone who was 65 years of age or older. The average household size was 2.82 and the average family size was 3.14.

In the town, the population was spread out, with 29.8% under the age of 18, 7.2% from 18 to 24, 31.4% from 25 to 44, 22.1% from 45 to 64, and 9.4% who were 65 years of age or older. The median age was 35 years. For every 100 females, there were 99.6 males. For every 100 females age 18 and over, there were 99.4 males.

The median income for a household in the town was $37,802, and the median income for a family was $40,926. Males had a median income of $36,667 versus $21,509 for females. The per capita income for the town was $16,149. About 11.2% of families and 12.7% of the population were below the poverty line, including 17.1% of those under age 18 and 3.1% of those age 65 or over.

== Communities and locations in the Town of Parish ==
- Parish – The Village of Parish.
