= Hannibal, New York =

Hannibal
- Town
- Location in Oswego County and the state of New York.

- Location of New York in the United States
- Coordinates: 43°19′10″N 76°34′40″W
- Country: United States
- State: New York
- County: Oswego County
- Incorporated: 1806

Area
  - Total: 45 sq mi (116 km^{2})
  - Land: 45 sq mi (116 km^{2})
  - Water: 0.039 sq mi (0.1 km^{2})
- Elevation: 328 ft (100 m)

Population (2010)
  - Total: 4,854
  - Estimate (2016): 4,631
  - Density: 103/sq mi (39.9/km^{2})
- Time zone: UTC-5 (EST)
  - Summer (DST): UTC-4 (EDT)
- ZIP code: 13074
- Area code: 315
- FIPS code: 36-32028
- Website: https://hannibalny.org/

Hannibal is a town in Oswego County, New York, United States. The population was 4,854 at the 2010 census. The name is derived from the hero of ancient Carthage, Hannibal.

The Town of Hannibal also contains a village also called Hannibal. The town is located on the western border of the county.

== History ==
The first settlement took place circa 1802. Much of the region was purchased from the Onondaga and Oneida tribes to form the Central New York Military Tract to pay off war veterans. The town was formed in 1806 from the Town of Lysander while still part of Onondaga County, New York. The name was provided by Robert Harpur, an employee of the New York survey, who is responsible for many of the "classical" names applied to political entities in the central part of New York.

== Geography ==
According to the United States Census Bureau, the town has a total area of 44.8 square miles (116.0 km^{2}), of which 44.8 square miles (116.0 km^{2}) is land and 0.04 square mile (0.1 km^{2}) (0.04%) is water.

The west town line is the border of Cayuga County.

== Demographics ==
Historical population
| Census | Pop. | Note | %± |
|---|---|---|---|
| 1820 | 935 | | — |
| 1830 | 1,794 | | 91.9% |
| 1840 | 2,269 | | 26.5% |
| 1850 | 3,368 | | 48.4% |
| 1860 | 3,246 | | −3.6% |
| 1870 | 3,234 | | −0.4% |
| 1880 | 3,173 | | −1.9% |
| 1890 | 2,688 | | −15.3% |
| 1900 | 2,473 | | −8.0% |
| 1910 | 2,148 | | −13.1% |
| 1920 | 1,834 | | −14.6% |
| 1930 | 1,855 | | 1.1% |
| 1940 | 2,010 | | 8.4% |
| 1950 | 2,230 | | 10.9% |
| 1960 | 2,673 | | 19.9% |
| 1970 | 3,165 | | 18.4% |
| 1980 | 4,027 | | 27.2% |
| 1990 | 4,616 | | 14.6% |
| 2000 | 4,957 | | 7.4% |
| 2010 | 4,854 | | −2.1% |
| 2016 (est.) | 4,631 | ▼ | −4.6% |
U.S. Decennial Census

As of the census of 2000, there were 4,956 people, 1,760 households, and 1,307 families residing in the town. The population density was 110.7 inhabitants per square mile (42.7/km^{2}). There were 1,962 housing units at an average density of 43.8 per square mile (16.9/km^{2}). The racial makeup of the town was 98.00% White, 0.22% Black or African American, 0.44% Native American, 0.12% Asian, 0.46% from other races, and 0.75% from two or more races. Hispanic or Latino of any race were 0.89% of the population.

There were 1,760 households, out of which 41.1% had children under the age of 18 living with them, 56.3% were married couples living together, 11.7% had a female householder with no husband present, and 25.7% were non-families. 18.6% of all households were made up of individuals, and 7.2% had someone living alone who was 65 years of age or older. The average household size was 2.81 and the average family size was 3.16.

In the town, the population was spread out, with 30.5% under the age of 18, 8.3% from 18 to 24, 30.5% from 25 to 44, 22.2% from 45 to 64, and 8.4% who were 65 years of age or older. The median age was 34 years. For every 100 females, there were 101.3 males. For every 100 females age 18 and over, there were 99.6 males.

The median income for a household in the town was $35,278, and the median income for a family was $38,355. Males had a median income of $33,083 versus $23,667 for females. The per capita income for the town was $16,344. About 13.6% of families and 15.3% of the population were below the poverty line, including 20.3% of those under age 18 and 17.4% of those age 65 or over.

== Communities and locations in the Town of Hannibal ==
- Bethel – A hamlet along Route 34 at the Ira town line
- Cains Corners – A hamlet southwest of Hannibal village.
- Dexterville – A location at the eastern town line.
- Fairdale – A hamlet east of Hannibal village.
- Hannibal – Village of Hannibal is in the western part of the town on Route 104.
- Hannibal Center – A hamlet southeast of Hannibal village.
- Kinney Corners – A location near the northern town line on Route 104.
- Metcalf Siding – A location northwest of North Hannibal.
- North Hannibal – A hamlet northeast of Hannibal village, located on County Route 7.
- South Hannibal – A hamlet southeast of Hannibal Center and located on Route 176. The community was also known as "Hulls Corners."
