= New Haven, New York =

- Town
- Location in Oswego County and the state of New York.
- Coordinates: 43°28′58″N 76°18′36″W
- Country: United States
- State: New York
- County: Oswego

Area
  - Total: 33.41 sq mi (86.54 km^{2})
  - Land: 31.10 sq mi (80.54 km^{2})
  - Water: 2.32 sq mi (6.00 km^{2})
- Elevation: 420 ft (128 m)

Population (2010)
  - Total: 2,856
  - Estimate (2016): 2,835
  - Density: 91/sq mi (35.2/km^{2})
- Time zone: UTC-5 (Eastern (EST))
  - Summer (DST): UTC-4 (EDT)
- ZIP code: 13121
- Area code: 315
- FIPS code: 36-50342
- GNIS feature ID: 0979265
- Website: https://newhavenny.gov/

New Haven is a town in Oswego County, New York, United States. The population was 2,856 at the 2010 census.

== History ==
The area was originally called "Vera Cruz." The Town of New Haven was taken from the Town of Mexico in 1813, before the founding of Oswego County.

== Geography ==
According to the United States Census Bureau, the town has a total area of 33.5 square miles (87 km^{2}), of which 31.2 square miles (81 km^{2}) is land and 2.3 square miles (6.0 km^{2}) (6.79%) is water.

The northern town line is formed by Lake Ontario.

== Demographics ==
Historical population
Census	Pop.	Note	%±
1820	1,590		—
1830	1,410		−11.3%
1840	1,737		23.2%
1850	2,015		16.0%
1860	2,073		2.9%
1870	1,764		−14.9%
1880	1,713		−2.9%
1890	1,557		−9.1%
1900	1,408		−9.6%
1910	1,461		3.8%
1920	1,256		−14.0%
1930	1,116		−11.1%
1940	1,194		7.0%
1950	1,259		5.4%
1960	1,478		17.4%
1970	1,845		24.8%
1980	2,421		31.2%
1990	2,778		14.7%
2000	2,930		5.5%
2010	2,856		−2.5%
2016 (est.)	2,835		−0.7%
U.S. Decennial Census

As of the census of 2000, there were 2,930 people, 1,063 households, and 781 families residing in the town. The population density was 94.0 inhabitants per square mile (36.3/km^{2}). There were 1,378 housing units at an average density of 44.2 per square mile (17.1/km^{2}). The racial makeup of the town was 98.40% White, 0.17% African American, 0.48% Native American, 0.41% Asian, 0.14% from other races, and 0.41% from two or more races. Hispanic or Latino of any race were 0.89% of the population.

There were 1,063 households, out of which 39.0% had children under the age of 18 living with them, 59.5% were married couples living together, 8.6% had a female householder with no husband present, and 26.5% were non-families. 19.9% of all households were made up of individuals, and 5.6% had someone living alone who was 65 years of age or older. The average household size was 2.76 and the average family size was 3.19.

In the town, the population was spread out, with 29.4% under the age of 18, 7.6% from 18 to 24, 30.8% from 25 to 44, 23.9% from 45 to 64, and 8.3% who were 65 years of age or older. The median age was 34 years. For every 100 females, there were 100.1 males. For every 100 females age 18 and over, there were 96.6 males.

The median income for a household in the town was $40,324, and the median income for a family was $44,900. Males had a median income of $36,042 versus $21,632 for females. The per capita income for the town was $16,957. About 7.2% of families and 11.3% of the population were below the poverty line, including 16.4% of those under age 18 and 2.1% of those age 65 or over.

== Communities and locations in New Haven ==
- Austin Corners – A location in the southeastern corner of the town.
- Butterfly Corners ("Butterfly") – A hamlet in the eastern part of the town.
- Cummings Bridge ("Cummings Mills") – A location in the southeastern corner of the town.
- Demster – A hamlet north of New Haven village on Route 6.
- Demster Beach – A hamlet on the Lake Ontario shore.
- Hickory Grove – A location on the shore of Lake Ontario.
- Johnsons Corners – A location in the southeastern corner of the town.
- New Haven – The hamlet of New Haven is on Route 104. It was once called "Gay Head."
- New Haven Station – A location north of New Haven village.
- Pleasant Point Crossing ("Pleasant Point") – A hamlet west of Demster.
- Sala – A hamlet near the southern town line, southwest of South New Haven.
- South New Haven – A hamlet southwest of New Haven village.
- Vermillion – A hamlet on the southern town line, south of Butterfly Corners.
