= Volney, New York =

- Town
- Flag

- Location in Oswego County and the state of New York.
- Coordinates: 43°20′40″N 76°23′34″W
- Country: United States
- State: New York
- County: Oswego

Area
  - Total: 49.15 sq mi (127.31 km^{2})
  - Land: 48.25 sq mi (124.96 km^{2})
  - Water: 0.91 sq mi (2.36 km^{2})
- Elevation: 479 ft (146 m)

Population (2010)
  - Total: 5,926
  - Estimate (2016): 5,732
  - Density: 118.8/sq mi (45.87/km^{2})
- Time zone: UTC-5 (Eastern (EST))
  - Summer (DST): UTC-4 (EDT)
- ZIP code: 13069 & 13126
- Area code: 315
- FIPS code: 36-77662
- GNIS feature ID: 0979589
- Website: Town website

Volney is a town in Oswego County, New York, United States. The population was 5,926 at the 2010 census. The town was named after a French author, Constantin François de Chassebœuf, comte de Volney, who toured the area in 1808.

The Town of Volney is centrally located in the county.

== History ==
The Town of Volney was formed from part of the Town of Mexico in 1806. The original name of the town was Fredericksburgh, which was changed to Volney in 1811.

The First Congregational Church and Society of Volney was listed on the National Register of Historic Places in 2001.

== Geography ==
The western town border is marked by the Oswego River.

According to the United States Census Bureau, the town has a total area of 49.2 square miles (127 km^{2}) or 31,488 acres, of which 48.3 square miles (125 km^{2}) is land and 0.9 square miles (2.3 km^{2}) (1.73%) is water.

== Demographics ==
Historical population
Census	Pop.	Note	%±
1820	1,691		—
1830	3,629		114.6%
1840	3,155		−13.1%
1850	2,966		−6.0%
1860	8,045		171.2%
1870	6,565		−18.4%
1880	6,588		0.4%
1890	2,313		−64.9%
1900	2,393		3.5%
1910	2,407		0.6%
1920	1,995		−17.1%
1930	2,347		17.6%
1940	2,659		13.3%
1950	3,106		16.8%
1960	3,785		21.9%
1970	4,520		19.4%
1980	5,358		18.5%
1990	5,676		5.9%
2000	6,094		7.4%
2010	5,926		−2.8%
2016 (est.)	5,732		−3.3%
U.S. Decennial Census

As of the census of 2000, there were 6,094 people, 2,188 households, and 1,686 families residing in the town. The population density was 126.2 inhabitants per square mile (48.7/km^{2}). There were 2,333 housing units at an average density of 48.3 per square mile (18.6/km^{2}). The racial makeup of the town was 98.08% White, 0.26% African American, 0.30% Native American, 0.28% Asian, 0.05% Pacific Islander, 0.21% from other races, and 0.82% from two or more races. Hispanic or Latino of any race were 0.69% of the population.

There were 2,188 households, out of which 38.8% had children under the age of 18 living with them, 61.4% were married couples living together, 9.0% had a female householder with no husband present, and 22.9% were non-families. 17.4% of all households were made up of individuals, and 6.0% had someone living alone who was 65 years of age or older. The average household size was 2.79 and the average family size was 3.11.

In the town, the population was spread out, with 28.3% under the age of 18, 8.2% from 18 to 24, 29.9% from 25 to 44, 24.0% from 45 to 64, and 9.6% who were 65 years of age or older. The median age was 36 years. For every 100 females, there were 104.0 males. For every 100 females age 18 and over, there were 103.0 males.

The median income for a household in the town was $43,532, and the median income for a family was $46,408. Males had a median income of $40,585 versus $25,974 for females. The per capita income for the town was $19,029. About 3.9% of families and 6.2% of the population were below the poverty line, including 5.9% of those under age 18 and 3.6% of those age 65 or over.

== Communities and locations in Volney ==
- Bundy Crossing – A hamlet in the northern part of the town near the Oswego River.
- Drakes Corner – A hamlet north of Volney village on Route 6.
- Farley Corners – A hamlet by the eastern town line.
- Fulton – Part of the ZIP code for the City of Fulton overlaps the town.
- Ingalls Crossing – A hamlet in the southeastern part of the town.
- North Volney – A hamlet north of Drakes Corner on Route 6.
- Oswego County Airport (FZY) – east of Fulton.
- Seneca Hill – A location in the northwestern corner of the town by the Oswego River.
- Volney – The hamlet of Volney is near the center of the town and east of Fulton, New York on Routes NY-3 and 6.

== Notable person ==
- Horace B. Willard, Wisconsin physician, businessman, and politician, was born in Volney.
