= Oswego County, New York =

County in New York, United States

- County
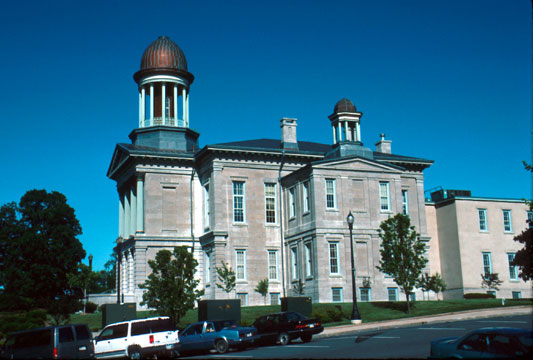
- Oswego County Courthouse

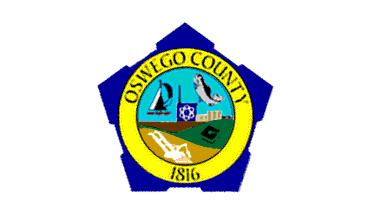
- Flag Seal

- Location within the U.S. state of New York
- Coordinates: 43°28′N 76°12′W
- Country: United States
- State: New York
- Founded: 1816
- Seat: Oswego
- Largest city: Oswego

Government
  - County administrator: Philip Church

Area
  - Total: 1,312 sq mi (3,400 km^{2})
  - Land: 952 sq mi (2,470 km^{2})
  - Water: 360 sq mi (930 km^{2}) 27%

Population (2020)
  - Total: 117,525
  - Estimate (2025): 118,569 ▲
  - Density: 123.5/sq mi (47.7/km^{2})
- Time zone: UTC−5 (Eastern)
  - Summer (DST): UTC−4 (EDT)
- Congressional district: 24th
- Website: https://www.oswegocountyny.gov/

Oswego County is a county in the U.S. state of New York. As of the 2020 United States census, the population was 117,525. The county seat is Oswego. The county name is from a Mohawk-language word meaning 'the pouring out place', referring to the point at which the Oswego River feeds into Lake Ontario at the northern edge of the county in the city of Oswego. The county is part of the Central New York region of the state.

Oswego County is part of the Syracuse metropolitan area.

== History ==
When counties were established in the British colony of New York in 1683, the present Oswego County was part of Albany County. This was an enormous county, including the northern part of what is now New York state as well as all of the present state of Vermont and, in theory, extending westward to the Pacific Ocean. This county was reduced in size on July 3, 1766, by the creation of Cumberland County in the British colony, and further on March 16, 1770, by the creation of Gloucester County, both containing territory now in Vermont.

On March 12, 1772, what was left of Albany County was split into three parts, one remaining under the name Albany County. One of the other pieces, Tryon County, contained the western portion (and thus, since no western boundary was specified, theoretically still extended west to the Pacific). The eastern boundary of Tryon County was approximately five miles (8.0 km) west of the present city of Schenectady, and the county included the western part of the Adirondack Mountains and the area west of the West Branch of the Delaware River. The area then designated as Tryon County now includes 37 counties of New York State. The county was named for William Tryon, colonial governor of New York.

In the years prior to 1776, most of the Loyalists in Tryon County fled to Canada. In 1784, following the peace treaty that ended the American Revolutionary War, the name of Tryon County was changed to Montgomery County to honor the general, Richard Montgomery, who had captured several places in Canada and died attempting to capture the city of Quebec, replacing the name of the hated British governor.

In 1789, the size of Montgomery County was reduced by the splitting off of Ontario County from Montgomery. The actual area split off from Montgomery County was much larger than the present county, also including the present Allegany, Cattaraugus, Chautauqua, Erie, Genesee, Livingston, Monroe, Niagara, Orleans, Steuben, Wyoming, Yates, and part of Schuyler and Wayne counties.

Oswego County was partly in Macomb's Purchase of 1791.

In 1791, Herkimer County was one of three counties split off from Montgomery (the other two being Otsego, and Tioga County). This was much larger than the present county, however, and was reduced by a number of subsequent splits.

In 1794, Onondaga County was created from a part of Herkimer County. This county was larger than the current Onondaga County, including the present Cayuga, Cortland, and part of Oswego counties.

In 1798, Oneida County was created from a part of Herkimer County. This county was larger than the current Oneida County, including the present Jefferson, Lewis, and part of Oswego counties.

In 1805, Oneida County was reduced in size by the splitting off of Jefferson and Lewis counties.

In 1816, Oswego County was created as New York State's 48th county from parts of Oneida and Onondaga counties.

In 1841, businessmen in Oswego attempted to divide Oswego County into two counties. They failed to persuade the State to do so, however. Occasionally, the topic still resurfaces today by dividing the county into an east part and a west part, with the east portion being renamed "Salmon County".

At various times, beginning in 1847 and as late as 1975, attempts were made to move the county seat to the Village of Mexico. However, none of these attempts succeeded.

On April 20, 2002, at around 6:50 am, many residents of Oswego County were shaken awake by a magnitude 5.2 earthquake centered near Plattsburgh, New York. Minor damage to a Fire Hall in Altmar was the only report of damage. No injuries were sustained.

During February 1–12, 2007, a major lake effect snowfall dumped over 10 feet (3 m) of snow in many places in Oswego County, resulting in several roof collapses, some communities being cut off, and some people being snowed-in in their homes. A state of emergency was declared for the county, and the National Guard was sent in to help clear the snow.

== Geography ==
According to the U.S. Census Bureau, the county has a total area of 1,312 square miles (3,400 km^{2}), of which 952 square miles (2,470 km^{2}) is land and 360 square miles (930 km^{2}), comprising 27%, is water.

Oswego County is in northwestern New York State, just north of Syracuse and northwest of Utica, on the eastern shore of Lake Ontario. Part of the Tug Hill Plateau is in the eastern part of the county and, at 1,550 feet (470 m), is the highest point. The Salmon River Falls, a 110-foot (34 m) waterfall, is a popular sightseeing destination in the northeastern portion of the county.

There are two harbors in the county: Oswego Harbor at the mouth of the Oswego River and Port Ontario on the Salmon River. The first major port of call on the Great Lakes is the Port of Oswego Authority dock.

=== Adjacent counties ===
- Jefferson County – north
- Lewis County – northeast
- Oneida County – east
- Madison County – southeast
- Onondaga County – south
- Cayuga County – southwest

=== Major highways ===
- Interstate 81
- U.S. Route 11
- New York State Route 3
- New York State Route 13
- New York State Route 48
- New York State Route 49
- New York State Route 69
- New York State Route 104
- New York State Route 104B
- New York State Route 481 (Veterans Memorial Highway)

== Demographics ==
Historical population
Census	Pop.	Note	%±
1820	12,374		—
1830	27,119		119.2%
1840	43,619		60.8%
1850	62,198		42.6%
1860	75,958		22.1%
1870	77,941		2.6%
1880	77,911		0.0%
1890	71,883		−7.7%
1900	70,881		−1.4%
1910	71,664		1.1%
1920	71,045		−0.9%
1930	69,645		−2.0%
1940	71,275		2.3%
1950	77,181		8.3%
1960	86,118		11.6%
1970	100,897		17.2%
1980	113,901		12.9%
1990	121,771		6.9%
2000	122,377		0.5%
2010	122,109		−0.2%
2020	117,525		−3.8%
2025 (est.)	118,569	▲	0.9%
U.S. Decennial Census; 1790–1960 1900–1990; 1990–2000 2010–2019

Oswego County is also home to two colleges: State University of New York at Oswego in the Town of Oswego and the Fulton Branch Campus of Cayuga County Community College in the City of Fulton.

=== 2020 census ===
Oswego County, New York – Racial and ethnic composition Note: the US Census treats Hispanic/Latino as an ethnic category. This table excludes Latinos from the racial categories and assigns them to a separate category. Hispanics/Latinos may be of any race.
Race / Ethnicity (NH = Non-Hispanic)	Pop 1980	Pop 1990	Pop 2000	Pop 2010	Pop 2020	% 1980	% 1990	% 2000	% 2010	% 2020
White alone (NH)	112,146	119,132	118,110	116,091	105,710	98.46%	97.83%	96.51%	95.07%	89.95%
Black or African American alone (NH)	423	578	674	862	1,370	0.37%	0.47%	0.55%	0.71%	1.17%
Native American or Alaska Native alone (NH)	308	417	461	465	457	0.27%	0.34%	0.38%	0.38%	0.39%
Asian alone (NH)	349	454	498	709	870	0.31%	0.37%	0.41%	0.58%	0.74%
Native Hawaiian or Pacific Islander alone (NH)	x	x	16	14	19	x	x	0.01%	0.01%	0.02%
Other race alone (NH)	79	31	48	59	302	0.07%	0.03%	0.04%	0.05%	0.26%
Mixed race or Multiracial (NH)	x	x	978	1,357	5,181	x	x	0.80%	1.11%	4.41%
Hispanic or Latino (any race)	596	1,159	1,592	2,552	3,616	0.52%	0.95%	1.30%	2.09%	3.08%
Total	113,901	121,771	122,377	122,109	117,525	100.00%	100.00%	100.00%	100.00%	100.00%

=== 2000 ===
As of the census of 2000, there were 122,377 people, 45,522 households, and 31,228 families residing in the county. The population density was 128 inhabitants per square mile (49/km^{2}). There were 52,831 housing units at an average density of 55 units per square mile (21/km^{2}). The racial makeup of the county was 97.17% White, 0.59% Black or African American, 0.41% Native American, 0.42% Asian, 0.01% Pacific Islander, 0.48% from other races, and 0.93% from two or more races. Hispanic or Latino of any race were 1.30% of the population. 15.5% were of Irish, 14.0% German, 13.7% Italian, 13.3% English, 9.6% American, 7.9% French and 5.3% Polish ancestry according to Census 2000. 96.2% spoke English and 1.7% Spanish as their first language.

There were 45,522 households, out of which 35.00% had children under the age of 18 living with them, 52.80% were married couples living together, 10.80% had a female householder with no husband present, and 31.40% were non-families. 24.30% of all households were made up of individuals, and 9.70% had someone living alone who was 65 years of age or older. The average household size was 2.60 and the average family size was 3.08.

In the county, the population was spread out, with 26.80% under the age of 18, 10.90% from 18 to 24, 28.90% from 25 to 44, 22.10% from 45 to 64, and 11.30% who were 65 years of age or older. The median age was 35 years. For every 100 females there were 97.50 males. For every 100 females age 18 and over, there were 94.40 males.

The median income for a household in the county was $36,598, and the median income for a family was $43,821. Males had a median income of $34,976 versus $23,938 for females. The per capita income for the county was $16,853. About 9.70% of families and 14.00% of the population were below the poverty line, including 17.10% of those under age 18 and 9.50% of those age 65 or over.

== Communities ==
A map of towns, cities and villages in Oswego County, New York

Oswego County has 22 towns, 2 cities, and 10 villages.

=== Larger settlements ===
#	Location	Population	Type	Area
1	†Oswego	18,142	City	Lake Shore
2	Fulton	11,896	City	Riverbank
3	‡Brewerton	4,029	CDP	Lake Oneida
4	SUNY Oswego	3,541	CDP	Lake Shore
5	Phoenix	2,382	Village	Riverbank
6	Pulaski	2,365	Village	Lake Shore
7	Central Square	1,848	Village	Lake Oneida
8	Mexico	1,624	Village	Lake Shore
9	Constantia	1,182	CDP	Lake Oneida
10	Minetto	1,069	CDP	Riverbank
11	Sand Ridge	849	CDP	Riverbank
12	Sandy Creek	771	Village	Lake Shore
13	Cleveland	750	Village	Lake Oneida
14	Lacona	582	Village	Lake Shore
15	Hannibal	555	Village	Riverbank
16	Parish	450	Village	East
17	††Altmar	407	CDP	East

† - County seat

†† - Former village

‡ - Not wholly in this county

=== Towns ===
- Albion
- Amboy
- Boylston
- Constantia
- Granby
- Hannibal
- Hastings
- Mexico
- Minetto
- New Haven
- Orwell
- Oswego
- Palermo
- Parish
- Redfield
- Richland
- Sandy Creek
- Schroeppel
- Scriba
- Volney
- West Monroe
- Williamstown

=== Nature ===
The Lake Ontario National Marine Sanctuary lies in the waters of southeastern Lake Ontario off Oswego County.

Swimming places in the county include

on Lake Ontario

- Selkirk Shores State Park
- Sandy Island Beach State Park
- Mexico Point State Park
- Salmon River Lighthouse and Marina (Selkirk Light?)

Swimming on Oneida Lake:

- Taft Bay Park at Bernhards Bay, New York, and other swimming on Oneida Lake. Oswego County includes the majority of the northern shore of the lake, running east to the hamlet of Cleveland, New York. It also includes all of the lake surface from the north shore to the south shore, which is the northern edge of Onondaga and Madison counties. So swimming out from beaches on the southern shore, even, puts you in Oswego County. Oswego County runs east along the south shore almost to the hamlet of Lakeport.

Pool swimming include:

- Brennan Beach RV Resort
- Gallager Pool in Oswego
- Scriba Town Park
- Fulton City Pools

== Economy ==
Oswego's economy is most prominent as industry; in 2012, manufactured shipments made up $2.1 billion of the local economy. Retail made up the next most prominent sector, totaling $1.2 billion or more than $10,000 per resident. Wholesale merchants also made $368 million sales the same year. Services made up the final total, equal to over $500 million in food service, healthcare, accommodation, and social services.

== Media ==
Sample News Group owns and publishes four periodical newspapers in the county, The Palladium-Times, Valley News, Oswego County News and Oswego Shopper. These collectively operate the website OswegoCountyNewsNow.com.

== Government and politics ==
United States presidential election results for Oswego County, New York
Year	Republican		Democratic		Third party(ies)	
Year	No.	%	No.	%	No.	%
1884	9,976	54.71%	7,434	40.77%	825	4.52%
1888	11,296	58.37%	7,429	38.38%	629	3.25%
1892	10,012	56.44%	6,729	37.93%	998	5.63%
1896	11,411	62.81%	6,401	35.23%	356	1.96%
1900	11,160	60.44%	6,605	35.77%	699	3.79%
1904	11,174	60.63%	6,152	33.38%	1,104	5.99%
1908	10,447	58.22%	6,172	34.39%	1,326	7.39%
1912	5,996	37.47%	5,256	32.84%	4,751	29.69%
1916	9,854	57.72%	6,210	36.38%	1,008	5.90%
1920	17,905	66.37%	8,045	29.82%	1,029	3.81%
1924	18,576	65.08%	7,864	27.55%	2,102	7.36%
1928	21,849	64.39%	11,639	34.30%	442	1.30%
1932	18,322	56.90%	13,314	41.35%	565	1.75%
1936	22,803	66.33%	11,068	32.20%	505	1.47%
1940	22,688	62.62%	13,459	37.15%	83	0.23%
1944	19,733	60.99%	12,593	38.92%	29	0.09%
1948	19,095	58.03%	12,820	38.96%	989	3.01%
1952	27,609	70.66%	11,444	29.29%	19	0.05%
1956	29,277	76.87%	8,809	23.13%	0	0.00%
1960	24,013	60.69%	15,544	39.28%	11	0.03%
1964	12,415	33.35%	24,788	66.59%	23	0.06%
1968	20,041	54.39%	14,636	39.72%	2,168	5.88%
1972	29,109	71.84%	11,317	27.93%	92	0.23%
1976	23,949	59.19%	16,332	40.36%	182	0.45%
1980	22,816	53.63%	15,343	36.07%	4,382	10.30%
1984	31,481	68.39%	14,347	31.17%	206	0.45%
1988	25,362	57.37%	18,430	41.69%	419	0.95%
1992	18,530	36.38%	16,990	33.36%	15,411	30.26%
1996	17,159	37.57%	20,440	44.75%	8,074	17.68%
2000	23,249	47.96%	22,857	47.15%	2,373	4.89%
2004	26,325	51.01%	24,133	46.76%	1,149	2.23%
2008	23,571	47.76%	24,777	50.21%	1,001	2.03%
2012	19,980	44.81%	23,515	52.73%	1,096	2.46%
2016	27,688	57.47%	17,095	35.48%	3,397	7.05%
2020	32,142	58.98%	21,145	38.80%	1,211	2.22%
2024	33,548	61.94%	20,483	37.82%	132	0.24%

The Oswego County Legislature has 25 members, elected from equal population districts, reduced from 36 in 1993. The legislators are split between seven committees that meet monthly and also attend a general meeting once per month. The seven standing committees as of December 2019 were Government, Courts and Consumer Affairs; Public Safety; Infrastructure, Facilities and Technology; Economic Development and Planning; Health; Human Services; and Finance and Personnel.

In the 2019 general election, the county GOP won three more seats previously occupied by Democrats, expanding its control of the legislature to 23–2. The two Democratic candidates who were elected ran unopposed, and there was only one other Democrat running for any of the 25 seats. Meanwhile, a proposition that sought to expand legislator terms from two years to four years was rejected, with 65.06 percent of 17,701 total votes countywide going against the proposition.

=== District representation (2024) ===
District Number	Municipality	Representative
1	Sandy Creek, Redfield, Boylston	Michael G. Yerdon (R)
2	Orwell, Albion, Williamstown, Richland	Herbert G. Yerdon (R)
3	Pulaski, Richland	Edward Gilson (R)
4	Amboy, Hastings, Parish, Williamstown, West Monroe	David Holst (R)
5	Constantia, Cleveland	Roy Reehil (R)
6	Hastings, West Monroe	John Martino (R)
7	Mexico	Frank Bombardo (R)
8	Palermo, Hastings, Schroeppel	Paul House, Majority Leader (R, C, I)
9	Central Square, Hastings	James Weatherup, Legislature Chair (R, I)
10	Volney, Granby, Schroeppel	Mary Chesbro (R, C)
11	Volney	Linda Lockwood (R)
12	Schroeppel, Hastings	Richard Kline (R, C)
13	New Haven, Scriba	Patrick Twiss, Majority Whip (R)
14	Scriba	Stephen Walpole (R, I)
15	City of Oswego	Kevin Hill (R)
16	City of Oswego	James Scanlon (R)
17	City of Oswego, Scriba	Charles Burger (R)
18	City of Oswego	Robert Wilmott (R, C, I)
19	Minetto, Oswego (Town), Hannibal, Granby	Marie Schadt, Minority Whip (D, C)
20	Oswego Town	Paul Connolly (R)
21	Hannibal	Noelle Salmonson (R)
22	Granby, City of Fulton	James Karasek (R)
23	Granby	Michael Soloway (R)
24	City of Fulton, Granby	Marc Greco, Vice Chair (R, I)
25	City of Fulton	Frank Castiglia, Minority Leader (D)

Oswego County has two representatives in the state assembly, with Republicans William A. Barclay and Brian Manktelow both serving as assemblymen for portions of the county. There are two state senators who represent Oswego County. Mark Walczyk represents the 49th district and Chris Ryan represents the 50th district in the state senate.

== Education ==
School districts include:

- Altmar-Parish-Williamstown Central School District
- Camden Central School District
- Cato-Meridian Central School District
- Central Square Central School District
- Fulton City School District
- Hannibal Central School District
- Mexico Central School District
- Oswego City School District
- Phoenix Central School District
- Pulaski Central School District
- Sandy Creek Central School District
- South Jefferson Central School District

== See also ==
- List of counties in New York
- National Register of Historic Places listings in Oswego County, New York
