= National Register of Historic Places listings in Oswego County, New York =

Location of Oswego County in New York

Oswego County, New York, has 95 properties and districts listed on the National Register of Historic Places. Two properties, the Nash (tugboat) and the New York Barge Canal, are further designated a National Historic Landmark of the United States.

The locations of National Register properties and districts (at least for all showing latitude and longitude coordinates below) may be seen in a map by clicking on "Map of all coordinates".

This National Park Service list is complete through NPS recent listings posted May 1, 2026.

Contents: Counties in New York
Albany (Albany) – Allegany – Bronx – Broome – Cattaraugus – Cayuga – Chautauqua – Chemung – Chenango – Clinton – Columbia – Cortland – Delaware – Dutchess (Poughkeepsie, Rhinebeck) – Erie (Buffalo) – Essex – Franklin – Fulton – Genesee – Greene – Hamilton – Herkimer – Jefferson – Kings – Lewis – Livingston – Madison – Monroe (Rochester) – Montgomery – Nassau – New York (Below 14th Street, 14th to 59th Streets, 59th to 110th Streets, Above 110th Street, Islands) – Niagara (Niagara Falls) – Oneida – Onondaga (Syracuse) – Ontario – Orange – Orleans – Oswego – Otsego – Putnam – Queens – Rensselaer – Richmond – Rockland – St. Lawrence – Saratoga – Schenectady – Schoharie – Schuyler – Seneca – Steuben – Suffolk – Sullivan – Tioga – Tompkins – Ulster – Warren – Washington – Wayne – Westchester (Northern, Southern, New Rochelle, Peekskill, Yonkers) – Wyoming – Yates

== Listings county-wide ==
	Name on the Register	Image	Date listed	Location	City or town	Description
1	Amboy District No. 2 Schoolhouse		December 1, 2020 (#100005849)	398 NY 69; 43°22′11″N 75°54′13″W	East Amboy vicinity	
2	Leonard Ames Farmhouse	Leonard Ames Farmhouse	November 14, 1991 (#91001630)	5707 Main St. 43°27′38″N 76°14′30″W	Mexico	
3	Orson Ames House	Orson Ames House	December 4, 2001 (#01001318)	3339 Main St. 43°27′35″N 76°14′07″W	Mexico	
4	Arthur Tavern	Arthur Tavern	November 14, 1991 (#91001632)	Junction of Clarke Rd. and NY 16; 43°29′42″N 76°14′57″W	Arthur	
5	Smith H. Barlow House		November 15, 1988 (#88002214)	Harwood Dr. 43°38′36″N 76°04′30″W	Lacona	
6	Brosemer Brewery		March 29, 2010 (#10000102)	472 W. First St. 43°26′45″N 76°30′11″W	Oswego	
7	Buckhout-Jones Building	Buckhout-Jones Building	December 4, 2001 (#01001322)	5-13 W. Bridge St. 43°27′24″N 76°30′41″W	Oswego	
8	Carley's Mills Schoolhouse	Carley's Mills Schoolhouse	January 5, 2005 (#04001449)	County Route 84; 43°22′24″N 76°07′02″W	Hastings	
9	CHANCELLOR (tugboat)	CHANCELLOR (tugboat)	February 18, 2000 (#00000050)	Oswego River; 43°19′11″N 76°25′03″W	Fulton	
10	Peter Chandler House	Peter Chandler House	November 14, 1991 (#91001626)	5897 Main St. 43°27′35″N 76°13′45″W	Mexico	
11	Starr Clark Tin Shop	Starr Clark Tin Shop	December 4, 2001 (#01001323)	3250 Main St. 43°27′35″N 76°13′43″W	Mexico	
12	Edwin W. and Charlotte Clarke House		February 26, 2002 (#02000052)	80 E. Mohawk St. 43°27′24″N 76°30′02″W	Oswego	
13	Phineas Davis Farmstead	Phineas Davis Farmstead	June 20, 1991 (#91000524)	5422 North Rd. 43°27′55″N 76°13′37″W	Mexico	
14	Derrick Boat No. 8		January 7, 2015 (#14001129)	1 W. 1st St. 43°27′42″N 76°30′58″W	Oswego	Built in 1927, it is one of the few surviving steam-powered barges to have worked on the New York State Barge Canal
15	John B. and Lydia Edwards House		December 4, 2001 (#01001316)	144 E. Third St. 43°27′17″N 76°30′16″W	Oswego	
16	First Baptist Church	First Baptist Church	November 15, 1988 (#88002218)	Harwood Dr. 43°38′38″N 76°04′40″W	Sandy Creek	
17	First Congregational Church and Society of Volney		June 29, 2001 (#01000675)	NY 3; 43°20′18″N 76°20′19″W	Volney	
18	First National Bank of Lacona	First National Bank of Lacona	November 15, 1988 (#88002219)	Harwood Dr. and Salina St. 43°38′36″N 76°04′10″W	Lacona	
19	Fort Brewerton	Fort Brewerton	March 7, 1973 (#73001247)	State and Lansing Sts. 43°14′32″N 76°08′29″W	Brewerton	
20	Fort Ontario	Fort Ontario	December 18, 1970 (#70000426)	E. 7th St. and Lake Ontario; 43°27′55″N 76°30′31″W	Oswego	
21	Fowler-Loomis House	Fowler-Loomis House	November 14, 1991 (#91001628)	6022 Main St. 43°27′32″N 76°13′16″W	Mexico	
22	Franklin Square Historic District	Franklin Square Historic District	August 4, 1982 (#82003394)	Roughly bounded by 3rd, 6th, Van Buren, and Bridge Sts. 43°27′25″N 76°30′59″W	Oswego	
23	Fulton Public Library		January 15, 1999 (#98001616)	160 S. First St. 43°19′10″N 76°24′59″W	Fulton	
24	Nathan and Clarissa Green House		February 26, 2002 (#02000054)	98 West Eighth St. 43°27′22″N 76°31′13″W	Oswego	
25	Hamilton Farmstead	Hamilton Farmstead	November 18, 1991 (#91001657)	5644 Hamilton St. 43°28′30″N 76°13′52″W	Mexico	
26	Holyoke Cottage		November 15, 1988 (#88002216)	Seber Shore Rd. 43°38′45″N 76°09′56″W	Sandy Creek	
27	Hunter-Oliphant Block		July 21, 1995 (#95000880)	215-219 W. First St. 43°27′20″N 76°30′39″W	Oswego	
28	Kingsford Historic District	Kingsford Historic District	January 22, 2014 (#13001114)	Roughly W. Bridge, W. Mohawk, W. Oneida, W. 4th, and W. 5th Sts. 43°27′12″N 76°30′48″W	Oswego	
29	Kingsford House		August 21, 1997 (#97000951)	150 W. Third St. 43°27′16″N 76°30′47″W	Oswego	
30	Lacona Clock Tower	Lacona Clock Tower	November 15, 1988 (#88002220)	Harwood Dr. 43°38′36″N 76°04′12″W	Lacona	
31	Lacona Railroad Station and Depot	Lacona Railroad Station and Depot	January 24, 2002 (#01001499)	11 Park Ave. 43°38′34″N 76°04′13″W	Lacona	
32	Hamilton and Rhoda Littlefield House		February 26, 2002 (#02000051)	44 E. Oneida St. 43°27′25″N 76°30′16″W	Oswego	
33	Market House	Market House	June 20, 1974 (#74001292)	Water St. 43°27′26″N 76°30′39″W	Oswego	
34	John and Harriet McKenzie House		December 4, 2001 (#01001314)	96 W. Eighth St. 43°27′23″N 76°31′13″W	Oswego	
35	Methodist Church		November 15, 1988 (#88002213)	Harwood Dr. 43°38′37″N 76°04′58″W	Sandy Creek	
36	Mexico Academy and Central School	Mexico Academy and Central School	November 14, 1991 (#91001633)	3338 Main St. 43°27′37″N 76°14′06″W	Mexico	
37	Mexico Octagon Barn		June 20, 1991 (#91000527)	5276 Ames St. 43°27′08″N 76°14′31″W	Mexico	
38	Mexico Railroad Depot	Mexico Railroad Depot	June 20, 1991 (#91000523)	5530 Scenic Ave. 43°28′09″N 76°13′57″W	Mexico	
39	The Mexico Stone Store	The Mexico Stone Store	March 23, 2010 (#10000103)	3201 Main St. 43°27′35″N 76°13′33″W	Mexico	
40	Mexico Village Historic District	Mexico Village Historic District	June 20, 1991 (#91000528)	Main, Jefferson, Church, and Spring Sts. 43°27′29″N 76°13′46″W	Mexico	
41	Montcalm Park Historic District	Montcalm Park Historic District	May 25, 2001 (#01000555)	Roughly Montcalm St., W. 6th St., W. Schuyler St., and Bronson St. 43°27′35″N 76°31′11″W	Oswego	
42	Mount Adnah Cemetery		February 2, 2001 (#01000046)	706 East Broadway; 43°19′14″N 76°24′12″W	Fulton	
43	NASH (harbor tug)	NASH (harbor tug)	December 4, 1991 (#91002059)	H. Lee White Marine Museum, West 1st Street Pier; 43°27′52″N 76°30′58″W	Oswego	Last surviving Army ship which served at D-Day
44	New York State Barge Canal	New York State Barge Canal	October 15, 2014 (#14000860)	Linear across county 43°19′26″N 76°25′08″W	Cleveland, Constantia, Fulton, Granby, Hastings, Minetta, Phoenix, Schroeppel, Scriba, Volney, West Phoenix	Successor to Erie Canal approved by state voters in early 20th century to compete with railroads.
45	Northrup-Gilbert House	Northrup-Gilbert House	February 4, 2000 (#00000049)	25 Church St. 43°13′43″N 76°17′49″W	Phoenix	
46	Oak Street School		July 3, 2003 (#03000243)	205 Oak St. 43°18′43″N 76°25′07″W	Fulton	
47	Oswego Armory	Oswego Armory	May 19, 1988 (#88000610)	265 W. First St. 43°27′14″N 76°30′35″W	Oswego	
48	Oswego City Hall	Oswego City Hall	February 20, 1973 (#73001248)	W. Oneida St. 43°27′19″N 76°30′42″W	Oswego	
49	Oswego City Library	Oswego City Library	September 22, 1971 (#71000554)	120 E. 2nd St. 43°27′24″N 76°30′25″W	Oswego	
50	Oswego County Courthouse	Oswego County Courthouse	December 7, 2000 (#00001418)	East Bridge St. 43°27′26″N 76°30′22″W	Oswego	
51	Oswego and Syracuse Railroad Freight House	Oswego and Syracuse Railroad Freight House	November 9, 2017 (#100001806)	20-24 W. Utica St. 43°27′09″N 76°30′36″W	Oswego	1848 stone structure is second oldest surviving rail-related building in the state
52	Oswego Theater	Oswego Theater	September 19, 1988 (#88001590)	138 W. Second St. 43°27′21″N 76°30′46″W	Oswego	
53	Oswego West Pierhead Lighthouse	Oswego West Pierhead Lighthouse	December 1, 2000 (#00001468)	Lake Ontario, 0.5 miles (0.80 km) north of the Oswego River; 43°28′24″N 76°31′02″W	Oswego	
54	Oswego Yacht Club	Oswego Yacht Club	March 23, 2010 (#10000105)	41 Lake St. 43°27′44″N 76°31′16″W	Oswego	
55	Daniel and Miriam Pease House		February 26, 2002 (#02000053)	361 Cemetery Rd. 43°25′33″N 76°33′37″W	Oswego	
56	Newton M. Pitt House		November 15, 1988 (#88002209)	8114 Harwood Dr. 43°38′37″N 76°05′00″W	Sandy Creek	
57	Pleasant Lawn Cemetery		October 5, 2005 (#05001125)	NY 69A; 43°24′08″N 76°08′31″W	Parish	
58	Pontiac Hotel	Pontiac Hotel	July 21, 1983 (#83001758)	W. 1st St. 43°26′14″N 76°30′37″W	Oswego	
59	John Wells Pratt House		December 10, 1999 (#99001490)	177 S. 1st St. 43°19′06″N 76°24′53″W	Fulton	
60	Pulaski Village Historic District	Pulaski Village Historic District	September 8, 1983 (#83004525)	Jefferson, Broad, Bridge, Hubbel and Lake Sts. 43°34′01″N 76°07′43″W	Pulaski	
61	Red Mill Farm	Red Mill Farm	November 14, 1991 (#91001629)	7177 Red Mill Rd. 43°25′28″N 76°08′45″W	Colosse	
62	Richardson-Bates House	Richardson-Bates House	September 5, 1975 (#75001220)	135 E. 3rd St. 43°27′21″N 76°30′16″W	Oswego	
63	Riverside Cemetery		August 19, 1993 (#93000854)	E. River Rd. south of the junction with NY 57; 43°25′24″N 76°28′34″W	Oswego	
64	Samuel Sadler House		November 15, 1988 (#88002212)	N. Main St. 43°38′55″N 76°05′07″W	Sandy Creek	
65	St. James' Church		August 30, 1996 (#96000958)	North St., junction with Bridge St. 43°14′02″N 75°52′56″W	Cleveland	
66	St. John's Episcopal Church	St. John's Episcopal Church	May 27, 1993 (#93000442)	670 Main St. 43°13′53″N 76°18′04″W	Phoenix	
67	Charles M. Salisbury House		November 15, 1988 (#88002217)	9089 Church St. 43°38′29″N 76°04′06″W	Lacona	
68	Sandy Creek Historic District		November 15, 1988 (#88002208)	Junction of Lake Rd. and US 11; 43°38′39″N 76°05′10″W	Sandy Creek	
69	Schroeppel House	Schroeppel House	September 9, 1982 (#82003395)	Morgan Rd. 43°12′20″N 76°13′08″W	Schroeppel	
70	Selkirk Lighthouse	Selkirk Lighthouse	March 30, 1979 (#79001618)	West of Pulaski on Lake Rd. 43°34′28″N 76°12′07″W	Pulaski	
71	Sheldon Hall	Sheldon Hall	May 13, 1980 (#80002741)	Washington Blvd. 43°27′16″N 76°32′12″W	Oswego	
72	Matthew Shoecraft House		November 15, 1988 (#88002210)	Ridge Rd. at Smartville Rd. 43°38′33″N 76°03′45″W	Lacona	
73	Timothy Skinner House	Timothy Skinner House	June 20, 1991 (#91000526)	5355 Scenic Ave. 43°27′40″N 76°13′57″W	Mexico	
74	Slack Farmstead		November 14, 1991 (#91001627)	5174 Row Rd. 43°27′07″N 76°11′07″W	Mexico	
75	George B. Sloan Estate	George B. Sloan Estate	August 11, 1988 (#88001237)	107 W. Van Buren St. 43°27′35″N 76°31′17″W	Oswego	
76	Fred Smart House	Fred Smart House	November 15, 1988 (#88002215)	Salina St. 43°38′35″N 76°04′08″W	Lacona	
77	Standard Yarn Company Building		May 15, 2008 (#08000410)	317 W. 1st St. 43°27′08″N 76°30′30″W	Oswego	
78	State Street Methodist Episcopal Church	State Street Methodist Episcopal Church	February 20, 2013 (#13000030)	357 State St. 43°19′06″N 76°24′35″W	Fulton	1894 Romanesque Revival church represents city's prosperity at that time
79	Stillman Farmstead	Stillman Farmstead	June 20, 1991 (#91000525)	NY 104 between Co. Rt. 58 and US 11; 43°27′33″N 76°09′47″W	Mexico	
80	Stillwater Bridge	Stillwater Bridge	November 7, 1997 (#97001385)	Dam Rd. over Salmon R. 43°32′41″N 75°55′20″W	Stillwater	
81	Sweet Memorial Building	Sweet Memorial Building	April 26, 1990 (#90000695)	821 Main St. 43°13′45″N 76°17′58″W	Phoenix	
82	Tanner Block	Tanner Block	December 25, 2009 (#09001269)	175-177 W. First St. 43°27′25″N 76°30′41″W	Oswego	
83	Thayer Farmstead	Thayer Farmstead	November 14, 1991 (#91001631)	5933 Church St. 43°27′11″N 76°13′35″W	Mexico	
84	Trinity Church	Trinity Church	October 29, 1982 (#82001231)	NY 49; 43°14′52″N 76°00′29″W	Constantia	
85	Newman Tuttle House		November 15, 1988 (#88002211)	Harwood Dr. at Ridge Rd. 43°38′37″N 76°03′51″W	Lacona	
86	U.S. Customhouse		November 21, 1976 (#76001262)	W. Oneida St. between 1st and 2nd Sts. 43°27′17″N 76°30′40″W	Oswego	
87	US Post Office-Fulton	US Post Office-Fulton	May 11, 1989 (#88002519)	214 S. First St. 43°19′03″N 76°24′53″W	Fulton	
88	David Van Buren House		June 9, 1988 (#88000726)	Van Buren Dr., W end at the Oswego River; 43°21′37″N 76°25′45″W	Fulton	
89	John Van Buren Tavern		November 3, 1988 (#88002377)	NY 57 and Van Buren Dr. 43°21′35″N 76°25′45″W	Fulton	
90	Volkert Van Buren House		October 7, 1988 (#88001707)	NY 57 and Distin Rd. 43°22′01″N 76°25′34″W	Fulton	
91	Walton and Willett Stone Store	Walton and Willett Stone Store	May 24, 1976 (#76001263)	1 Seneca St. 43°27′35″N 76°30′43″W	Oswego	
92	Washington Square Historic District		December 25, 2009 (#09001270)	E. 4th St., E. Oneida St., E. 3rd St. 43°27′26″N 76°30′16″W	Oswego	
93	West Broadway Commercial Historic District		December 1, 2020 (#100005848)	109-126 West Broadway; 43°18′57″N 76°25′08″W	Fulton	
94	Asa and Caroline Wing House	Asa and Caroline Wing House	December 4, 2001 (#01001317)	3392 NY 69; 43°25′15″N 76°09′52″W	Mexico	
95	Woodruff Block		April 20, 1995 (#95000473)	17 W. Cayuga St. 43°27′28″N 76°30′46″W	Oswego	

== See also ==
- National Register of Historic Places listings in New York
