= Washington Square =

Washington Square may refer to:

== Places ==
=== Thailand ===
- Washington Square (Bangkok), Thailand

=== United States ===
==== California ====
- Washington Square, Pasadena, California, a neighborhood
- Washington Square (San Diego)
- Washington Square (San Francisco)
- Washington Square, San Jose, the campus of San Jose State University

==== Elsewhere ====
- Washington Square, Savannah, Georgia
- Washington Square Park (Chicago), Illinois
- Washington Square, New Orleans, Louisiana, in the Faubourg Marigny
- Washington Square (Brookline), Massachusetts
  - Washington Square (MBTA station), Brookline
- Washington Square Park, Greenwich Village, New York City, New York
- Washington Square, Syracuse, New York
- Washington Square West, Philadelphia, neighborhood
  - Washington Square (Philadelphia), Pennsylvania, park
- Washington Square (Newport, Rhode Island)
- Washington Square (Charleston), South Carolina
- Washington Square (Salt Lake City), Utah

== Buildings ==
- Washington Square (Detroit), Michigan
- Washington Square Village, New York City
- Washington Square (Bellevue, Washington)

== Shopping centers ==
- Washington Square (Oregon), Tigard, Oregon
- Washington Square Mall (Evansville, Indiana)
- Washington Square Mall (Indianapolis, Indiana)

== Arts and entertainment ==
=== Music ===
- "Washington Square" (composition), a 1963 instrumental by the Village Stompers
- "Washington Square", a 2008 song by Counting Crows from Saturday Nights & Sunday Mornings
- Washington Squares, an American folk pop group 1983–1991

=== Other media ===
- Washington Square (novel), an 1880 novel by Henry James
  - Washington Square (film), a 1997 adaptation directed by Agnieszka Holland
- Washington Square (TV series), a 1956–1957 American musical comedy series
- Washington Square News, the student newspaper of New York University
- Washington Square Films (WSF), an American production and management company

== See also ==
- Washington Square Historic District (disambiguation)
- Washington Square Park (disambiguation)
