= George Sloan =

George Sloan may refer to:

- George B. Sloan (1831–1904), American businessman, banker, and politician
- George Sloan (Canadian politician) (fl. 1930–1959), member of the Ottawa City Council
- Off-Ramp, a DC Comics character

== See also ==
- George B. Sloan Estate, Oswego, New York
