= Lacona station =

Lacona station may refer to:

- Lacona station (New York), a historic railroad station in New York
- Laconia Passenger Station, a historic railroad station in New Hampshire
