= Sheldon Hall =

Sheldon Hall may refer to:

- Sheldon Hall, Birmingham, an early 16th-century manor house in the Tile Cross area of Birmingham, England
- Sheldon Hall (Oswego, New York), a collegiate building on the campus of the State University of New York at Oswego
- Sheldon Hall (film historian)

== See also ==
- Sheldon-Hall syndrome, a form of arthrogryposis
