= Washington Square Historic District (Oswego, New York) =

Historic district in New York, United States

- U.S. National Register of Historic Places
- U.S. Historic district
- Location within New York Location within the United States
- Location: E. 4th St., E. Oneida St., E. 3rd St., Oswego, New York
- Coordinates: 43°27′25.62″N 76°30′15.78″W
- Area: 16.94 acres (6.86 ha)
- Built: 1797
- NRHP reference No.: 09001270
- Added to NRHP: December 25, 2009

Washington Square Historic District is a national historic district located at Oswego in Oswego County, New York. It includes 39 contributing buildings, one contributing structure, and one contributing site. It encompasses the historic civic and religious center on the east side of the city. There are 37 residences, four churches, a synagogue, a public green, the county office building, and County Courthouse, and a former railroad tunnel. Located within the district are the separately listed Hamilton and Rhoda Littlefield House, Richardson-Bates House, Oswego City Library, and Oswego County Courthouse. Washington Park was laid out in 1797 when the city of Oswego was laid out.

It was listed on the National Register of Historic Places in 2009.
