= Washington Square Park (disambiguation) =

Washington Square Park is a park in New York City.

Washington Square Park may also refer to:

== Places ==
- Washington Square Park (Chicago)
- Washington Square Park (Philadelphia)
- Washington Square Park (Rochester, New York)
- Washington Square Park (San Francisco)
- Washington Square Park (Salt Lake City)
- Washington Square Park, the location of San Jose State University

== Arts, entertainment and media ==
=== Music ===
- "Washington Square Park", a 1997 song by The Get Up Kids from Four Minute Mile
- "Washington Square Park", a 2010 song by The Wonder Years from The Upsides

== See also ==
- Washington Square (disambiguation)
- Washington Park (disambiguation)
- Washington Square Historic District (disambiguation)
