= Arthur Tavern =

Historic commercial building in New York, United States

- U.S. National Register of Historic Places
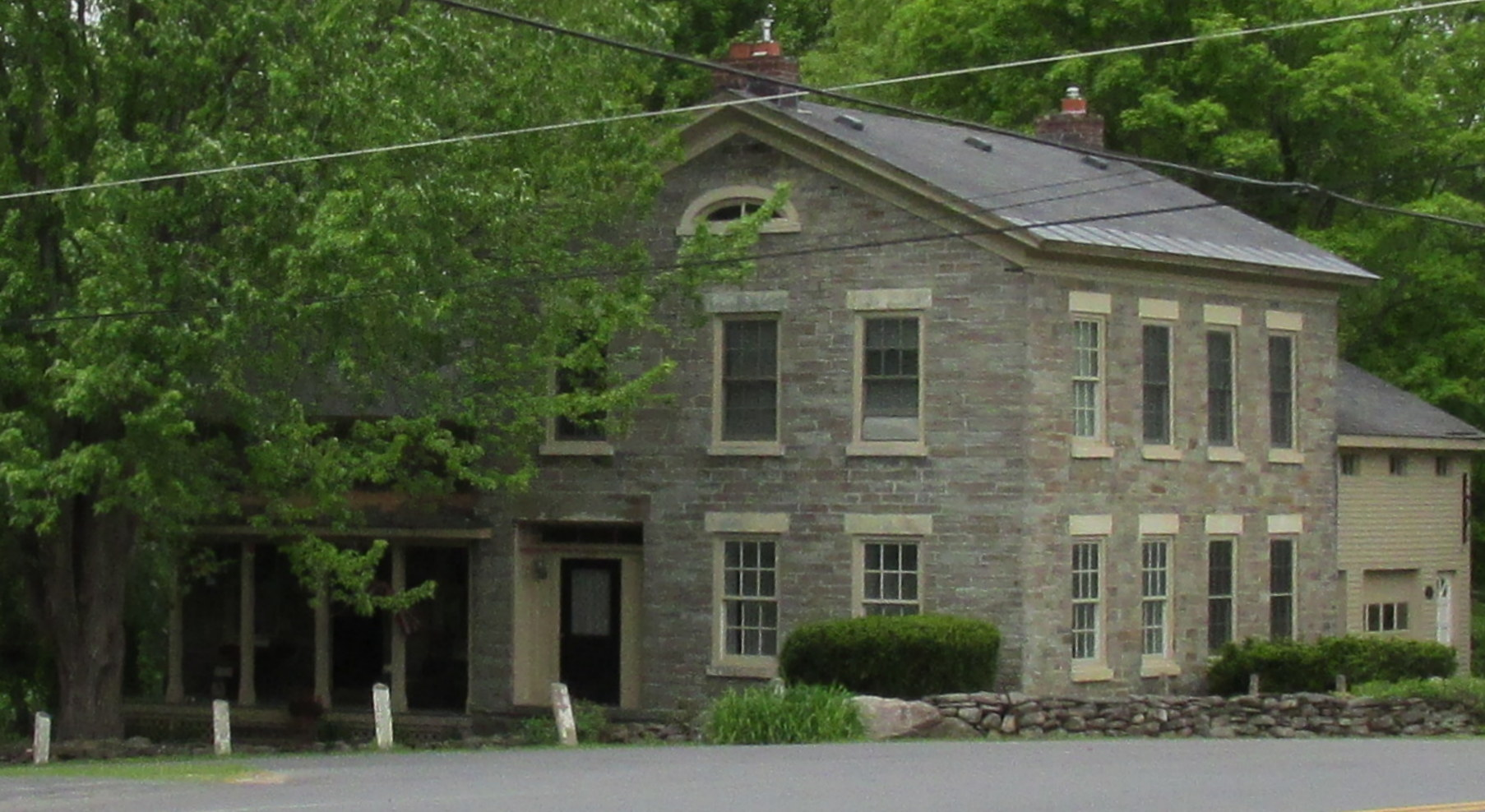

- Location within New York Location within the United States
- Location: Jct. of Clarke Rd. and NY 16, Arthur, New York
- Coordinates: 43°29′42″N 76°14′57″W
- Area: 3.5 acres (1.4 ha)
- Built: ca. 1838
- Architectural style: Federal
- MPS: Mexico MPS
- NRHP reference No.: 91001632
- Added to NRHP: November 14, 1991

Arthur Tavern is a historic inn and tavern building located at Arthur in Oswego County, New York. It consists of a 2-story main block, three bays wide and four bays deep, with a 1 1/2-story wing. It is constructed of grey sandstone and built around 1838.

It was listed on the National Register of Historic Places on November 14, 1991.
