= Kingsford Historic District =

Historic district in New York, United States

- U.S. National Register of Historic Places
- U.S. Historic district
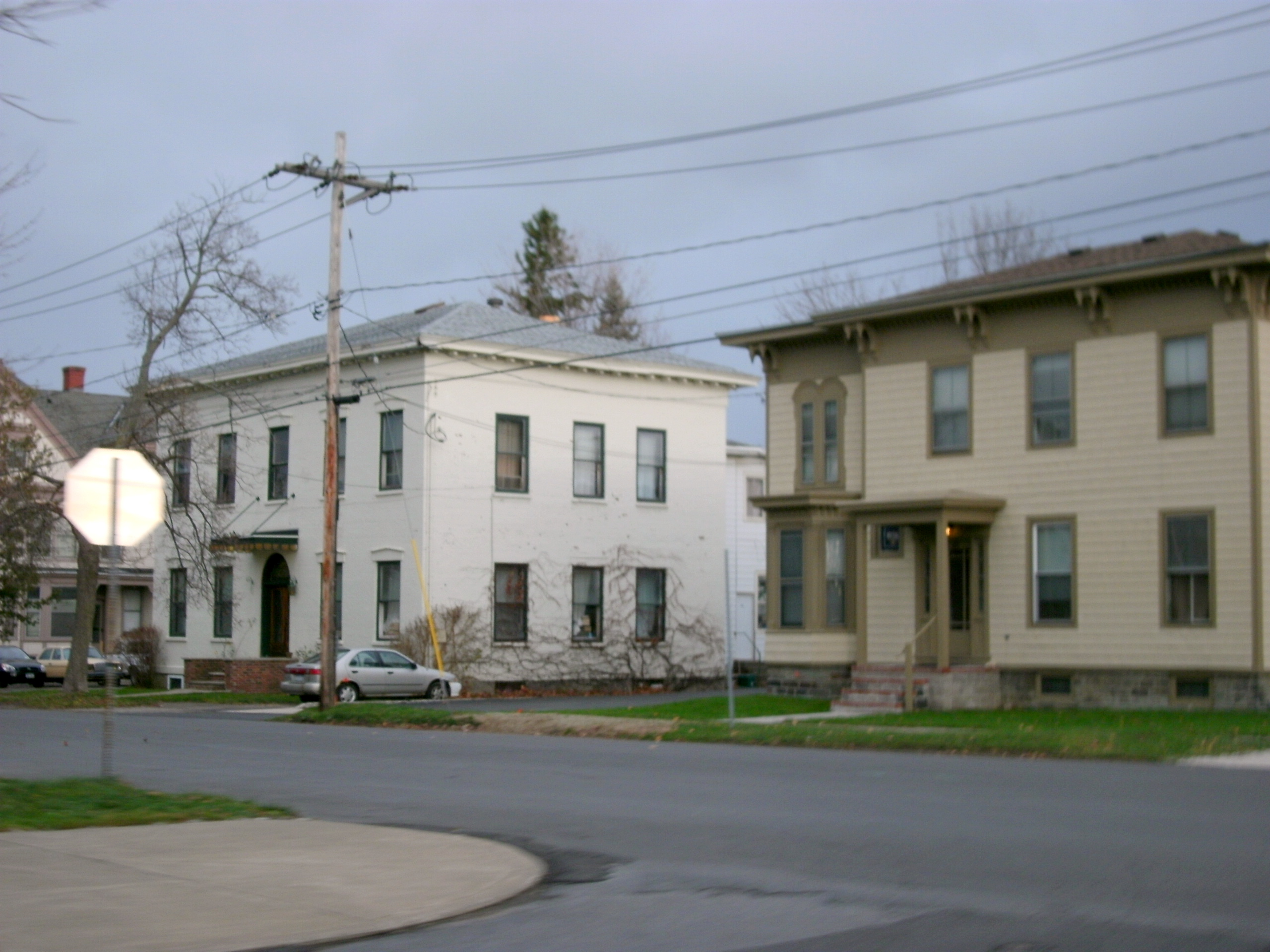
- Kingsford Historic District, November 2010

- Location within New York Location within the United States
- Location: Roughly W. Bridge, W. Mohawk, W. Oneida, W. 4th & W. 5th Sts., Oswego, New York
- Coordinates: 43°27′12″N 76°30′48″W
- Area: 21.61 acres (8.75 ha)
- Built: c. 1830-1910
- Architect: Bragdon, Claude; Warner, Andrew Jackson; Hopkins, A.J.; Seeber, John H.
- Architectural style: Italianate, Romanesque, Colonial Revival, Tudor Revival
- NRHP reference No.: 13001114
- Added to NRHP: January 22, 2014

Kingsford Historic District is a national historic district located at Oswego, Oswego County, New York. It encompasses 76 contributing buildings in a predominantly residential section of Oswego. It developed between about 1830 and 1910, and includes notable examples of Italianate, Romanesque Revival, Colonial Revival, and Tudor Revival style architecture. Located in the district is the separately listed Kingsford House. Other notable buildings include the former St. Matthew's Lutheran Church (1888), 40 West Oneida Street (1898) designed by Claude Fayette Bragdon, the former Public School #3 (1860s), and West Baptist Church (1867) designed by Andrew Jackson Warner.

It was added to the National Register of Historic Places in 2014.
