= Lacona Clock Tower =

- U.S. National Register of Historic Places
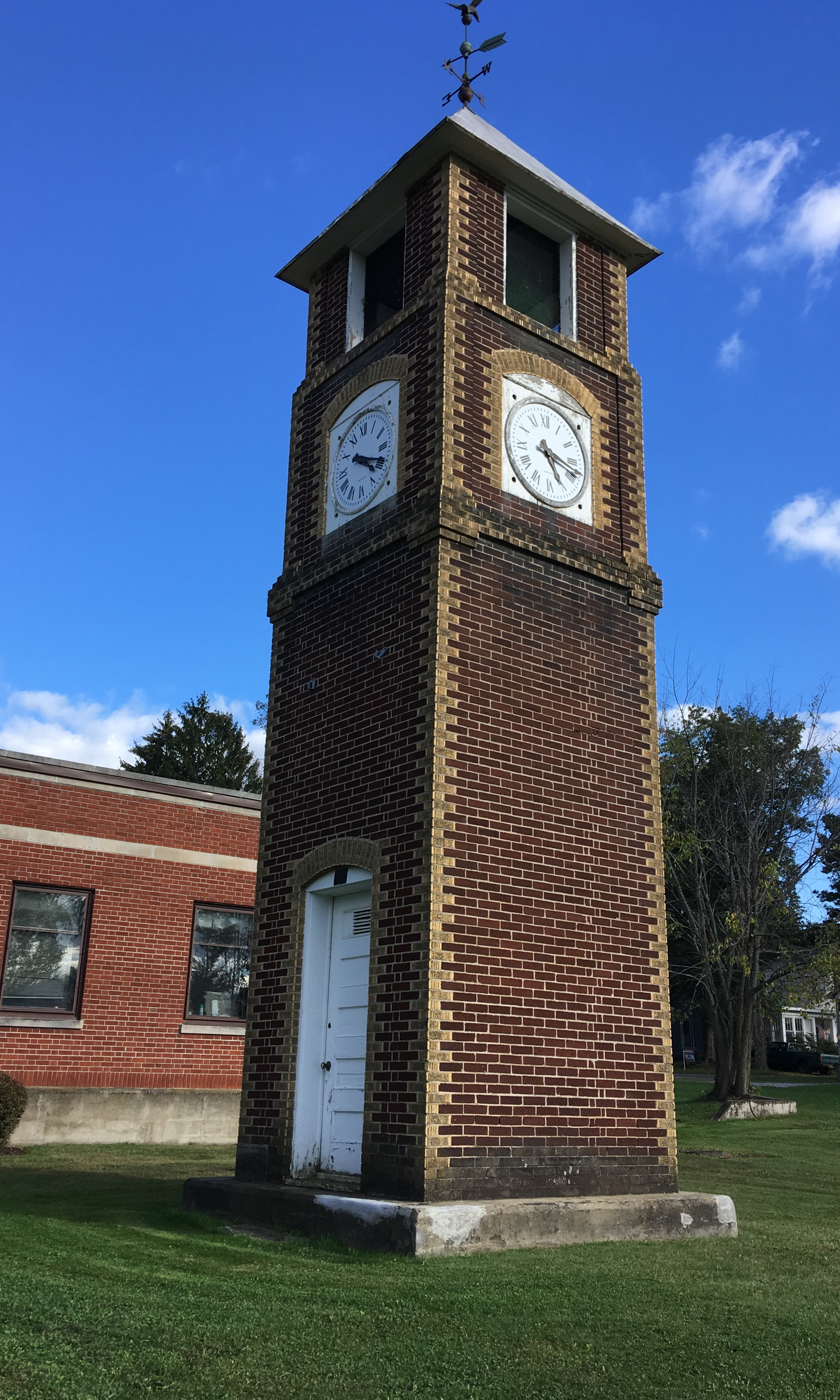
- The Lacona Clock Tower with the side of the First National Bank of Lacona in the background.

- Location within New York Location within the United States
- Location: Harwood Dr., Lacona, New York
- Coordinates: 43°38′36″N 76°4′12″W
- Area: 0.1 acres (0.040 ha)
- Built: 1925
- MPS: Sandy Creek MRA
- NRHP reference No.: 88002220
- Added to NRHP: November 15, 1988

Lacona Clock Tower is a historic clock tower located at Lacona in Oswego County, New York. It was built in 1925 and is a freestanding three-tier red brick tower with a square plan and pyramidal roof. The second stage features the working electric clock and third stage a belfry containing the village bell.

It was listed on the National Register of Historic Places in 1988.
