= Washington Square Historic District =

Washington Square Historic District may refer to:

- Washington Square Historic District (Chicago), in Chicago, Illinois, US, listed on the National Register of Historic Places
- Washington Square Historic District (Holland, Michigan), listed on the National Register of Historic Places
- Washington Square Historic District (Oswego, New York), listed on the National Register of Historic Places listings in Oswego County, New York
- Washington Square West Historic District, in Philadelphia, Pennsylvania, US, listed on the National Register of Historic Places
- Washington Square Historic District (Nacogdoches, Texas), in Nacogdoches County, Texas, US, listed on the National Register of Historic Places
