= Red Mill Farm =

- U.S. National Register of Historic Places
- U.S. Historic district
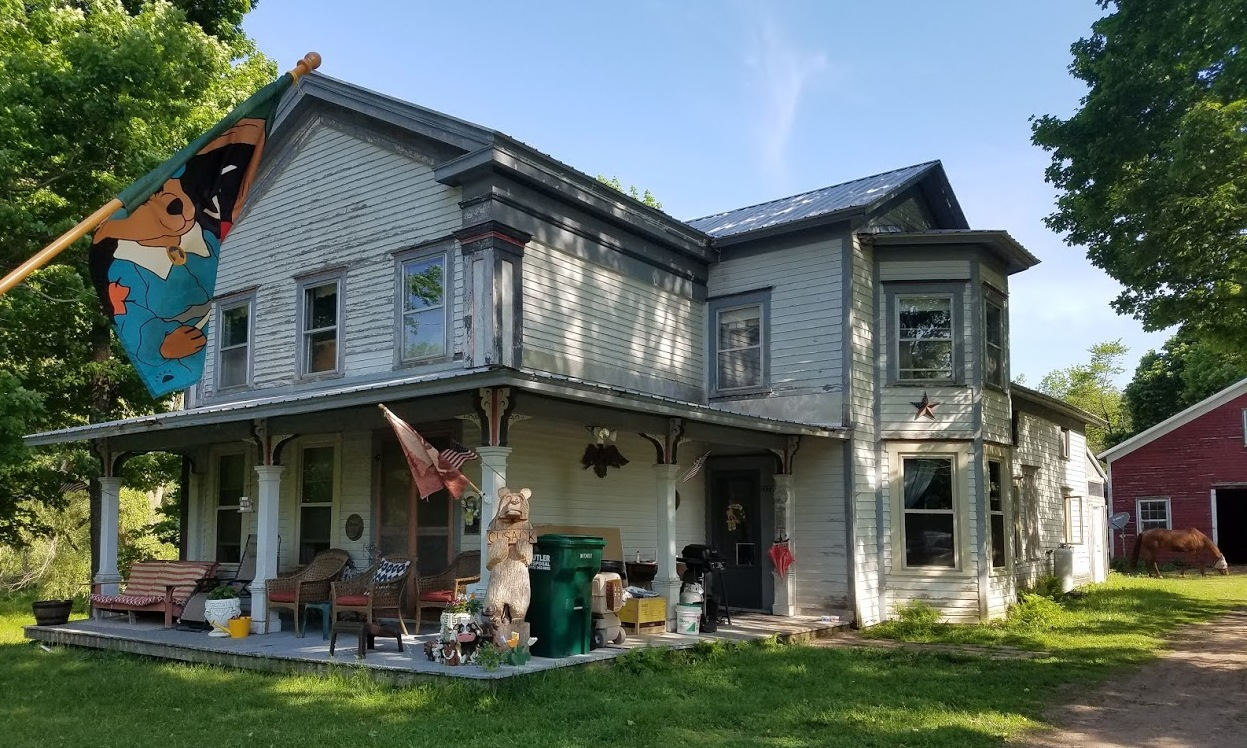
- Farmhouse (1832)

- Location within New York Location within the United States
- Nearest city: Colosse, New York
- Coordinates: 43°25′28″N 76°8′45″W
- Area: 174.8 acres (70.7 ha)
- Built: 1832
- Architectural style: Early Republic, Italianate
- MPS: Mexico MPS
- NRHP reference No.: 91001629
- Added to NRHP: November 14, 1991

Red Mill Farm is a historic farm complex and national historic district located at Colosse in Oswego County, New York. The district includes a number of contributing structures; the farmhouse, tool shop (c. 1832), granary (c. 1832), horse barn (c. 1832), silo, garage, milkhouse, and windmill. The farmhouse was built about 1832 and is a three bay, two story frame building.

It was listed on the National Register of Historic Places in 1991.
