= Eugenie Maria Morenus =

American mathematician (1881–1966)

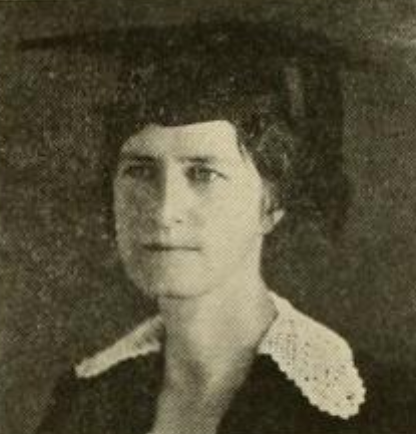
- Eugenie Maria Morenus from a 1921 yearbook
- Born: February 21, 1881; Cleveland, New York
- Died: October 15, 1966 (aged 85); Lake Wales, Florida
- Education: Vassar College; Columbia University
- Occupations: Mathematician, college professor
- Known for: Charter member of the Mathematical Association of America

Eugenie Maria Morenus (February 21, 1881 – October 15, 1966) was an American mathematician and college professor and one of the few women to earn a PhD in math before World War II. She taught Latin and mathematics at Sweet Briar College from 1909 to 1946.

== Early life and education ==
Morenus was born in Cleveland, New York, the daughter of Eugene Morenus and Maria Euphemia Van Blarcom Morenus. Her father managed a glassworks. She graduated from Monogahela High School in 1898. She earned a bachelor's degree from Vassar College in 1904, and a master's degree from the same school in 1905. She completed doctoral studies in mathematics at Columbia University in 1922. Her dissertation under Edward Kasner was titled "Geometric properties completely characterizing the set of all the curves of constant pressure in a field of force".

Morenus was also a student for briefer periods at the University of Chicago, and at Göttingen.

== Career ==
Morenus taught mathematics and Latin at a school in Watertown, New York and at Poughkeepsie High School after her master's degree. She was a Latin instructor at Sweet Briar College from 1909 to 1916, and was a mathematics professor at the same school from 1916 to 1946. She was head of the mathematics department for much of that time. While at the school she was prominent in campus events, as a chorister, photographer, and play director. Her horse, October or "Toby", was a familiar figure on campus, and Morenus would lead ten-day rides for students over spring breaks.

Morenus was a charter member of the Mathematical Association of America, belonged to the Virginia Academy of Science, and was active in the American Association of University Women (AAUW). She was active in the Order of the Eastern Star and the Daughters of the American Revolution. She received an Anna Brackett Fellowship by the AAUW in 1927, to study at Cambridge. After her retirement from Sweet Briar College in 1946, she taught briefly at Connecticut College for Women, and spent her winters in Florida.

== Personal life ==
Morenus died in Lake Wales, Florida in 1966, aged 85 years. There was a scholarship endowment fund named for Morenus at Sweet Briar College, beginning in 1960.
