= Lacona, New York =

- Village
- Location in Oswego County and the state of New York.
- Coordinates: 43°38′38″N 76°4′7″W
- Country: United States
- State: New York
- County: Oswego

Area
  - Total: 1.12 sq mi (2.89 km^{2})
  - Land: 1.11 sq mi (2.88 km^{2})
  - Water: 0.0039 sq mi (0.01 km^{2})
- Elevation: 560 ft (170 m)

Population (2020)
  - Total: 657
  - Density: 590.6/sq mi (228.05/km^{2})
- Time zone: UTC-5 (Eastern (EST))
  - Summer (DST): UTC-4 (EDT)
- ZIP code: 13083
- Area code: 315
- FIPS code: 36-40200
- GNIS feature ID: 0954867

Lacona is a village in Oswego County, New York, United States. As of the 2020 census, Lacona had a population of 657. The village is inside the town of Sandy Creek, halfway between Syracuse and Watertown.

== History ==
The village was founded around 1803. Lacona was incorporated as a village in 1880.

The Smith H. Barlow House, First National Bank of Lacona, Lacona Clock Tower, Lacona Railroad Station and Depot, Charles M. Salisbury House, Matthew Shoecraft House, Fred Smart House, and Newman Tuttle House are listed on the National Register of Historic Places.

== Geography ==
Lacona is located at 43°38′38″N 76°4′7″W (43.643791, -76.068562).

According to the United States Census Bureau, the village has a total area of 1.0 square mile (2.6 km^{2}), all land.

The village is east of Interstate 81. Little Sandy Creek flows westward through the village and the adjacent village of Sandy Creek.

== Demographics ==
Historical population
Census	Pop.	Note	%±
1880	378		—
1890	333		−11.9%
1900	388		16.5%
1910	443		14.2%
1920	461		4.1%
1930	546		18.4%
1940	413		−24.4%
1950	540		30.8%
1960	556		3.0%
1970	556		0.0%
1980	582		4.7%
1990	593		1.9%
2000	590		−0.5%
2010	582		−1.4%
2020	657		12.9%
U.S. Decennial Census

As of the census of 2000, there were 590 people, 243 households, and 156 families residing in the village. The population density was 576.7 inhabitants per square mile (222.7/km^{2}). There were 271 housing units at an average density of 264.9 per square mile (102.3/km^{2}). The racial makeup of the village was 98.64% White, 0.17% African American, 0.34% Asian, and 0.85% from two or more races. Hispanic or Latino of any race were 1.19% of the population.

There were 243 households, out of which 34.6% had children under the age of 18 living with them, 42.8% were married couples living together, 15.6% had a female householder with no husband present, and 35.8% were non-families. 27.2% of all households were made up of individuals, and 11.5% had someone living alone who was 65 years of age or older. The average household size was 2.43 and the average family size was 2.97.

In the village, the population was spread out, with 29.0% under the age of 18, 6.4% from 18 to 24, 30.7% from 25 to 44, 23.4% from 45 to 64, and 10.5% who were 65 years of age or older. The median age was 36 years. For every 100 females, there were 91.6 males. For every 100 females age 18 and over, there were 85.4 males.

The median income for a household in the village was $32,222, and the median income for a family was $41,111. Males had a median income of $37,500 versus $27,955 for females. The per capita income for the village was $16,418. About 19.3% of families and 24.6% of the population were below the poverty line, including 35.9% of those under age 18 and 18.2% of those age 65 or over.
