= Grandma Brown's Baked Beans =

Canned baked beans

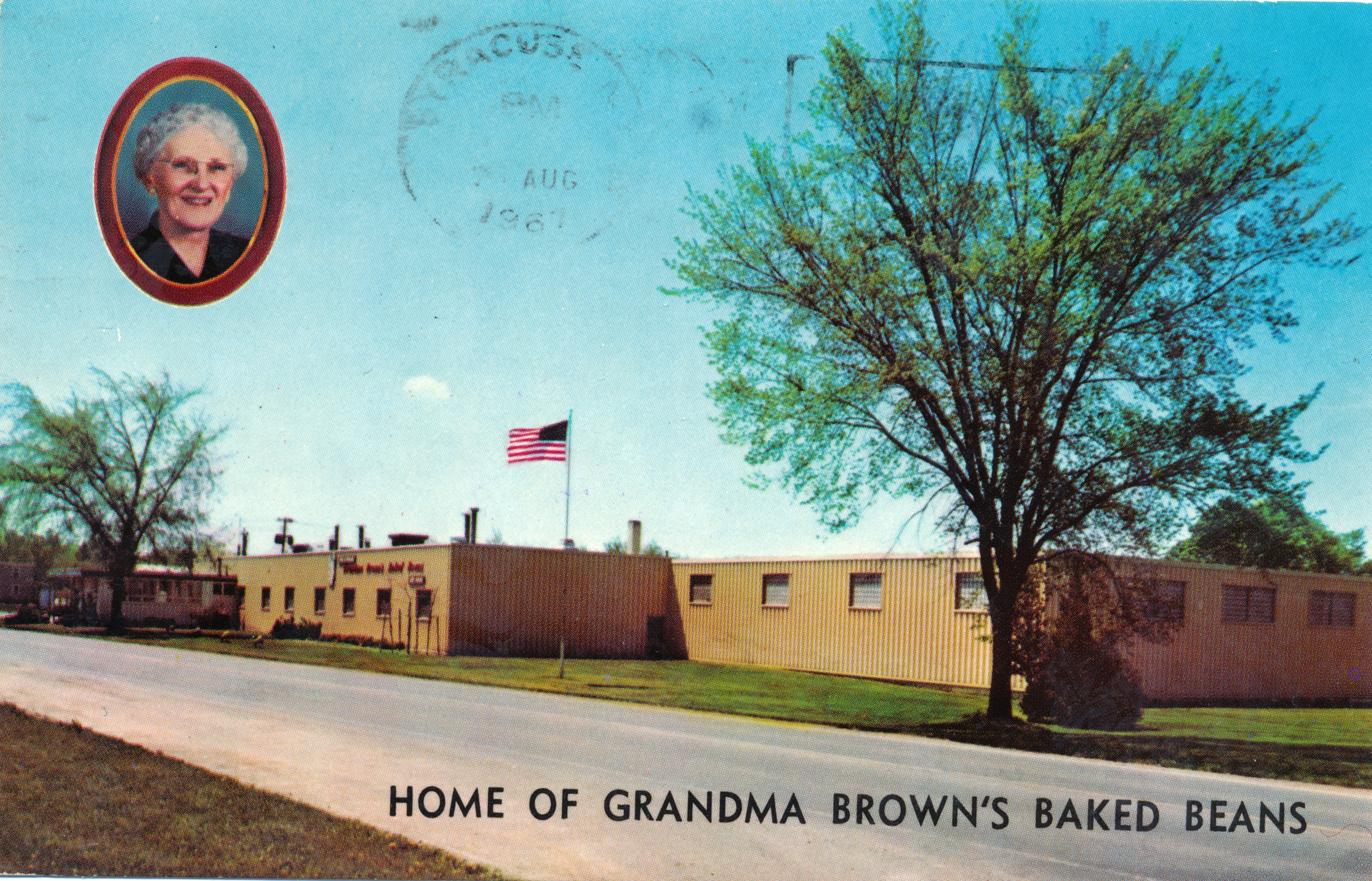
- c. 1967 postcard featuring the company's factory
- Industry: Food processing
- Founded: 1930s
- Founder: Lulu J. Brown
- Headquarters: Mexico, New York
- Area served: Northeastern United States
- Products: Baked beans

Grandma Brown's Baked Beans is a Central New York brand of baked beans founded by Lulu Brown in the 1930s. (Note: Sources variously report that the company was founded in 1935, 1937, or 1938.) The beans (and at one time soup) were sold throughout New York, Connecticut, Massachusetts, Vermont, New Hampshire and Pennsylvania until 2021.

== History ==
The company founder, Lulu J. Brown (1875–1950), had previously operated a small department store with her husband, Earl, in Mexico, New York, north of Syracuse. After the shop failed during the Great Depression, she began selling her baked beans from open pans at a local grocery store to help bring in extra money. The product proved popular and the Browns quickly installed four more oil-burning stoves in their kitchen to meet demand. Within six months, they outgrew the small home kitchen and expanded into a commercial space, and their territory spread to include Oswego.

After her husband died on 24 December 1938, Brown continued to operate the business with her son, Robert, and a new partner, Earl's friend Richard Whitney, and the company became known as Brown Whitney Brown (BWB). In 1941, they transitioned to canning their product, with assistance from the Continental Can Company, but resumed open pan sales during World War II, as metal was required for the war effort. In 1950, Brown died at the age of 75.

The company continued to operate out of a baked bean-colored factory in Mexico, New York, until 2021, when it temporarily ceased production. In 2022, owner Sandra Brown (Lulu Brown's granddaughter), hoped to restart operations, but had been unsuccessful in recruiting a new workforce.
