= Ned Sherman =

American mayor (1807–1907)

Edward Sherman (June 9, 1807 – 1907) was the first African American to serve as a mayor in New York State and one of the first African Americans to hold an elected office in the state. He served as president of the village board of Cleveland, New York, in 1878.

== Biography ==
Sherman was born on June 9, 1807, in Saratoga, New York. He moved to Herkimer, New York, at the age of 21, and eventually settled permanently in Cleveland in 1851. As a younger man, he drove an Erie Canal packet boat, and in Cleveland he worked as a barber.

At a Cleveland village board meeting on April 29, 1878, board president Albert A. Yale nominated a Catholic for the office of cemetery sexton. Yale had underestimated his community's anti-Catholic and anti-immigrant attitudes. Villagers were outraged, and Yale's motion failed by a 4–1 vote despite the trustees, president, and prospective sexton all being members of the same party. Yale resigned, and the trustees called a special election that took place on May 13. Sherman ran against two white candidates for the presidency and won by a margin of twenty votes (no exact tally has been located). “I am a Republican by color, a Democrat by affinity, a Greenbacker by conviction, and was elected on a Know-nothing ticket," he told the Lakeside Press in May 1878. The newspapers mocked his election as a "matter of burlesque" resulting from "a moment of pique" against the outgoing president, but Sherman served out his one-year term with reputed dignity and practicality before retiring from public office and campaigning for Yale's reelection as president.

In 1883, Sherman ran for an open seat on the village board but garnered only 21% of the vote, receiving eight out of the thirty-eight ballots cast.

== Personal life ==
Circa 1851, Sherman married a Black woman and Oswego County native named Elizabeth. The couple had four daughters and one son. After Elizabeth died, Sherman married Harriet Wilson. He died in 1907, claiming to be one hundred years old.

== See also ==
- List of first African-American mayors
