= Asa and Caroline Wing House =

Historic house in New York, United States

- U.S. National Register of Historic Places
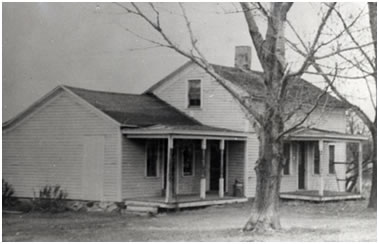

- Location within New York Location within the United States
- Location: 3392 NY 69; Mexico, New York
- Coordinates: 43°25′15″N 76°9′52″W
- Area: 13 acres (5.3 ha)
- Built: 1847
- Architectural style: Mid 19th Century Revival
- MPS: Freedom Trail, Abolitionism, and African American Life in Central New York MPS
- NRHP reference No.: 01001317
- Added to NRHP: December 04, 2001

Asa and Caroline Wing House is a historic home located at Mexico in Oswego County, New York. It was probably built in the 1830s and is a 1 1/2-story frame settlement period structure. It has a fieldstone foundation, post and beam construction, plank walls, and gable roof. Asa and Caroline Wing purchased the home in 1847. It is a well-documented location used in harboring fugitive slaves. Specifically, from December 24–27, 1850, Asa Wing harbored seven members of the Thompson family in their flight to Canada.

It was listed on the National Register of Historic Places in 2001.

Caroline M. Mitchell Wing (1821–1889) married Asa Wing in 1843; he died in 1853.
