= Carley's Mills Schoolhouse =

- U.S. National Register of Historic Places
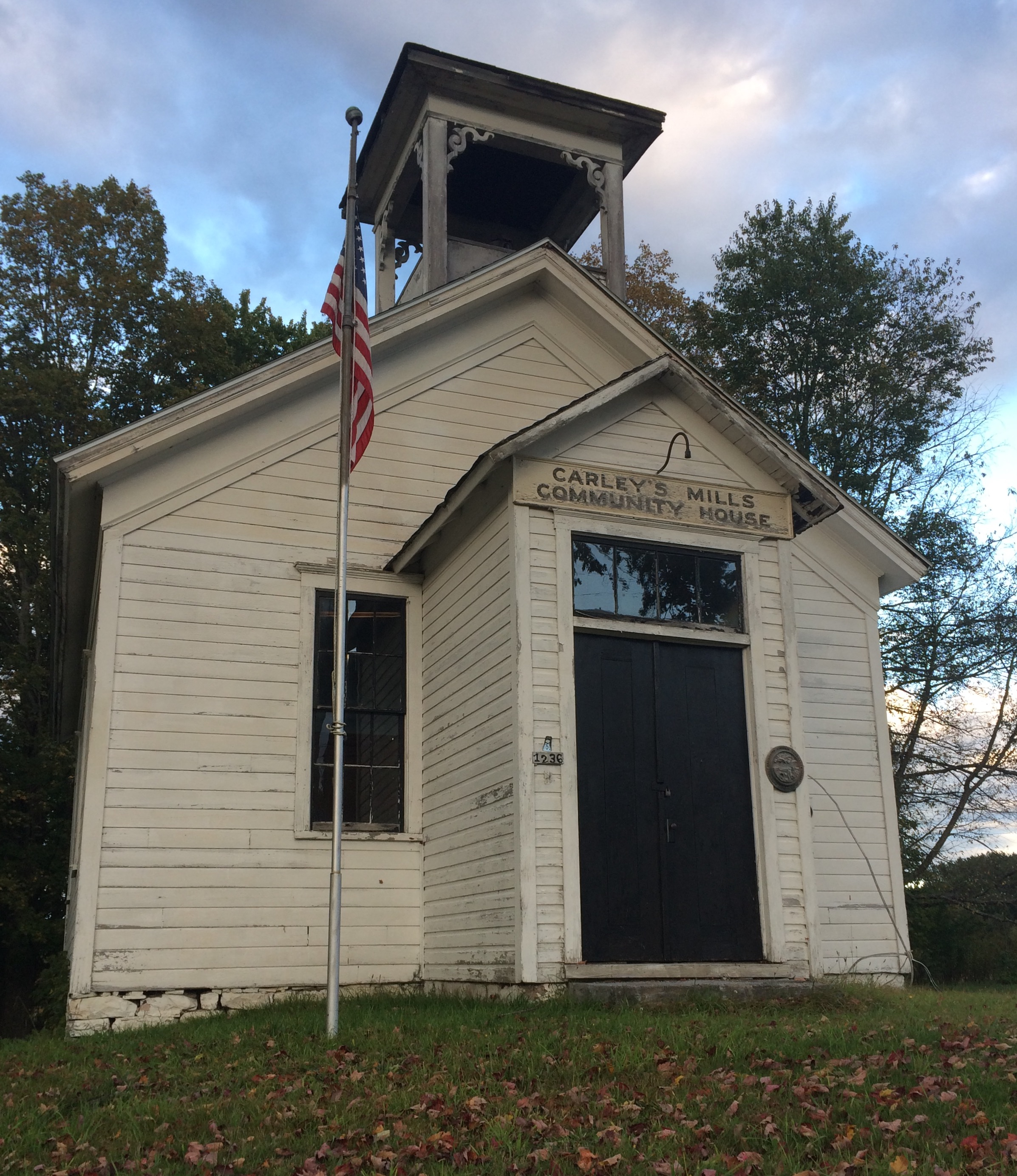

- Location within New York Location within the United States
- Nearest city: Hastings, New York
- Coordinates: 43°22′24″N 76°7′2″W
- Area: less than one acre
- Built: 1870
- NRHP reference No.: 04001449
- Added to NRHP: January 5, 2005

Carley's Mills Schoolhouse is a historic one-room school building located at Hastings in Oswego County, New York. It is a modestly scaled, one story frame building built about 1870. On the rooftop is a hipped roof belfry, which still retains what appears to be the original bell. Also on the property is a cast iron water pump. It ceased being used as a school in 1953.

It was listed on the National Register of Historic Places in 2005.
