= Woodruff Block =

Historic commercial building in New York, United States

- U.S. National Register of Historic Places
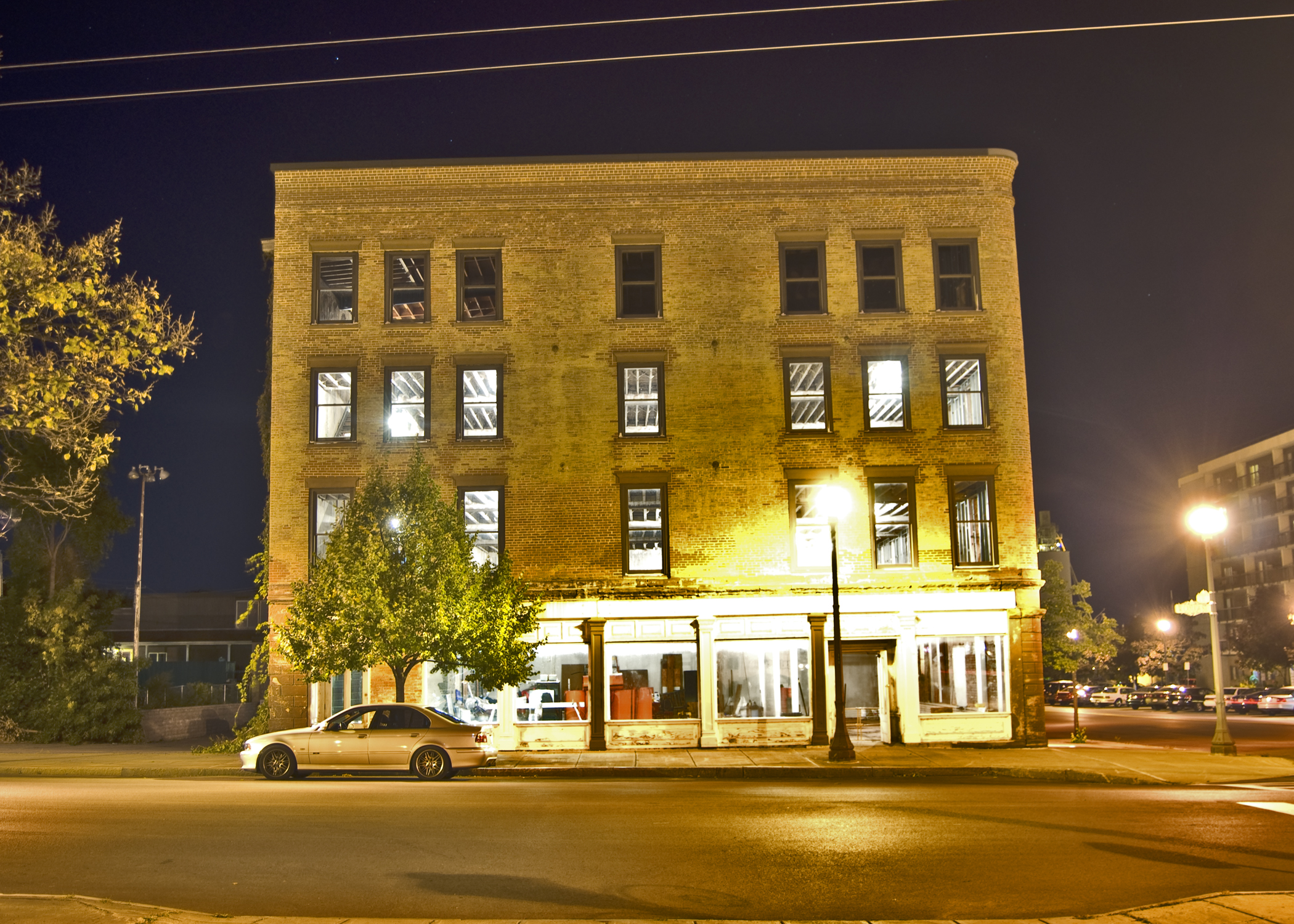
- Woodruff Building at its purchase and start of new development in October of 2010.

- Location within New York Location within the United States
- Location: 17 W. Cayuga St., Oswego, New York
- Coordinates: 43°27′28″N 76°30′46″W
- Area: less than one acre
- Architectural style: Greek Revival
- NRHP reference No.: 95000473
- Added to NRHP: April 20, 1995

Woodruff Block is a historic commercial building located at Oswego in Oswego County, New York. It is a four-story masonry structure built about 1840 and modified between 1900 and 1930. It features rectangular cut stone columns with Doric capitals in the Greek Revival style. When built it was located strategically at the terminus of the 1828 Oswego Canal.

It was listed on the National Register of Historic Places in 1995.
