= Hamilton and Rhoda Littlefield House =

Historic house in New York, United States

- U.S. National Register of Historic Places
- Location within New York Location within the United States
- Location: 44 E. Oneida St., Oswego, New York
- Coordinates: 43°27′25″N 76°30′16″W
- Area: less than one acre
- Built: 1836
- Architectural style: Federal
- MPS: Freedom Trail, Abolitionism, and African American Life in Central New York MPS
- NRHP reference No.: 02000051
- Added to NRHP: February 26, 2002

Hamilton and Rhoda Littlefield House is a historic home located at Oswego in Oswego County, New York. It is a two-story frame vernacular Federal style residence built about 1834 and remodeled in the 1920s. In 1853, Hamilton Littlefield sheltered one fugitive slave sent to him by Gerrit Smith's agent John B. Edwards, and later sheltered 15 freedom seekers all at once. Therefore, the house is documented to have been used as a way station on the Underground Railroad.

It was listed on the National Register of Historic Places in 2002.
