= Stillman Farmstead =

- U.S. National Register of Historic Places
- U.S. Historic district
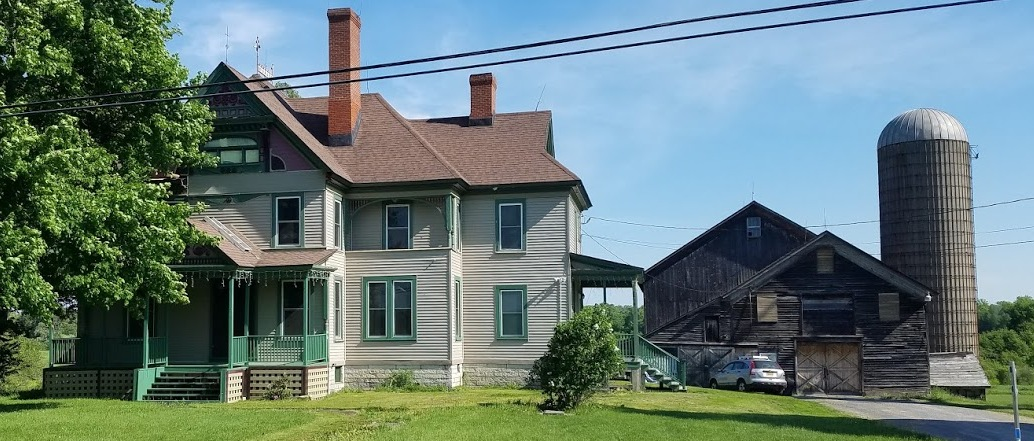
- Farmhouse (1889), garage (c 1905), and barn (1840)

- Location within New York Location within the United States
- Nearest city: Mexico, New York
- Coordinates: 43°27′33″N 76°9′47″W
- Area: 92.5 acres (37.4 ha)
- Built: 1889
- Built by: Henry Stillman
- Architectural style: Queen Anne
- MPS: Mexico MPS
- NRHP reference No.: 91000525
- Added to NRHP: June 20, 1991

Stillman Farmstead is a historic farm complex and national historic district located at Mexico in Oswego County, New York. The district includes three contributing structures; the farmhouse, a mid-19th-century barn (1840), and a large garage (c. 1905). The farmhouse is a 2 1/2-story frame building built in 1889 in the Queen Anne style.

It was listed on the National Register of Historic Places in 1991.
