= Parish (village), New York =

Parish, New York
- Village
- Location in Oswego County and the state of New York.
- Coordinates: 43°24′20″N 76°7′34″W
- Country: United States
- State: New York
- County: Oswego

Area
  - Total: 1.58 sq mi (4.08 km^{2})
  - Land: 1.58 sq mi (4.08 km^{2})
  - Water: 0 sq mi (0.00 km^{2})
- Elevation: 495 ft (151 m)

Population (2020)
  - Total: 447
  - Density: 284.0/sq mi (109.64/km^{2})
- Time zone: UTC-5 (Eastern (EST))
  - Summer (DST): UTC-4 (EDT)
- ZIP code: 13131
- Area code: 315
- FIPS code: 36-56341
- GNIS feature ID: 0959863

Parish is a village located in the town of Parish, in Oswego County, New York, United States. This village is part of the Syracuse metropolitan area. Its population was 447 as of the census of 2020.

== History ==
The Pleasant Lawn Cemetery was listed on the National Register of Historic Places in 2005.

== Geography ==
Parish is located at 43°24′20″N 76°7′33″W (43.40558, -76.12608).

According to the United States Census Bureau, the village has a total area of 1.5 square miles (4.0 km^{2}), all land.

== Demographics ==
Historical population
Census	Pop.	Note	%±
1880	402		—
1890	541		34.6%
1900	548		1.3%
1910	490		−10.6%
1920	476		−2.9%
1930	508		6.7%
1940	521		2.6%
1950	574		10.2%
1960	567		−1.2%
1970	634		11.8%
1980	535		−15.6%
1990	473		−11.6%
2000	512		8.2%
2010	450		−12.1%
2020	447		−0.7%
U.S. Decennial Census

As of the census of 2000, there were 512 people, 191 households, and 132 families. The population density was 332.8 inhabitants per square mile (128.5/km^{2}). There were 212 housing units at an average density of 137.8 per square mile (53.2/km^{2}).

There were 191 households, out of which 39.3% had children under the age of 18 living with them, 55.5% were married couples living together, 11.0% had a female householder with no husband present, and 30.4% were non-families. 24.6% of all households were made up of individuals, and 12.0% had someone living alone who was 65 years of age or older. The average household size was 2.68 and the average family size was 3.26.

In the village, the population was spread out, with 31.1% under the age of 18, 8.0% from 18 to 24, 29.7% from 25 to 44, 18.6% from 45 to 64, and 12.7% who were 65 years of age or older. The median age was 36 years. For every 100 females, there were 96.2 males. For every 100 females age 18 and over, there were 96.1 males.

The median income for a household in the village was $35,903, and the median income for a family was $40,893. Males had a median income of $31,771 versus $21,250 for females. The per capita income for the village was $14,902. About 80.5% of families and 60.5% of the population were below the poverty line, including 0.0% of those under age 18 and 20.5% of those age 65 or over.

Parish is also home to Bass Lake Resort.
