= Smith H. Barlow House =

Historic house in New York, United States

- U.S. National Register of Historic Places
- Location within New York Location within the United States
- Location: Harwood Dr., Lacona, New York
- Coordinates: 43°38′36″N 76°4′30″W
- Area: 1 acre (0.40 ha)
- Built: 1898
- Architect: Barlow, Smith H.
- Architectural style: Queen Anne, Eclectic Queen Anne
- MPS: Sandy Creek MRA
- NRHP reference No.: 88002214
- Added to NRHP: November 15, 1988

The Smith H. Barlow House is a historic house located at Harwood Drive in Lacona, Oswego County, New York.

== Description and history ==
It was built about 1898, and is a 2 1/2-story, frame Queen Anne–style structure consisting of a rectangular main block, 2 1/2-story east wing, and one-story gabled rear wing. It features a 2 1/2-story square tower and one-story entry porch. Also on the property is a contemporary carriage house.

It was listed on the National Register of Historic Places on November 15, 1988.
