= Pleasant Lawn Cemetery =

Historic cemetery in Oswego County, New York, US

- U.S. National Register of Historic Places
- Location within New York Location within the United States
- Location: NY 69A, Parish, New York
- Coordinates: 43°24′07″N 76°08′26″W
- Area: 11.5 acres (4.7 ha)
- Architect: Granger, Merton Elwood
- Architectural style: Gothic Revival
- NRHP reference No.: 05001125
- Added to NRHP: October 5, 2005

Pleasant Lawn Cemetery is a historic cemetery located at Parish in Oswego County, New York. It was first used as a burial ground in 1814 and formally incorporated in 1871. Within the boundaries of this contributing site are three contributing buildings; a 19th-century receiving vault, the Mills-Petrie Mausoleum of 1899, and the Mills-Petrie Chapel of 1917. The earliest gravestones date from 1825.

It was listed on the National Register of Historic Places in 2005.

US Representative Hadwen C. Fuller (1895–1990) is buried there.
