= Trinity Church (Constantia, New York) =

Historic church in New York, United States

- U.S. National Register of Historic Places
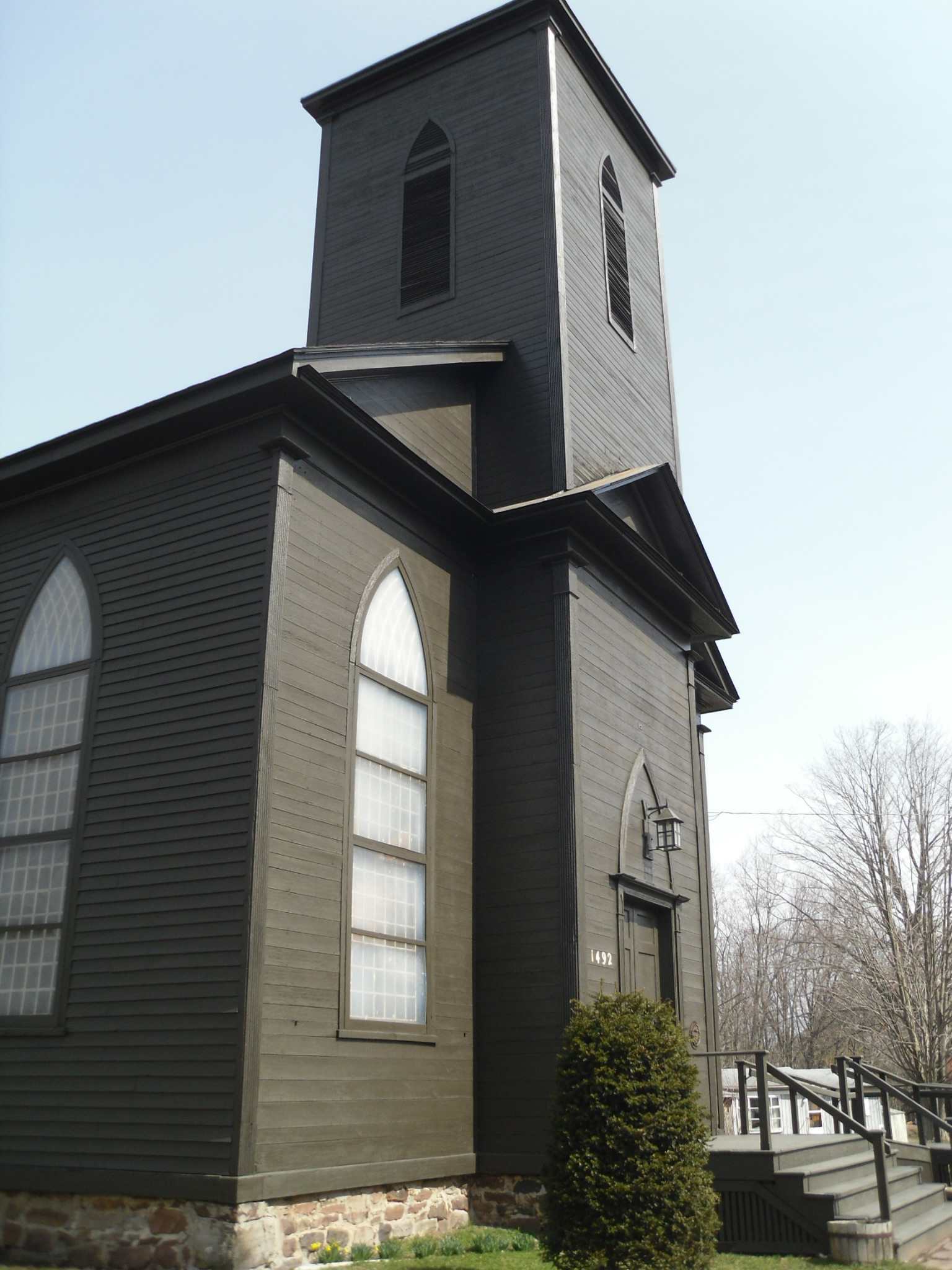
- Trinity Church, March 2010

- Location within New York Location within the United States
- Location: NY 49, Constantia, New York
- Coordinates: 43°14′52″N 76°0′29″W
- Area: 2 acres (0.81 ha)
- Built: 1834
- Architectural style: Federal
- NRHP reference No.: 82001231
- Added to NRHP: October 29, 1982

Trinity Church is a historic Episcopal church located at Constantia in Oswego County, New York. It is a small frame vernacular Federal style structure completed in 1831–1834. The last record of it having been painted is 1851. Also on the property is a cemetery with most gravestones dating to the mid 19th century. William H. Baker (1827-1911) is interred in the cemetery.

It was listed on the National Register of Historic Places in 1982.
