= First Baptist Church (Sandy Creek, New York) =

Historic church in New York, United States

- U.S. National Register of Historic Places
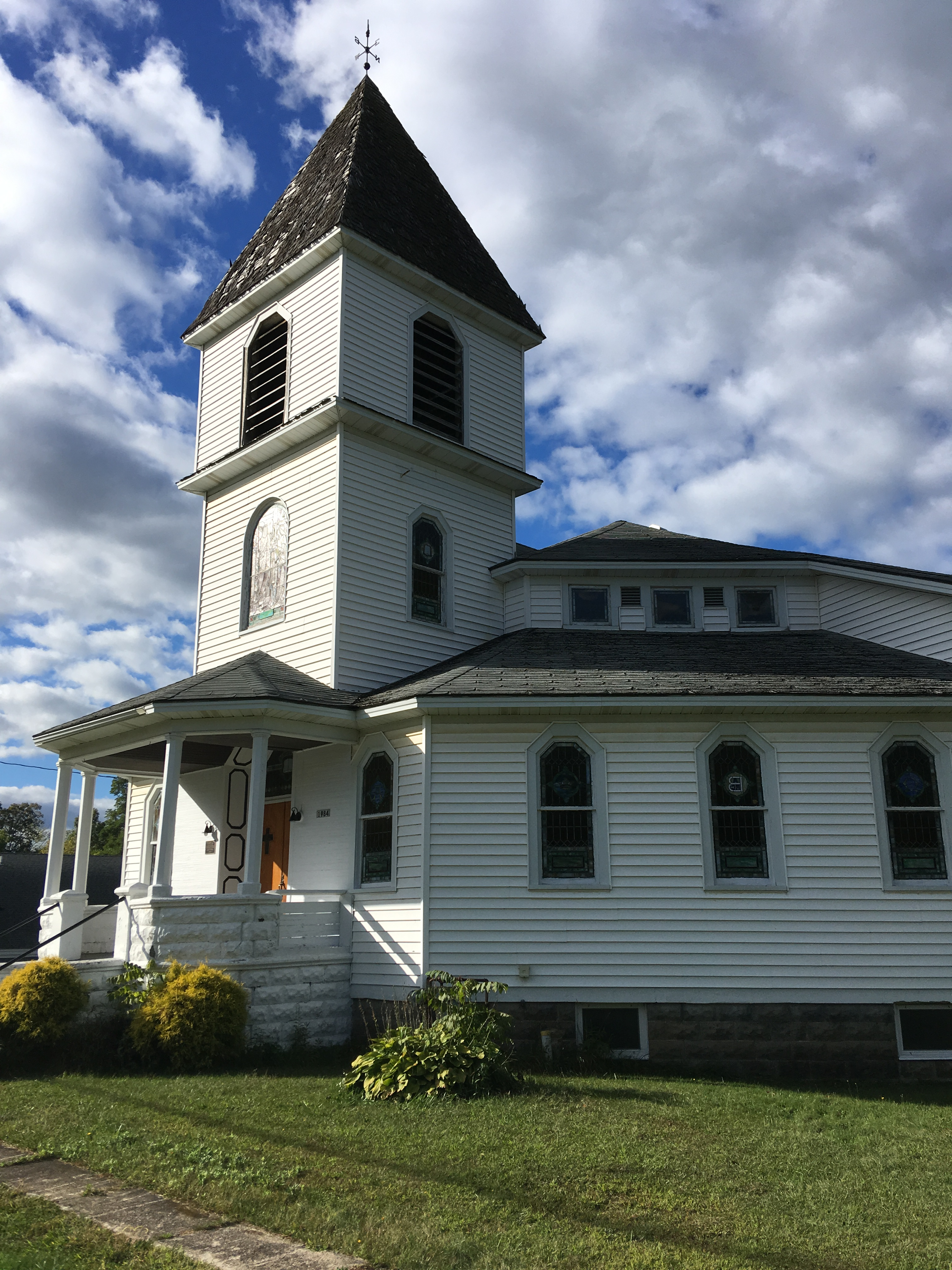

- Location within New York Location within the United States
- Location: Harwood Dr., Sandy Creek, New York
- Coordinates: 43°38′38″N 76°4′40″W
- Area: 0.2 acres (0.081 ha)
- Built: 1917
- Architect: Salisbury, Charles M.
- MPS: Sandy Creek MRA
- NRHP reference No.: 88002218
- Added to NRHP: November 15, 1988

First Baptist Church is a historic Baptist church located at Sandy Creek in Oswego County, New York. It was built in 1917–1918 and is a 1 1/2-story frame church with an octagonal plan and a pyramidal roof. The front of the building features a three-stage rooftop tower. The interior layout is based on the Akron plan.

It was listed on the National Register of Historic Places in 1988.
