= Standard Yarn Company Building =

- U.S. National Register of Historic Places
- Location within New York Location within the United States
- Location: 317 W. 1st St., Oswego, New York
- Coordinates: 43°27′8″N 76°30′30″W
- Area: 1.7 acres (0.69 ha)
- Built: 1897
- NRHP reference No.: 08000410
- Added to NRHP: May 15, 2008

Standard Yarn Company Building is a historic factory building located at Oswego in Oswego County, New York. It is a brick structure, measuring 200 feet along the street and constructed in three sections between 1897 and 1911. It is of common mill construction with load bearing masonry walls and wooden floors and joists supported by heavy wooden posts.

It was listed on the National Register of Historic Places in 2008.
