= Charles M. Salisbury House =

Historic house in New York, United States

- U.S. National Register of Historic Places
- Location within New York Location within the United States
- Location: 9089 Church St., Lacona, New York
- Coordinates: 43°38′29″N 76°4′6″W
- Area: 0.3 acres (0.12 ha)
- Built: 1907
- MPS: Sandy Creek MRA
- NRHP reference No.: 88002217
- Added to NRHP: November 15, 1988

Charles M. Salisbury House is a historic home located at Lacona in Oswego County, New York. It was built in 1907 and is a 1 1/2-story, clapboard residence with a square plan, steeply pitched multi-gabled roof, an asymmetrical facade, and irregular fenestration. The facade features a large fixed-pane window with stained glass. Also on the property is a contemporary carriage house and a small residence.

It was listed on the National Register of Historic Places in 1988.
