= Methodist Church (Sandy Creek, New York) =

Historic church in New York, United States

- U.S. National Register of Historic Places
- Location within New York Location within the United States
- Location: Harwood Dr., Sandy Creek, New York
- Coordinates: 43°38′37″N 76°4′58″W
- Area: 0.2 acres (0.081 ha)
- Built: 1878
- Architect: Tucker, Winslow
- Architectural style: Gothic, High Victorian Gothic
- MPS: Sandy Creek MRA
- NRHP reference No.: 88002213
- Added to NRHP: November 15, 1988

Methodist Church is a historic Methodist church located at Sandy Creek in Oswego County, New York. It was built in 1878 and is a two-story brick High Victorian Gothic style building with a rectangular plan. It features a steeply pitched slate roof and a three tiered tower.

It was listed on the National Register of Historic Places in 1988.
