= St. James' Church (Cleveland, New York) =

Historic church in New York, United States

- U.S. National Register of Historic Places
- Location within New York Location within the United States
- Location: North St., jct. with Bridge St., Cleveland, New York
- Coordinates: 43°14′2″N 75°52′56″W
- Area: less than one acre
- Built: 1867
- Architect: Wood, Reverend H. Gaylord
- Architectural style: Gothic Revival
- MPS: Historic Churches of the Episcopal Diocese of Central New York MPS
- NRHP reference No.: 96000958
- Added to NRHP: August 30, 1996

St. James' Church is a historic Episcopal church located at Cleveland in Oswego County, New York. It is a frame Gothic Revival style structure built in 1867. It is a 28-by-70-foot (8.5 by 21.3 m) rectangular board and batten building composed of a nave, front entry, chancel, and tower which rests on a random coursed stone foundation.

It was listed on the National Register of Historic Places in 1996.
