= Samuel Sadler House =

Historic house in New York, United States

- U.S. National Register of Historic Places
- Location within New York Location within the United States
- Location: N. Main St., Sandy Creek, New York
- Coordinates: 43°38′55″N 76°5′7″W
- Area: 1 acre (0.40 ha)
- Built: 1870
- Architect: Sadler, Samuel
- Architectural style: Italianate
- MPS: Sandy Creek MRA
- NRHP reference No.: 88002212
- Added to NRHP: November 15, 1988

Samuel Sadler House is a historic home located at Sandy Creek in Oswego County, New York. It was built about 1870 and is a 2-story, red brick Italianate-style structure consisting of a 2-story, three-bay main block and 1 1/2-story, four-bay side wing and 1-story rear wing. Also on the property is a contemporary carriage house.

It was listed on the National Register of Historic Places in 1988.
