= Daniel and Miriam Pease House =

Historic house in New York, United States

- U.S. National Register of Historic Places
- Location within New York Location within the United States
- Location: 361 Cemetery Rd., Oswego, New York
- Coordinates: 43°25′35.5″N 76°33′17.6″W
- Area: 84 acres (34 ha)
- Built: 1826
- Architectural style: Federal
- MPS: Freedom Trail, Abolitionism, and African American Life in Central New York MPS
- NRHP reference No.: 02000053
- Added to NRHP: February 26, 2002

Daniel and Miriam Pease House is a historic home located at Oswego in Oswego County, New York. It is a five bay, two story frame Federal style residence with a one-story rear wing. Also on the property is a three-story timber framed barn. Its owners, Daniel and Miriam Pease, were noted abolitionists and the house is documented as having been used as a way station on the Underground Railroad.

It was listed on the National Register of Historic Places in 2002.
