= Fred Smart House =

Historic house in New York, United States

- U.S. National Register of Historic Places
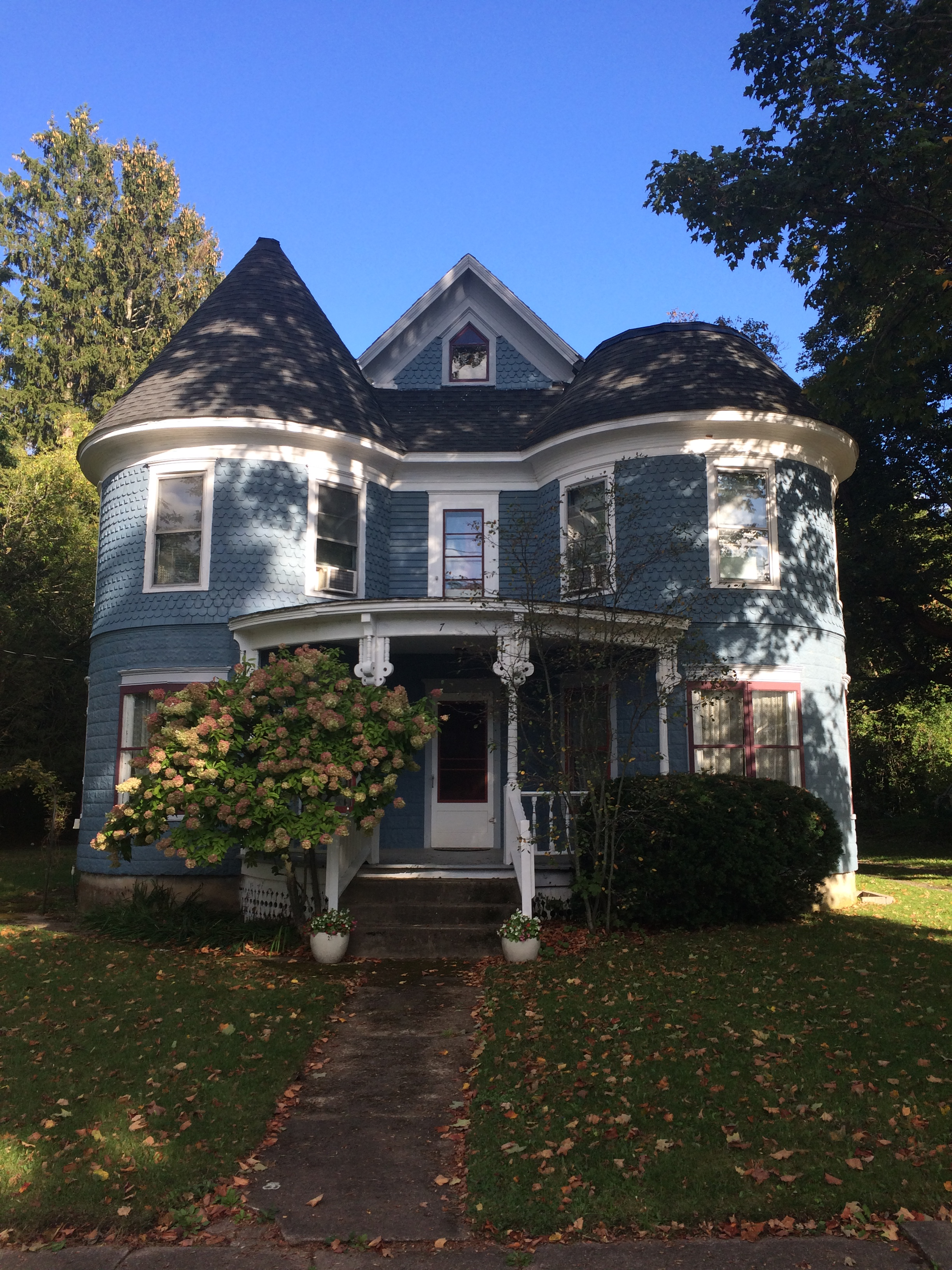

- Location within New York Location within the United States
- Location: Salina St., Lacona, New York
- Coordinates: 43°38′35″N 76°4′8″W
- Area: 0.4 acres (0.16 ha)
- Built: 1900
- Architect: Smart, Fred
- Architectural style: Queen Anne
- MPS: Sandy Creek MRA
- NRHP reference No.: 88002215
- Added to NRHP: November 15, 1988

Fred Smart House is a historic home in Lacona in Oswego County, New York. It was built about 1900 and is a two-story frame Queen Anne-style residence consisting of a rectangular, gabled main block with a round tower attached to each of its two front corners. Also on the property are a contributing carriage house and pergola.

It was listed on the National Register of Historic Places in 1988.
