= Nathan and Clarissa Green House =

Historic house in New York, United States

- U.S. National Register of Historic Places
- Location within New York Location within the United States
- Location: 98 West Eight St., Oswego, New York
- Coordinates: 43°27′22″N 76°31′13″W
- Area: less than one acre
- Built: 1849
- Architectural style: Greek Revival
- MPS: Freedom Trail, Abolitionism, and African American Life in Central New York MPS
- NRHP reference No.: 02000054
- Added to NRHP: February 26, 2002

Nathan and Clarissa Green House is a historic home located at Oswego in Oswego County, New York. It is a two-story wood-frame residence with a gabled, three-bay facade and side entrance, built about 1849 with Greek Revival details. It was built by Nathan Green, an African American and fugitive slave, who purchased the lot from Gerrit Smith. It is located next to the John and Harriet McKenzie House.

It was listed on the National Register of Historic Places in 2002.
