= Constantia (CDP), New York =

Constantia, New York
- CDP
- Location in Oswego County and the state of New York.
- Coordinates: 43°15′3″N 76°0′6″W
- Country: United States
- State: New York
- County: Oswego

Area
  - Total: 3.04 sq mi (7.87 km^{2})
  - Land: 3.03 sq mi (7.85 km^{2})
  - Water: 0.0077 sq mi (0.02 km^{2})
- Elevation: 384 ft (117 m)

Population (2020)
  - Total: 1,109
  - Density: 365.9/sq mi (141.26/km^{2})
- Time zone: UTC-5 (Eastern (EST))
  - Summer (DST): UTC-4 (EDT)
- ZIP code: 13044
- Area code: 315
- FIPS code: 36-17893
- GNIS feature ID: 0947327

Constantia is a census-designated place (CDP) in the town of Constantia in Oswego County, New York, United States. Located on Oneida Lake, the community lies along State Route 49 and Scriba Creek. The population was 1,182 at the 2010 census.

== History ==
Constantia was incorporated as a village in 1836, but abandoned that status in 1923.

The Trinity Church was listed on the National Register of Historic Places in 1982.

== Geography ==
Constantia is located at 43°15′3″N 76°0′5″W (43.250905, -76.001641).

According to the United States Census Bureau, the CDP has a total area of 2.1 square miles (5.5 km^{2}), of which 2.1 square miles (5.5 km^{2}) is land and 0.47% is water.

== Demographics ==
Historical population
Census	Pop.	Note	%±
2020	1,109		—
U.S. Decennial Census

As of the census of 2000, there were 1,107 people, 436 households, and 303 families residing in the CDP. The population density was 518.8 inhabitants per square mile (200.3/km^{2}). There were 560 housing units at an average density of 262.5 per square mile (101.4/km^{2}). The racial makeup of the CDP was 97.92% White, 0.18% Black or African American, 0.90% Native American, 0.18% Asian, 0.09% Pacific Islander, 0.09% from other races, and 0.63% from two or more races. Hispanic or Latino of any race were 0.36% of the population.

There were 436 households, out of which 35.1% had children under the age of 18 living with them, 54.8% were married couples living together, 8.7% had a female householder with no husband present, and 30.3% were non-families. 23.4% of all households were made up of individuals, and 8.3% had someone living alone who was 65 years of age or older. The average household size was 2.54 and the average family size was 2.98.

In the CDP, the population was spread out, with 27.3% under the age of 18, 6.0% from 18 to 24, 30.5% from 25 to 44, 25.8% from 45 to 64, and 10.4% who were 65 years of age or older. The median age was 38 years. For every 100 females, there were 102.4 males. For every 100 females age 18 and over, there were 100.7 males.

The median income for a household in the CDP was $41,307, and the median income for a family was $44,844. Males had a median income of $30,568 versus $22,417 for females. The per capita income for the CDP was $16,279. About 4.0% of families and 8.6% of the population were below the poverty line, including 9.5% of those under age 18 and none of those age 65 or over.
