= Slack Farmstead =

- U.S. National Register of Historic Places
- U.S. Historic district
- Location within New York Location within the United States
- Nearest city: Mexico, New York
- Coordinates: 43°27′7″N 76°11′7″W
- Area: 38.4 acres (15.5 ha)
- Built: 1838
- Architectural style: Early Republic
- MPS: Mexico MPS
- NRHP reference No.: 91001627
- Added to NRHP: November 14, 1991

Slack Farmstead is a historic farm complex and national historic district located at Mexico in Oswego County, New York. The district includes four contributing structures; the farmhouse, a dairy barn (1870), granary (c. 1850) and a hen house (c. 1910). Also on the property are a contributing stone wall, hand-dug well, and farm pond. The farmhouse is a five-bay, 1 1/2-story frame building with a gable roof built about 1838.

It was listed on the National Register of Historic Places in 1991.
