= Cleveland, New York =

- Village
- Location in Oswego County and the state of New York.
- Coordinates: 43°14′11″N 75°52′58″W
- Country: United States
- State: New York
- County: Oswego

Government
  - Mayor: Laureen Tackman
  - Deputy Mayor: Robin Wilson

Area
  - Total: 1.22 sq mi (3.17 km^{2})
  - Land: 1.13 sq mi (2.93 km^{2})
  - Water: 0.093 sq mi (0.24 km^{2})
- Elevation: 436 ft (133 m)

Population (2020)
  - Total: 732
  - Density: 647/sq mi (249.8/km^{2})
- Time zone: UTC-5 (Eastern (EST))
  - Summer (DST): UTC-4 (EDT)
- ZIP code: 13042
- Area code: 315
- FIPS code: 36-16188
- GNIS feature ID: 0946846
- Website: www.villageofcleveland-ny.us

Cleveland is a village in Oswego County, New York, United States. As of the 2020 census, Cleveland had a population of 732. The village is located at the eastern boundary of the town of Constantia on NY Route 49 .

== History ==
The village of Cleveland was incorporated in 1857. Much of the 19th century industry was based on glass manufacturing from the Cleveland Glass Company and the Union Glass Company (Of Cleveland, NY).

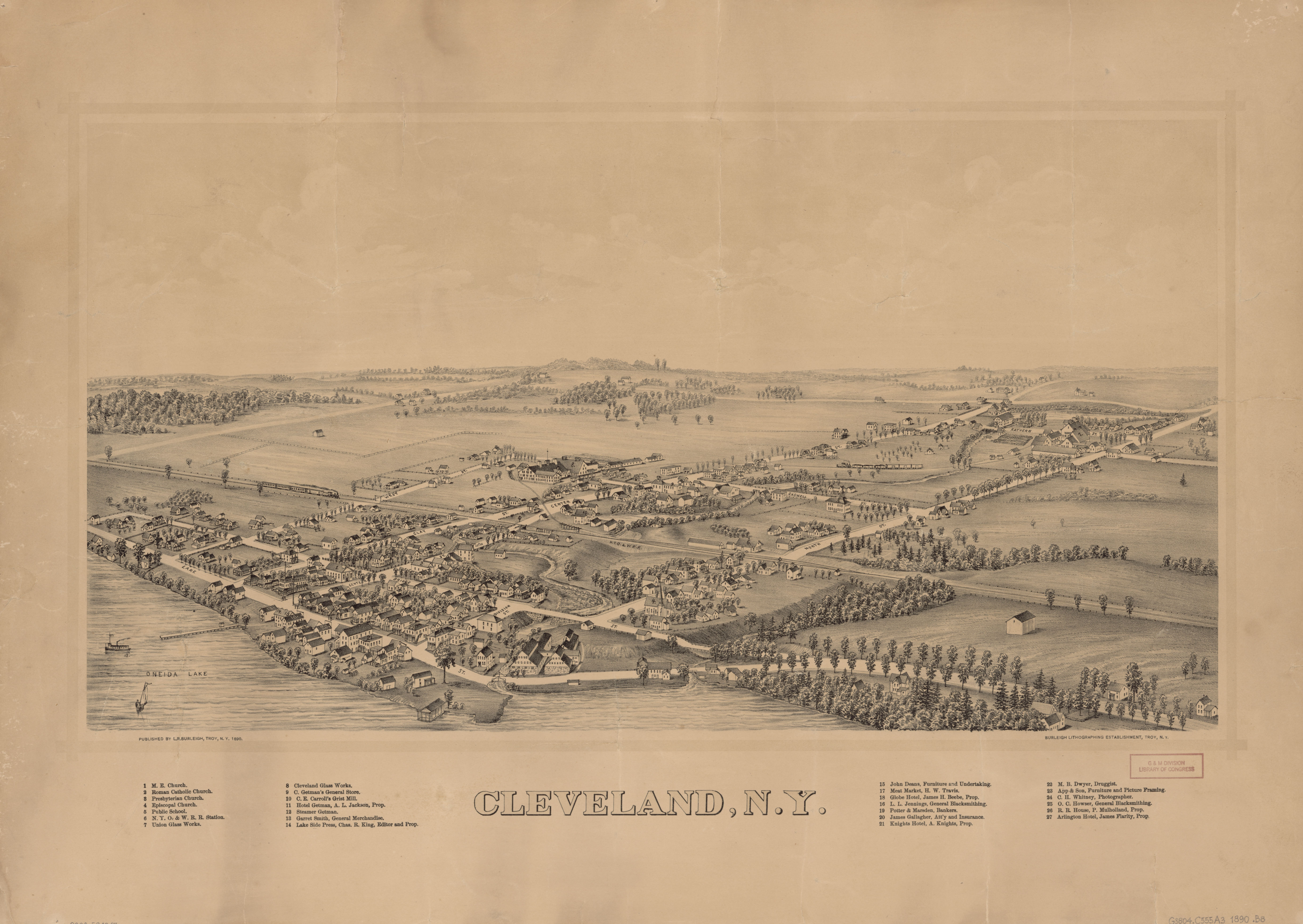
Perspective map of Cleveland and list of landmarks from 1890 published by L.R Burleigh

During its existence, the New York Ontario and Western Railway ran through Cleveland. Some say the town is named after Cleveland, England and other claim it is named after James Cleveland, an early settler.

In 2007, over one hundred village residents signed a petition to dissolve the village. The petition was rejected on technical grounds, but the village board formed a committee to study the implications of dissolution and alternatives, including increased efficiency via intermunicipal cooperation.

The St. James' Church was listed on the National Register of Historic Places in 1996.

== Geography ==
Cleveland is located at 43°14′11″N 75°52′58″W (43.236502, -75.882705).

According to the United States Census Bureau, the village has a total area of 1.2 square miles (3.1 km^{2}), of which 1.1 square miles (2.8 km^{2}) is land and 0.1 square miles (0.26 km^{2}) (8.13%) is water.

The village is on the North Shore of Oneida Lake and on the border of Oneida County.

== Demographics ==
Historical population
Census	Pop.	Note	%±
1860	902		—
1870	895		−0.8%
1880	724		−19.1%
1890	839		15.9%
1900	689		−17.9%
1910	687		−0.3%
1920	541		−21.3%
1930	416		−23.1%
1940	440		5.8%
1950	555		26.1%
1960	732		31.9%
1970	821		12.2%
1980	855		4.1%
1990	784		−8.3%
2000	758		−3.3%
2010	750		−1.1%
2020	732		−2.4%
U.S. Decennial Census

As of the census of 2000, there were 758 people, 277 households, and 198 families residing in the village. The population density was 673.5 inhabitants per square mile (260.0/km^{2}). There were 310 housing units at an average density of 275.4 per square mile (106.3/km^{2}). The racial makeup of the village was 99.34% White, 0.13% African American, 0.13% Native American, 0.26% from other races, and 0.13% from two or more races. Hispanic or Latino of any race were 0.26% of the population.

There were 277 households, out of which 38.3% had children under the age of 18 living with them, 56.3% were married couples living together, 10.5% had a female householder with no husband present, and 28.5% were non-families. 22.0% of all households were made up of individuals, and 5.4% had someone living alone who was 65 years of age or older. The average household size was 2.74 and the average family size was 3.20.

In the village, the population was spread out, with 30.2% under the age of 18, 6.1% from 18 to 24, 31.9% from 25 to 44, 22.2% from 45 to 64, and 9.6% who were 65 years of age or older. The median age was 36 years. For every 100 females, there were 112.3 males. For every 100 females age 18 and over, there were 108.3 males.

The median income for a household in the village was $32,313, and the median income for a family was $42,250. Males had a median income of $30,739 versus $21,985 for females. The per capita income for the village was $15,366. About 9.6% of families and 12.4% of the population were below the poverty line, including 14.3% of those under age 18 and 5.6% of those age 65 or over.

== Notable people ==
- Eugenie Maria Morenus, mathematics professor at Sweet Briar College from 1909 to 1946; born in Cleveland
- Geoff Roes⁣ – Elite Ultramarathon Runner Raised on the shores of Oneida Lake, Geoff attended Cleveland Elementary and went on to star in Track & Cross-Country for the Central Square Redmen before a brief but successful running career at Syracuse University. Geoff owns course records in every 100-mile race he has ever run, as well as numerous course records and wins at distances ranging from 25 miles (ca. 40 km) to 100+. Roes was the recipient of the 2009 Ultra Runner of the Year award.
- Edward "Ned" Sherman, the first African American elected to serve as mayor in New York, was elected in Cleveland in 1878.
- Claudia Tenney, U.S. representative for New York
- The incumbent mayor is Ms. Laureen Tackman. The incumbent Deputy Mayor is Robin Wilson.

== See also ==
- List of Villages in New York
