= John and Harriet McKenzie House =

Historic house in New York, United States

- U.S. National Register of Historic Places
- Location within New York Location within the United States
- Location: 96 W. Eighth St., Oswego, New York
- Coordinates: 43°27′23″N 76°31′13″W
- Area: less than one acre
- Architectural style: Greek Revival
- MPS: Freedom Trail, Abolitionism, and African American Life in Central New York MPS
- NRHP reference No.: 01001314
- Added to NRHP: December 04, 2001

John and Harriet McKenzie House is a historic home located at Oswego in Oswego County, New York. It is a 1 1/2-story, rectangular frame residence with Greek Revival details. Its owner John McKenzie was a former fugitive slave who built the house about 1847. Two years later Nathan and Clarissa Green built their house next door.

It was listed on the National Register of Historic Places in 2001.
