= Montcalm Park Historic District =

Historic district in New York, United States

- U.S. National Register of Historic Places
- U.S. Historic district
- Location within New York Location within the United States
- Location: Roughly Montcalm St., W 6th St., W. Schuyler St., and Bronson St., vic. of Montcalm Park, Oswego, New York
- Coordinates: 43°27′35″N 76°31′11″W
- Area: 15 acres (6.1 ha)
- Built: 1847
- Architect: Ranlett, William; Stevens, Zina
- Architectural style: Italian Villa, Colonial Revival
- NRHP reference No.: 01000555
- Added to NRHP: May 25, 2001

Montcalm Park Historic District is a national historic district located at Oswego in Oswego County, New York. The district includes 28 contributing buildings, one contributing site, and three contributing structures. The centerpiece of the district is Montcalm Park, a two-acre landscaped park dedicated in 1913. The park was once the site of a military fort called Fort George, built by the British in 1755 and destroyed by the French commander Louis-Joseph de Montcalm in 1756. The site is now Montcalm Park, bordered by West Schulyer Street, Montcalm Street and West 6th Street.

It was listed on the National Register of Historic Places in 2001.
