= Hunter-Oliphant Block =

Historic commercial building in New York, United States

- U.S. National Register of Historic Places
- Location within New York
- Location: 215-219 W. First St., Oswego, New York
- Coordinates: 43°27′20″N 76°30′39″W
- Area: less than one acre
- Built: 1880
- Architectural style: Italianate
- NRHP reference No.: 95000880
- Added to NRHP: July 21, 1995

Hunter-Oliphant Block, also known as Browne-Davis Furniture Store, is a historic commercial building located at Oswego in Oswego County, New York. It consists of adjacent brick buildings under single ownership; the three-story Hunter Building, built in 1882, and the Oliphant Building, built in 1880 as a three-story building with a fourth story added in the 1890s. The buildings exhibits Italianate design details. The first floor has cast-iron storefronts. The buildings have a common history dating to 1909 when they were combined as a single furniture store.

It was listed on the National Register of Historic Places in 1995.
