= Newman Tuttle House =

Historic house in New York, United States

- U.S. National Register of Historic Places
- Location within New York Location within the United States
- Location: Harwood Dr. at Ridge Rd., Lacona, New York
- Coordinates: 43°38′37″N 76°3′51″W
- Area: 0.5 acres (0.20 ha)
- Built: 1871
- MPS: Sandy Creek MRA
- NRHP reference No.: 88002211
- Added to NRHP: November 15, 1988

Newman Tuttle House is a historic home located at Lacona in Oswego County, New York. It was built about 1871 and is a two-story, clapboard vernacular residence consisting of a rectangular, three-bay main block and a slightly lower rear wing, both with shallow pitched gable roofs.

It was listed on the National Register of Historic Places in 1988.
