= Walton and Willett Stone Store =

Historic commercial building in New York, United States

- U.S. National Register of Historic Places
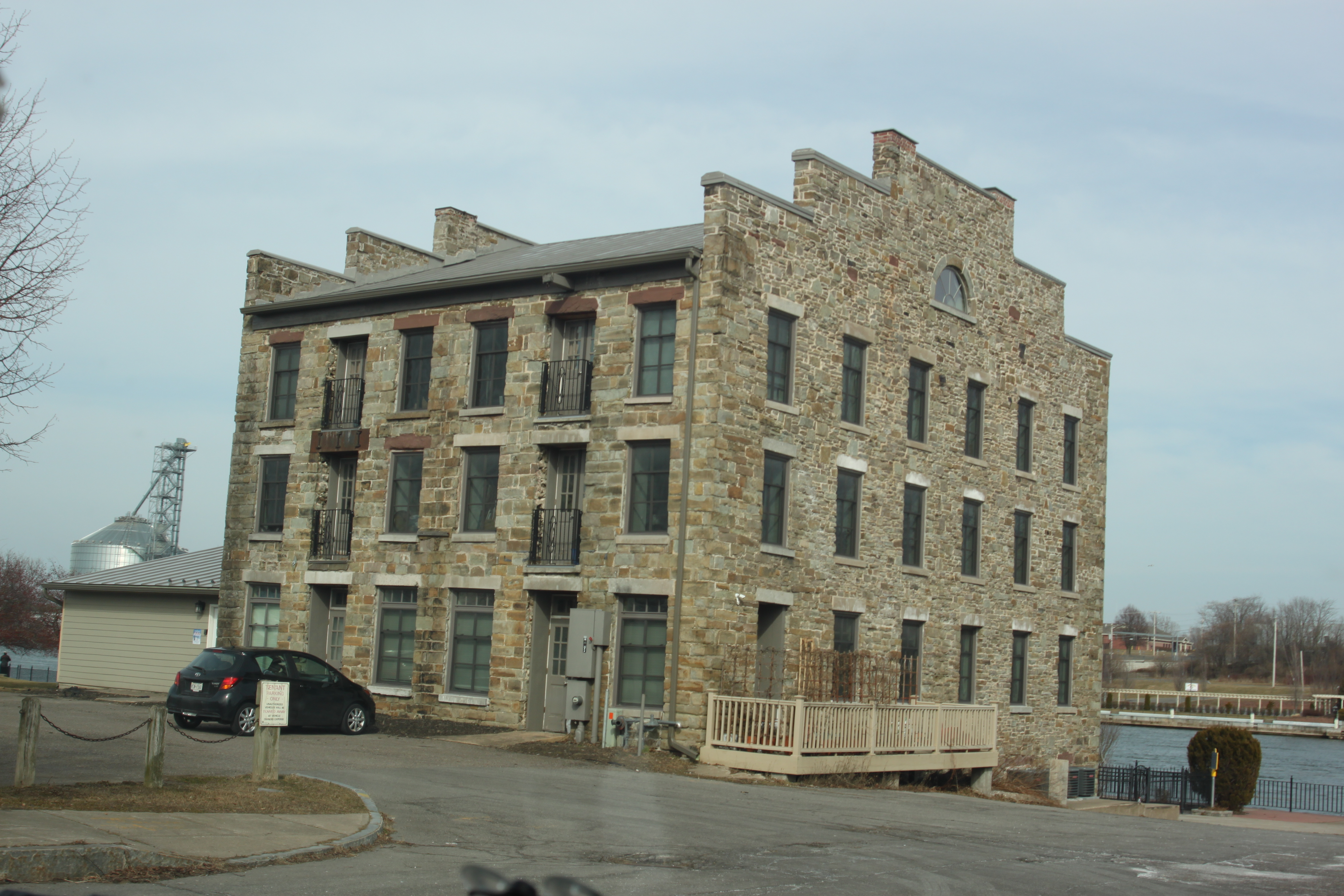
- Walton and Willet Store, February 2024

- Location within New York Location within the United States
- Location: 1 Seneca St., Oswego, New York
- Coordinates: 43°27′35″N 76°30′43″W
- Area: 1 acre (0.40 ha)
- Built: 1828
- NRHP reference No.: 76001263
- Added to NRHP: May 24, 1976

Walton and Willett Stone Store, also known as the Cahill Building or Cahill's Fish Market, is a historic commercial building located in Oswego, New York. It is a three and four story, limestone structure with a distinctive stepped gable roof on the banks of the Oswego River. The oldest commercial building in the city of Oswego, it was built in 1828 and first used as a ship chandlery. In later years, it housed a newspaper office, customs collector, steamboat ticket and freight office, and warehouse. In 1945, it was purchased for use as a fish market.

It was listed on the National Register of Historic Places in 1976. It was the site of Coleman's Irish Pub until 2008.

In June 2014, the building was ruled "dangerous" by city codes officers citing structural concerns. In 2018, it was redeveloped and opened as seven luxury apartments, now called Cahill Landing. In 2019 the building received the Preservation League of New York State's Excellence in Historic Preservation award.
