= Sandy Creek Historic District =

Historic district in New York, United States

- U.S. National Register of Historic Places
- U.S. Historic district
- Location within New York Location within the United States
- Location: Jct. of Lake Rd. and US 11, Sandy Creek, New York
- Coordinates: 43°38′39″N 76°5′10″W
- Area: 3.7 acres (1.5 ha)
- Architectural style: Greek Revival, Italianate
- MPS: Sandy Creek MRA
- NRHP reference No.: 88002208
- Added to NRHP: November 15, 1988

Sandy Creek Historic District is a national historic district located in the village of Sandy Creek in Oswego County, New York. The district includes 14 contributing buildings on 11 properties. It includes the cohesive intact collection of late 19th century and early 20th century buildings on Main Street and Harwood Drive.

It was listed on the National Register of Historic Places in 1988.
