= Brosemer Brewery =

- U.S. National Register of Historic Places
- Location within New York Location within the United States
- Location: 472 W. First St., Oswego, New York
- Coordinates: 43°26′45″N 76°30′11″W
- Area: less than one acre
- MPS: Historic and Architectural Resources of the City of Oswego, NY
- NRHP reference No.: 10000102
- Added to NRHP: March 29, 2010

Brosemer Brewery, also known as the Seaway Supply Building, is a historic brewery located at Oswego in Oswego County, New York. It was built in 1888 and is a four-story building measuring approximately 50 feet wide and 126 feet deep. It is a heavy timber post and beam and brick masonry structure on a limestone foundation. It ceased use as a brewery in the 1920s, after which it housed manufacturing and warehousing companies.

It was listed on the National Register of Historic Places in 2010.
