= Tanner Block =

Historic commercial building in New York, United States

- U.S. National Register of Historic Places
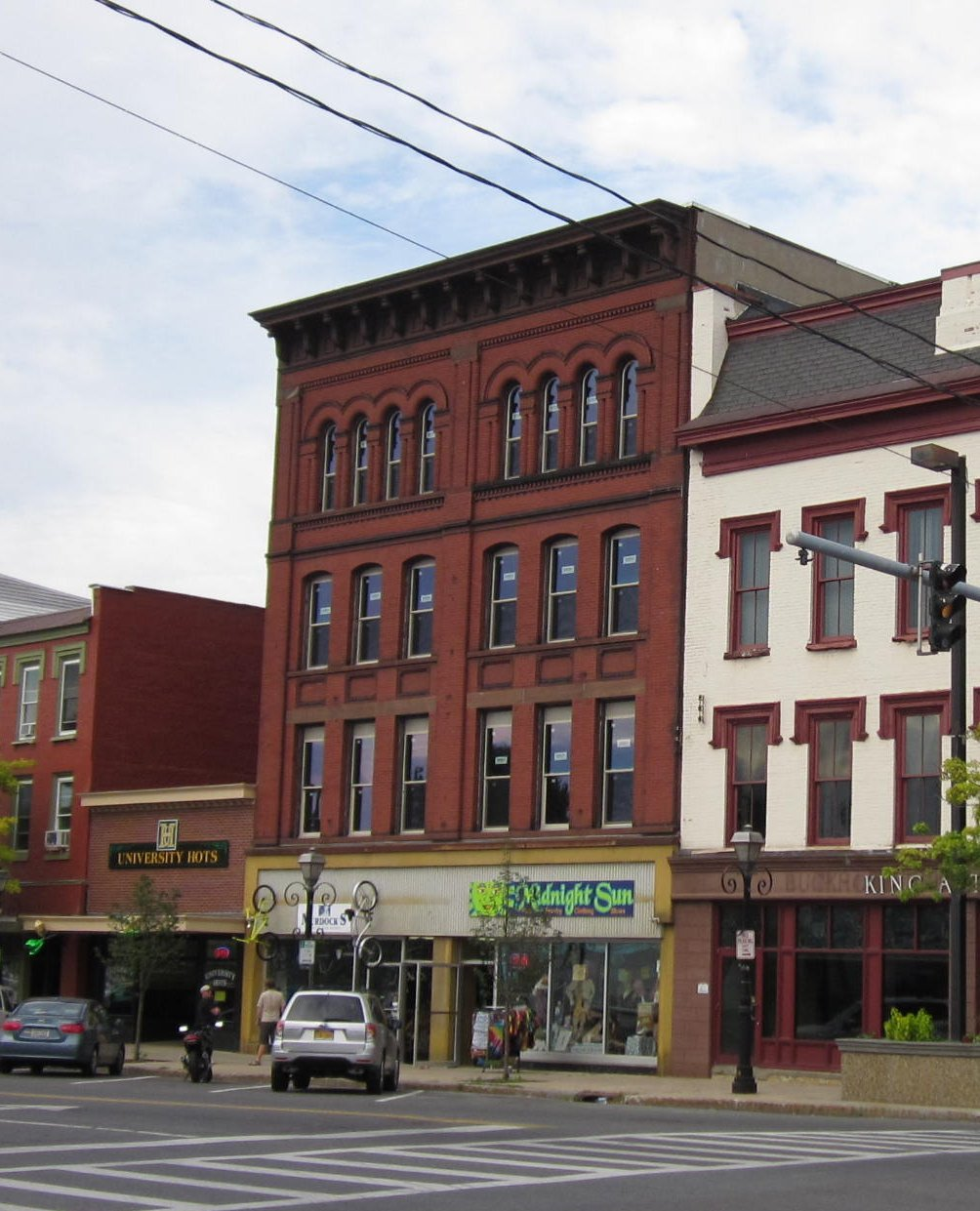
- Building in 2011

- Location within New York Location within the United States
- Location: 175-177 W. First St., Oswego, New York
- Coordinates: 43°27′24.92″N 76°30′41.2″W
- Area: 0.9 acres (0.36 ha)
- Built: 1890
- NRHP reference No.: 09001269
- Added to NRHP: December 25, 2009

Tanner Block is a historic commercial building located at Oswego in Oswego County, New York. It was built in 1890 and is a four-story brick structure constructed in an eclectic Victorian style. It measures 44 feet wide and 100 feet deep. It originally housed a hardware store. It was updated in 1926 to house a furniture store and again updated in the 1960s.

It was listed on the National Register of Historic Places in 2009.
