= Matthew Shoecraft House =

Historic house in New York, United States

- U.S. National Register of Historic Places
- Location within New York Location within the United States
- Location: Ridge Rd. at Smartville Rd., Lacona, New York
- Coordinates: 43°38′33″N 76°3′45″W
- Area: 2.5 acres (1.0 ha)
- Built: 1867
- Architectural style: Italianate
- MPS: Sandy Creek MRA
- NRHP reference No.: 88002210
- Added to NRHP: November 15, 1988

Matthew Shoecraft House is a historic home located at Lacona in Oswego County, New York. It was built about 1867 and is a two-story, five bay rectangular Italianate style clapboard residence with a shallow pitched hipped roof and a wide cornice with paired turned brackets.

It was listed on the National Register of Historic Places in 1988.
