= Newton M. Pitt House =

Historic house in New York, United States

- U.S. National Register of Historic Places
- Location within New York Location within the United States
- Location: 8114 Harwood Dr., Sandy Creek, New York
- Coordinates: 43°38′37″N 76°5′0″W
- Area: 2.7 acres (1.1 ha)
- Built: 1851
- Architect: Howlett, William E.
- Architectural style: Greek Revival
- MPS: Sandy Creek MRA
- NRHP reference No.: 88002209
- Added to NRHP: November 15, 1988

Newton M. Pitt House is a historic home located at Sandy Creek in Oswego County, New York. It was built in 1851 and is a two-story, frame Greek Revival style structure with an L-shaped plan, gable roof, and wide cornice.

It features a prominent pedimented portico supported by two square pillars and two columns with Ionic capitals.

It was listed on the National Register of Historic Places in 1989.
