= Sheldon Hall (Oswego, New York) =

- U.S. National Register of Historic Places
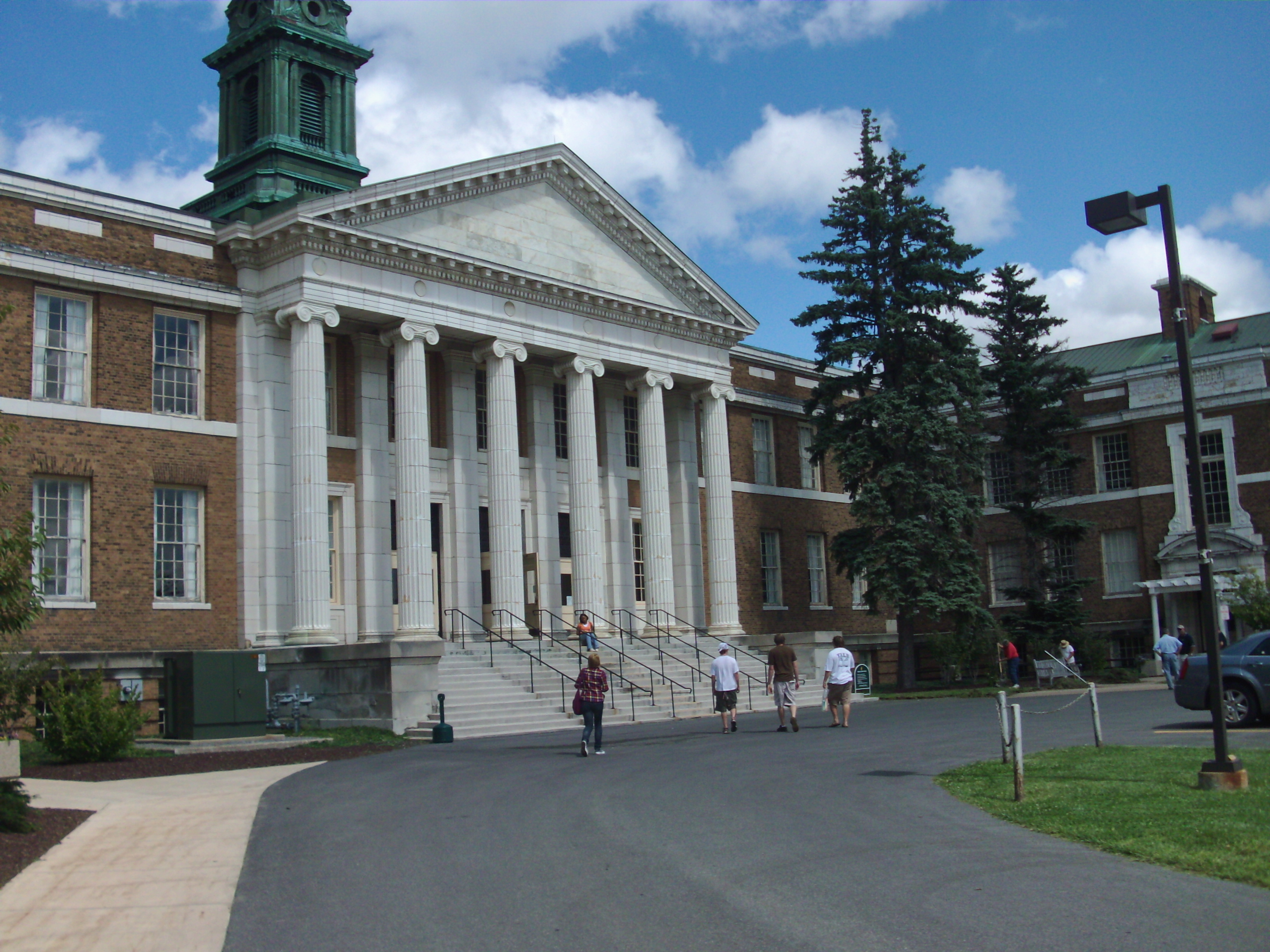
- Sheldon Hall - State University of New York at Oswego

- Location within New York Location within the United States
- Location: Washington Blvd., Oswego, New York
- Coordinates: 43°27′16″N 76°32′12″W
- Area: 6 acres (2.4 ha)
- Built: 1911
- Architect: NYS Dept. of Public Works
- Architectural style: Classical Revival
- NRHP reference No.: 80002741
- Added to NRHP: May 13, 1980

Sheldon Hall is a historic collegiate building located on the campus of the State University of New York at Oswego at Oswego in Oswego County, New York.

It was built in 1911 and is a Neoclassical style structure that consists of a two-story main block built of brick and terra cotta above a raised basement with flanking wings. It features a copper clad clock tower and belfry above a pediment on the main block.

It was listed on the National Register of Historic Places in 1980.
