= John B. and Lydia Edwards House =

Historic house in New York, United States

- U.S. National Register of Historic Places
- Location within New York Location within the United States
- Location: 144 E. Third St., Oswego, New York
- Coordinates: 43°27′17″N 76°30′16″W
- Area: less than one acre
- Built: 1834-35
- Architectural style: Greek Revival
- MPS: Freedom Trail, Abolitionism, and African American Life in Central New York MPS
- NRHP reference No.: 01001316
- Added to NRHP: December 04, 2001

John B. and Lydia Edwards House is a historic home located at Oswego in Oswego County, New York. It is a two-story, rectangular frame residence built between 1834 and 1835. Its owner John B. Edwards was abolitionist Gerrit Smith's agent at Oswego and the house is well documented as a way station on the Underground Railroad.

It was listed on the National Register of Historic Places in 2001.
