= Kingsford House =

Historic house in New York, United States

- U.S. National Register of Historic Places
- Location within New York Location within the United States
- Location: 150 W. Third St., Oswego, New York
- Coordinates: 43°27′16″N 76°30′47″W
- Area: less than one acre
- Built: 1870
- Architect: Francis, Thomas; Raby, Peter
- Architectural style: Tudor Revival, Late 19th And 20th Century Revivals
- NRHP reference No.: 97000951
- Added to NRHP: August 21, 1997

Kingsford House is a historic home located at Oswego in Oswego County, New York. It is a large 2 1/2-story brick residence. Built about 1870 in the Italianate style, it was extensively reconfigured and enlarged in 1912–1913 in the Tudor Revival style. Along the north and east edge of the property is a terrace wall built of cut limestone blocks and topped by a cast and wrought iron fence.

It was listed on the National Register of Historic Places in 1997.
