= Lacona station (New York) =

Historic train station in Oswego County, NY

Lacona
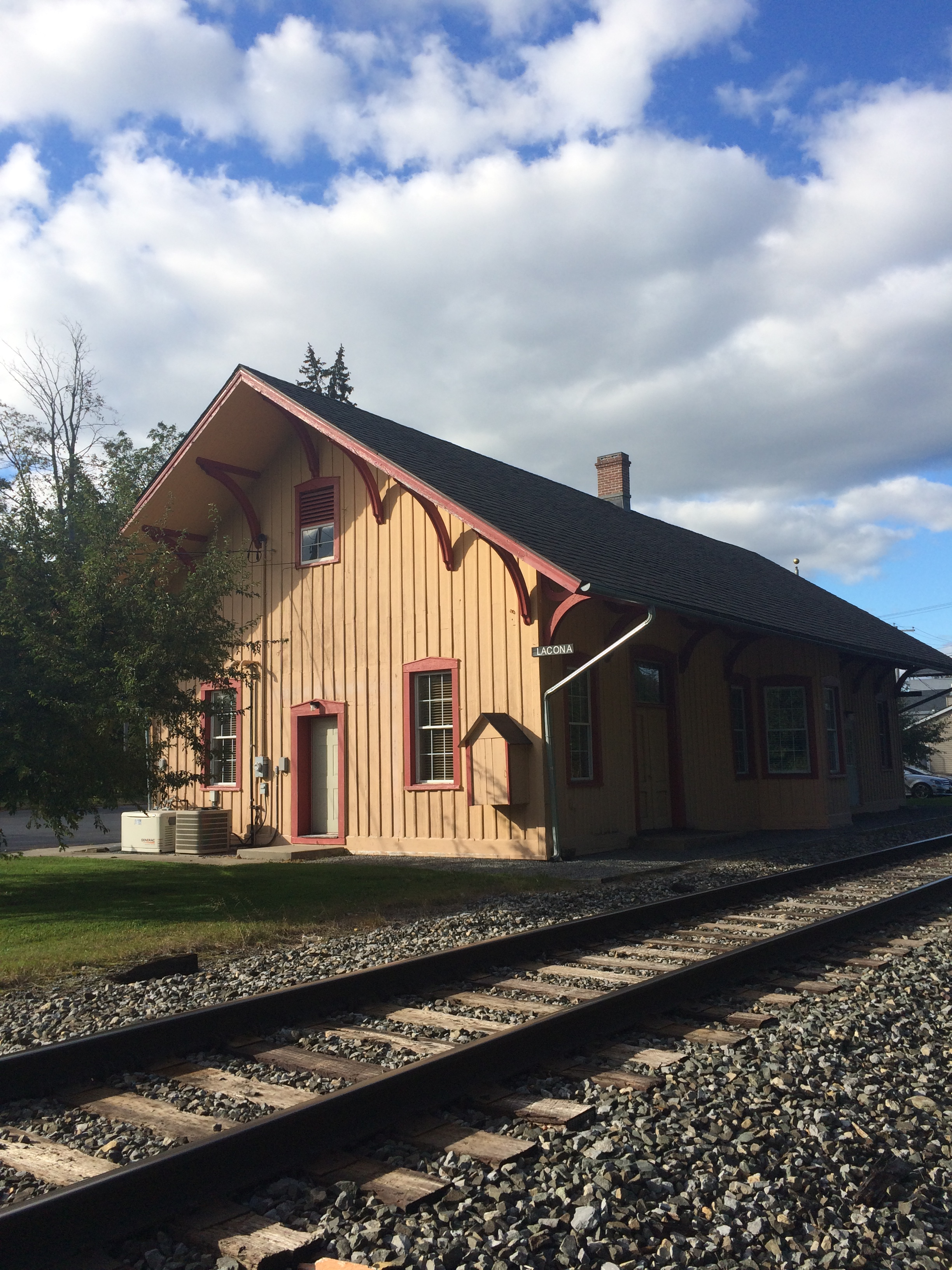

General information
- Location: 11 Park Avenue, Lacona, Oswego County, New York 13083

Services
Preceding station	New York Central Railroad	Following station
Richland toward Syracuse	Syracuse – Massena	Mannsville toward Massena
- Lacona Railroad Station and Depot
- U.S. National Register of Historic Places
- Location within New York Location within the United States
- Location: 11 Park Ave., Lacona, New York
- Coordinates: 43°38′34″N 76°4′13″W
- Area: less than one acre
- Built: 1891
- Architectural style: Late Victorian
- NRHP reference No.: 01001499
- Added to NRHP: January 24, 2002
Location

Lacona station, also known as New York Central and Hudson River Railroad Station and Depot, is a historic railway depot located at Lacona in Oswego County, New York. It was built in 1891 by the New York Central and Hudson River Railroad. It is a small rectangular, one story, gable ended structure.

It was listed on the National Register of Historic Places in 2002 as Lacona Railroad Station and Depot.
