= Sandy Creek (village), New York =

Sandy Creek, New York
- Village
- Location in Oswego County and the state of New York.
- Coordinates: 43°38′49″N 76°5′11″W
- Country: United States
- State: New York
- County: Oswego

Area
  - Total: 1.35 sq mi (3.49 km^{2})
  - Land: 1.35 sq mi (3.49 km^{2})
  - Water: 0 sq mi (0.00 km^{2})
- Elevation: 499 ft (152 m)

Population (2020)
  - Total: 646
  - Density: 478.9/sq mi (184.91/km^{2})
- Time zone: UTC-5 (Eastern (EST))
  - Summer (DST): UTC-4 (EDT)
- ZIP code: 13145
- Area code: 315
- FIPS code: 36-65068
- GNIS feature ID: 0964425
- Website: https://www.villageofsandycreek.com/

Sandy Creek is a village in Oswego County, New York, United States. The population was 771 at the 2010 census.

The Village of Sandy Creek in the central part of the Town of Sandy Creek. The village is located by U.S. Route 11.

== History ==
The historic core of the village was listed on the National Register of Historic Places in 1983 as the Sandy Creek Historic District. Also listed are the Methodist Church, First Baptist Church, Samuel Sadler House, and Newton M. Pitt House.

== Geography ==
Sandy Creek is located at 43°38′49″N 76°5′10″W (43.647037, -76.086305).

A stream called "Little Sandy Creek" flows past the north side of the village.

According to the United States Census Bureau, the village has a total area of 1.4 square miles (3.7 km^{2}), all land.

== Demographics ==
Historical population
Census	Pop.	Note	%±
1870	986		—
1880	951		−3.5%
1890	723		−24.0%
1900	692		−4.3%
1910	617		−10.8%
1920	566		−8.3%
1930	648		14.5%
1940	646		−0.3%
1950	708		9.6%
1960	697		−1.6%
1970	731		4.9%
1980	765		4.7%
1990	793		3.7%
2000	789		−0.5%
2010	771		−2.3%
2020	646		−16.2%
U.S. Decennial Census

As of the census of 2000, there were 789 people, 311 households, and 208 families residing in the village. The population density was 552.2 inhabitants per square mile (213.2/km^{2}). There were 338 housing units at an average density of 236.5 per square mile (91.3/km^{2}). The racial makeup of the village was 98.73% White, 0.51% Native American, 0.13% from other races, and 0.63% from two or more races. Hispanic or Latino of any race were 0.38% of the population.

There were 311 households, out of which 30.2% had children under the age of 18 living with them, 51.8% were married couples living together, 11.3% had a female householder with no husband present, and 32.8% were non-families. 26.4% of all households were made up of individuals, and 11.6% had someone living alone who was 65 years of age or older. The average household size was 2.54 and the average family size was 3.04.

In the village, the population was spread out, with 27.0% under the age of 18, 6.2% from 18 to 24, 28.6% from 25 to 44, 24.8% from 45 to 64, and 13.3% who were 65 years of age or older. The median age was 37 years. For every 100 females, there were 91.5 males. For every 100 females age 18 and over, there were 90.7 males.

The median income for a household in the village was $34,167, and the median income for a family was $47,188. Males had a median income of $35,417 versus $20,000 for females. The per capita income for the village was $17,297. About 12.8% of families and 17.5% of the population were below the poverty line, including 23.7% of those under age 18 and 18.9% of those age 65 or over.
