= First National Bank of Lacona =

Historic commercial building in New York, United States

- U.S. National Register of Historic Places
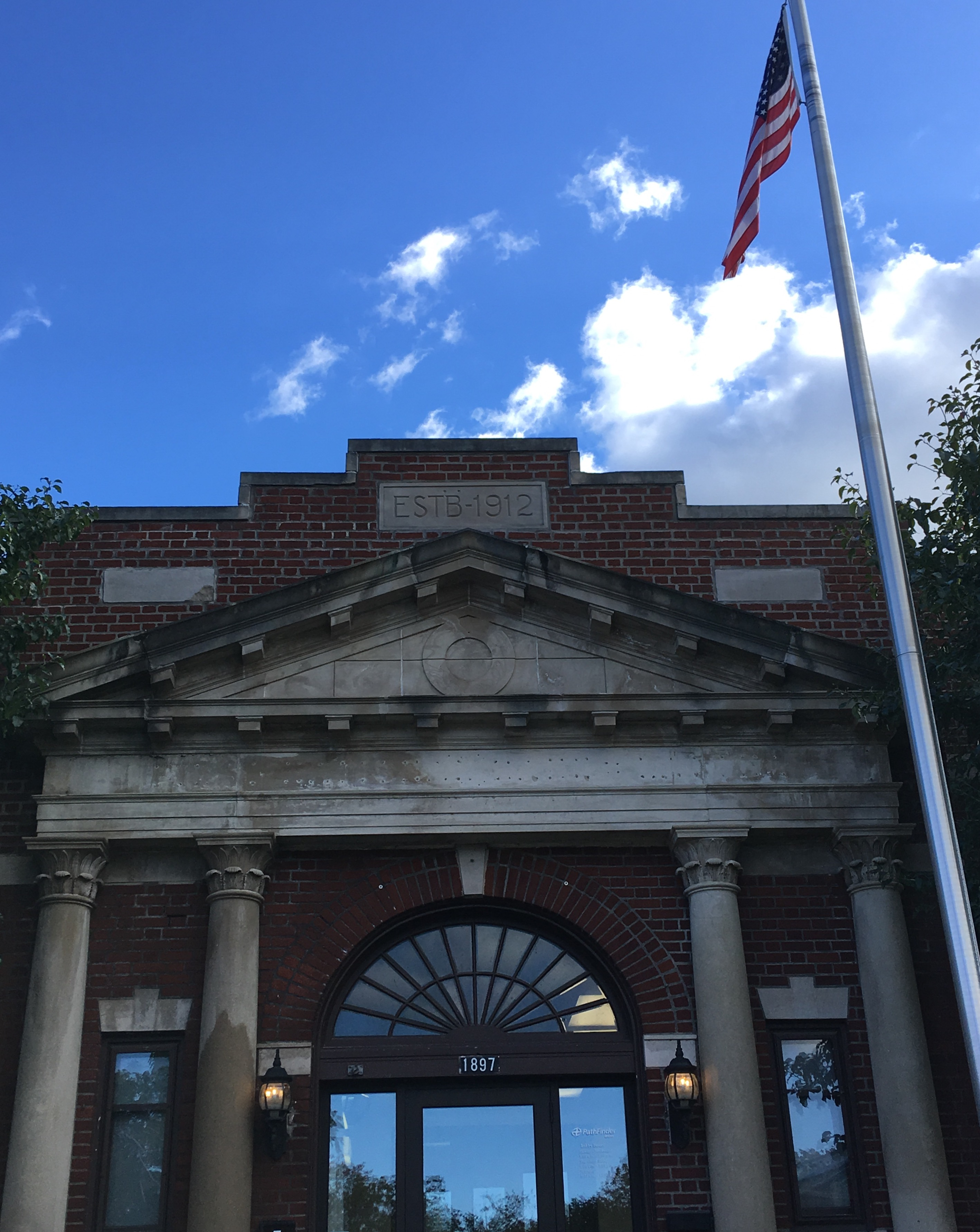
- Close-up view of the front door of the First National Bank of Laconia

- Location within New York Location within the United States
- Location: Harwood Dr. and Salina St., Lacona, New York
- Coordinates: 43°38′36″N 76°4′10″W
- Area: 0.3 acres (0.12 ha)
- Built: 1922
- Architectural style: Classical Revival
- MPS: Sandy Creek MRA
- NRHP reference No.: 88002219
- Added to NRHP: November 15, 1988

First National Bank of Lacona is a historic bank building located at Lacona in Oswego County, New York. It was built in 1922-1923 and is a one-story, brick commercial structure in the Neoclassical style. It is three bays wide and five bays long with a multi-stage parapet roof.

It was listed on the National Register of Historic Places in 1988. As of 2023, the bank building is a PathFinder Bank branch.
