= Oswego County Courthouse =

- U.S. National Register of Historic Places
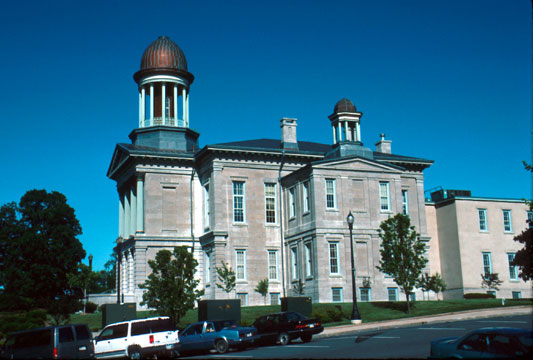
- Oswego County Courthouse, June 1993

- Location within New York Location within the United States
- Interactive map showing the location for Oswego County Courthouse
- Location: East Bridge St., Oswego, New York
- Coordinates: 43°27′26″N 76°30′22″W
- Area: less than one acre
- Built: 1859
- Architect: White, Horatio Nelson; Smith & Ratigan et al.
- Architectural style: Early Renaissance Revival
- NRHP reference No.: 00001418
- Added to NRHP: December 07, 2000

Oswego County Courthouse is a historic courthouse located at Oswego in Oswego County, New York. It was built in 1859-1860 and altered in 1891 and again in 1962. The two story building rises above a cruciform plan and is constructed of load bearing masonry walls faced with smooth ashlar limestone. It features a portico surmounted by a domed cupola. It was designed by architect Horatio Nelson White (1814–1892).

It was listed on the National Register of Historic Places in 2000.
