= George B. Sloan Estate =

Historic house in New York, United States

- U.S. National Register of Historic Places
- Location within New York Location within the United States
- Location: 107 W. Van Buren St., Oswego, New York
- Coordinates: 43°27′35″N 76°31′17″W
- Area: 1.4 acres (0.57 ha)
- Architectural style: Italian Villa
- NRHP reference No.: 88001237
- Added to NRHP: August 11, 1988

George B. Sloan Estate is a historic home located at Oswego in Oswego County, New York. It is a 2 1/2-story, irregularly massed, Ithaca limestone building built between 1866 and 1870 in the Italian Villa style. It features a square, 3-story engaged tower. Also on the property is a carriage house, cast-iron fence, and fountain.

It was listed on the National Register of Historic Places in 1988.
