= Richardson-Bates House =

Historic house in New York, United States

- Richardson-Bates House Museum
- U.S. National Register of Historic Places
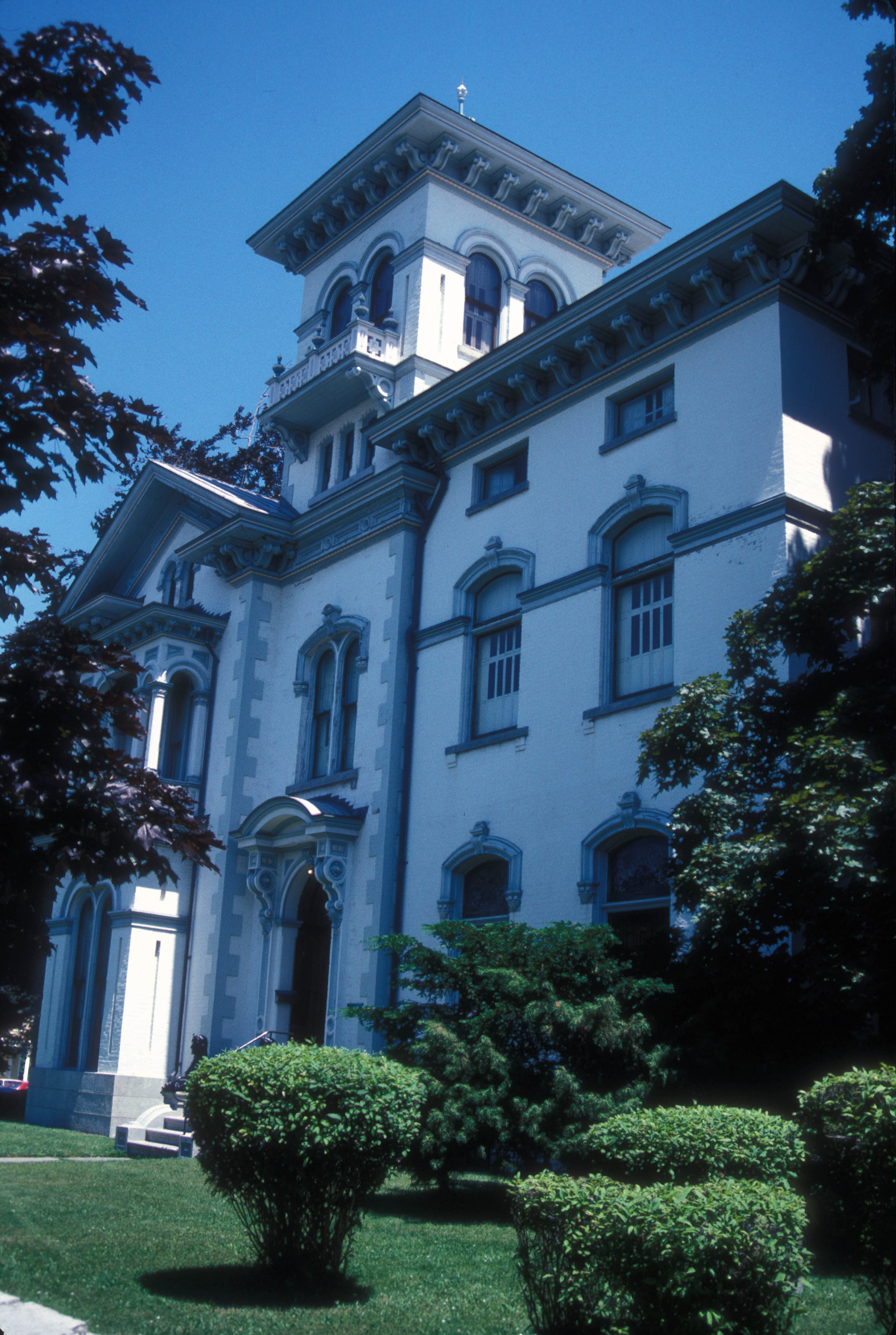

- Location within New York Location within the United States
- Location: 135 E. 3rd St., Oswego, New York
- Coordinates: 43°27′21″N 76°30′16″W
- Area: 1 acre (0.40 ha)
- Built: 1867; 159 years ago
- Architect: Warner, A.J.; Lavonier, Louis
- NRHP reference No.: 75001220
- Added to NRHP: September 5, 1975

The Richardson-Bates House Museum is a historic home located at Oswego in Oswego County, New York. It is constructed primarily of brick and built in two stages. The main section is a 2 1/2-story, Tuscan Villa style brick residence with a gable roof and 4-story tower designed by architect Andrew Jackson Warner about 1867. The interior features carved woodwork by Louis Lavonier. The South wing addition included a private library, formal dining room and kitchen that was completed in 1889.

The house and its contents were donated to the Oswego Historical Society in 1947. It was listed on the National Register of Historic Places in 1975.
