= Mexico, New York =

Town in New York, United States

Mexico
- Town
- logo

- Location in Oswego County and the state of New York.
- Coordinates: 43°27′21″N 076°12′20″W
- Country: United States
- State: New York
- County: Oswego

Government
  - Town Supervisor: Eric Behling

Area
  - Total: 46.99 sq mi (121.70 km^{2})
  - Land: 46.27 sq mi (119.84 km^{2})
  - Water: 0.72 sq mi (1.86 km^{2})
- Elevation: 397 ft (121 m)

Population (2020)
  - Total: 5,257
  - Density: 110.4/sq mi (42.61/km^{2})
- Time zone: UTC-5 (Eastern (EST))
  - Summer (DST): UTC-4 (EDT)
- FIPS code: 36-46822
- GNIS feature ID: 979211
- Website: townofmexicony.gov

Mexico is a town in the northeastern section of Oswego County, New York, United States. The population was 5,257 at the 2020 census. The town contains a village also named Mexico.

Mexico has been referred to as the "Mother of Towns", as the original town as enacted by separate acts of 1792 and 1796 comprised an area that would eventually form six separate counties (Onondaga, Cortland, Oneida, Lewis, Jefferson, and Oswego). These six counties today contain a total of 84 separate towns that were once included in the original Town of Mexico.

NY 69 comes to an end in the village of Mexico, where it intersects with NY 104 (Main Street). U.S. Route 11 also passes through the town.

== History ==
The first Mexico (a proposed county), with all the surrounding towns, was originally created from Town of Whitestown, Oneida County, New York, on April 10, 1792, by the State Land Commissioner. It was to include present day Oswego and Jefferson Counties. The original organization of the proposed Mexico County and a town of that name was abandoned for a time. In December 1794, George Frederick William Augustus Scriba purchased and patented a large tract of land; subsequently becoming a second Mexico, hence the Village of Mexico and the Town of Mexico.

George Scriba also later opened roads traveling from Mexico Bay and Mexico Point from what is now Mexico Point State Park to present-day Constantia, as well as a highway to present-day Oswego.

Settlers grew quickly in both the Town and Village of Mexico. The presence of roads, log cabins, frame houses, and businesses encouraged growth. Mexico's early businesses included saw mills, oil-mills, gristmills, asheries, tanneries, blacksmiths, tinsmiths, coopers, cheese plants, cloth-dressings, distilleries, shoe-shops, hotels, general merchandise, and jewelers.

Lewis Miller invented the spring wagon and the high quality of these wagons made them famous all over the county.

Lulu Brown began making pans of baked beans to sell in grocery stores in 1937. They sold so well that her husband Earl and her son Robert E. Brown decided to sell them in Oswego. The business grew and relocated to the second story of the building at the south east corner of South Jefferson and Main Streets. Earl Brown died in 1938 and shortly after Richard G. Whitney joined the firm, forming Brown-Whitney-Brown (BWB). The business has since evolved into the world-famous Grandma Brown's Baked Beans.

With growth, disease was prevalent. Between 1812 and 1820 a cholera-like disease spread throughout the region, a fatal form of dysentery, as well as ague and bilious fevers. More than one-half of the settlers died of these scourges during the first 20 years of the settlement.

In 1813 a system of public schools was established with 14 districts. The number increased to 19 by 1895 as new settlements developed. In 1822 a two-story brick school housing grades on the first floor and high school on the second. This was called "The Academy" and was admitted to the state system by the regents in 1833. Mexico was the first school of secondary education to be founded in what is now Oswego County. Mexico was the first school to centralize in Oswego county. This occurred in 1936 when 31 districts in the towns of Mexico, Palermo and New Haven closed to make Mexico Academy and Central School. An elementary school continued in New Haven and Palermo while the rest of the students were bussed to Mexico.

Mexico also played its part in the abolition of slavery. As early as 1835 citizens signed petitions which were sent to Washington requesting the abolishment of slavery. Asa Wing was a prominent speaker who traveled across the state urging voters to pressure their representatives to pass new laws prohibiting ownership of slaves. Starr Clark was leader in the Underground Railroad and was the station master of the area.

The Stillman Farmstead, Slack Farmstead, and Asa and Caroline Wing House are listed on the National Register of Historic Places.

== Education ==
The school district is known as the Mexico Academy and Central School District (MACS). The sports program's mascot is the Tiger, and the music program's mascot is the Matador. The High School Building was once the site of Mexico Academy, a military academy, from which the school district took its name. The district's bus garage is located on State Route 104, next to the middle school. Schools included in the district are:

- Mexico High School
- Mexico Middle School
- Mexico Elementary School
- New Haven Elementary School
- Palermo Elementary School

== Geography ==
According to the United States Census Bureau, the town has a total area of 47.0 square miles (121.7 km^{2}), of which 46.3 square miles (120.0 km^{2}) is land and 0.6 square mile (1.6 km^{2}) (1.34%) is water. The northwest part of the town borders Lake Ontario.

== Demographics ==
Historical population
Census	Pop.	Note	%±
1820	2,728		—
1830	2,671		−2.1%
1840	3,729		39.6%
1850	4,221		13.2%
1860	4,074		−3.5%
1870	3,802		−6.7%
1880	3,687		−3.0%
1890	3,404		−7.7%
1900	3,091		−9.2%
1910	2,982		−3.5%
1920	2,824		−5.3%
1930	2,720		−3.7%
1940	2,710		−0.4%
1950	3,035		12.0%
1960	3,435		13.2%
1970	4,174		21.5%
1980	4,790		14.8%
1990	5,050		5.4%
2000	5,181		2.6%
2010	5,197		0.3%
2020	5,257		1.2%
U.S. Decennial Census

As of the census in the year 2000, there were 5,181 people, 1,934 households, and 1,388 families residing in the town. The population density was 111.8 inhabitants per square mile (43.2/km^{2}). There were 2,211 housing units at an average density of 47.7 per square mile (18.4/km^{2}). The racial makeup of the town was 98.15% White, 0.17% Black or African American, 0.44% Native American, 0.21% Asian, 0.02% Pacific Islander, 0.19% from other races, and 0.81% from two or more races. Hispanic or Latino of any race were 0.68% of the population.

There were 1,934 households, out of which 38.2% had children under the age of 18 living with them, 56.6% were married couples living together, 10.1% had a female householder with no husband present, and 28.2% were non-families. 22.4% of all households were made up of individuals, and 9.3% had someone living alone who was 65 years of age or older. The average household size was 2.67 and the average family size was 3.13.

In the town, the population was spread out, with 29.4% under the age of 18, 6.8% from 18 to 24, 29.6% from 25 to 44, 24.3% from 45 to 64, and 9.9% who were 65 years of age or older. The median age was 36 years. For every 100 females, there were 99.6 males. For every 100 females age 18 and over, there were 96.7 males.

The median income for a household in the town was $42,773, and the median income for a family was $46,852. Males had a median income of $38,250 versus $22,183 for females. The per capita income for the town was $17,498. About 9.0% of families and 11.9% of the population were below the poverty line, including 15.9% of those under age 18 and 10.1% of those age 65 or over.

== Sister cities ==
- Schneverdingen, Germany
- Garden City, New York
