= Hensel =

Hensel may refer to:

== People ==
- Kaden Hensel (born 1986), inactive Australian tennis player
- Robert M. Hensel (born 1969), Guinness World Records holder for the longest non-stop wheelie in a wheelchair
- Witold Hensel (1917–2008), Polish archaeologist

=== Germany ===
- Albert Hensel (1895–1942), German Communist executed under the Nazis
- Alfred Hensel (1880–1969), German architect and director of the Nuremberg parks department
- Daniel Hensel (born 1978), German composer, VJ, musicologist and music theorist
- Fanny Hensel (1805–1847), German pianist and composer
- Friederike Sophie Seyler (née Hensel; 1737/1738 – 1789), German actress, playwright and librettist
- Gottfried Hensel (1687–1765), German linguist
- Gustav Hensel (1884–1933), German international footballer
- Julius Hensel (1833 – c. 1903), German agricultural and physiological chemist or pharmacist
- Kurt Hensel (1861–1941), German mathematician
- Luise Hensel (1798–1876), German religious author and poet
- Marc Hensel (born 1986), German retired footballer
- Paul Hensel (1860–1930), German philosopher
- Paul Hensel (politician) (1867-1944), German Lutheran theologian and politician
- Wilhelm Hensel (1794–1861), German painter

=== United States ===
- Abby and Brittany Hensel (born 1990), American dicephalic parapagus twins
- Donald Hensel (1926-2020), American politician
- H. Struve Hensel (1901–1991), American international lawyer
- Karen Hensel, American actress
- Nancy H. Hensel (born 1943), American academic and university administrator
- W. U. Hensel (1851–1915), Pennsylvania newspaper editor, lawyer, author, and state Attorney General
- Wendy Hensel, American legal scholar and academic administrator

== Other ==
- Canton City, North Dakota (also Hensel, ND), a town located on the east edge of Park Township in Pembina County, North Dakota, United States
- Hensel Formation, a Mesozoic geologic formation in Texas
- Hensel Phelps Construction, one of the largest general contractors and construction managers in the United States
- Hensel's lemma, a result in modular arithmetic
- Hensel's snake (Ditaxodon taeniatus), a snake endemic to southern Brazil
- Henselian ring (also Hensel ring), a local ring in which Hensel's lemma holds
- Microtus henseli (also Hensel's vole), a rodent found in Sardinia and Corsica
