= Lois E. Trott =

American educator, philanthropist (1828 – 1894)

- Born: Lois E. Andrews; January 4, 1828 near Oswego, New York, U.S.
- Died: October 4, 1894 (aged 66); Mount Vernon, Texas, U.S.
- Occupations: Educator, philanthropist
- Spouse: Eli Trott
- Children: 2

Lois E. Trott (née Andrews; January 4, 1828 – October 4, 1894) was an American educator and philanthropist born near Oswego, New York. Known for her innovative teaching methods and dedication to improving the lives of impoverished children, she made significant contributions to education and social welfare. She was notably involved with the Five Points House of Industry and the Children's Aid Society, and later became active in the Woman's Christian Temperance Union.

== Biography ==
=== Early life and education ===
Lois E. Andrews was born near Oswego, New York. Her father was a pioneer farmer who lived far from schools, which made accessing education challenging. At the age of three, Lois began attending a school two miles away. By the age of fifteen, she started her career as a teacher, earning a reputation for introducing new educational methods. In 1851, she became a pupil at the State Normal School of Albany. She left her studies to teach in Oswego.

=== Children's Aid Society ===
After several years in home missionary work, Lois married Eli Trott, who worked in the same field. The couple dedicated their efforts to the Children's Aid Society. Lois Trott took charge of the first lodging-house for homeless girls in America, located at 205 New Canal Street. This institution aimed to provide a decent bed and a satisfactory meal for girls who were either unsuccessful in finding work or were street vendors.

The lodging-house, under Lois Trott's supervision, became a refuge for many young girls. It was designed to be self-supporting by charging a nominal fee to the lodgers, which helped the girls develop a sense of responsibility and avoid a mindset of dependency. The facility also provided education in practical skills. Girls were taught sewing and housekeeping under Mrs. Trott's guidance, forming an evening circle of sewers.

Additionally, the lodging-house extended its services to young street workers, such as crossing-sweepers, encouraging them to abandon their half-begging avocations for more respectable pursuits. The institution also served as a temporary home for children from difficult backgrounds, such as those with alcoholic parents. Despite being a newly established facility, the lodging-house quickly reached capacity. The top floors of the building, initially used for business purposes, were transformed into dormitories, a large reception room, and educational spaces.

Lois Trott managed the home without any remuneration. The home accommodated between one thousand to twelve hundred girls annually, many of whom went on to lead successful and productive lives. In 1872, Lois Trott left the position to focus on her family and the education of her children.

=== Chautauqua movement ===
Trott was a participant in the Chautauqua movement, a national education and social reform movement. She became an alumna of the Chautauqua institution and attended many of its national conventions. She initiated a reading class for domestic workers in her village, an undertaking aimed at providing education to kitchen workers.

=== Death ===
Lois E. Trott died on October 4, 1894, in Mount Vernon, Texas. The New York Times described her as "one of the most prominent workers in the Woman's Christian Temperance Union", and "one of that organization's most eloquent and earnest speakers."

== Sources ==
- Moulton, Charles (1893). Willard, Frances E.; Livermore, Mary A. (eds.). Woman of the Century: Fourteen Hundred-Seventy Biographical Sketches Accompanied by Portraits of Leading American Women in All Walks of Life. Buffalo, Chicago, New York: Charles Wells Moulton. pp. 722–723.
