= Paddy Doyle =

Paddy Doyle may refer to:

- Paddy Doyle (athlete), English endurance athlete
- Paddy Doyle (Tipperary hurler) (1941–2020), Irish hurler
- Paddy Doyle (Dublin hurler) (born 2003), Irish hurler
