= Nettie Leila Michel =

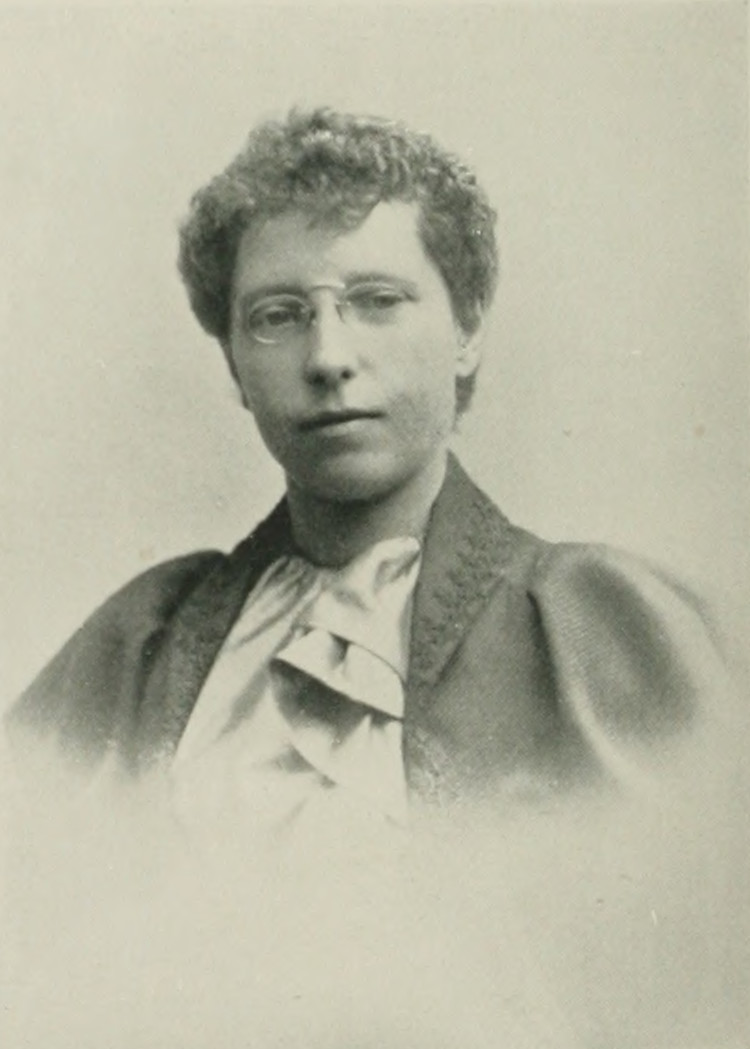
- Photo in A Woman of the Century
- Born: Jeannette Leila Champion; September 26, 1863; Oswego, New York, U.S.
- Died: June 29, 1912 (aged 49); Brooklyn, New York, U.S.
- Resting place: Oswego
- Other name: Nettie
- Occupations: business woman; commercial traveler; author; magazine editor
- Spouses: Mr. Michel (m. 1882; div. 1882) Sidney H. Smith (m. 1893; died 1903) Elijah Lee Roake (m. 1904)

Nettie Leila Michel (née, Champion; after first marriage, Michel; after second marriage, Smith; after third marriage, Jeannette Champion Roake; September 26, 1863 – June 29, 1912) was an American business woman, author, and magazine editor of the long nineteenth century. Michel was the first woman commercial traveler (traveling salesperson) in the U.S. and early in life traveled through Michigan for the N. K. Fairbank Company, of Chicago. She later gave up traveling and became the first editor of a strictly literary magazine, being associated with Charles Wells Moulton in Buffalo, New York, on The Magazine of Poetry, and with Mary Livermore in literary work.

== Early life and education ==
Jeannette (nickname, "Nettie") Leila Champion was born in Oswego, New York, September 26, 1863.

She was descended from several of the most prominent early Colonial families, and was a lineal descendant of Joseph Jenckes Jr., who founded Pawtucket, Rhode Island, and from Joseph Jenckes, his son, who for twenty years, was governor of the Colony of Rhode Island and Providence Plantations. Her great-grandfather, Samuel Tefft, was a member of the Rhode Island General Assembly that on May 4, 1776, two months before the Declaration of Independence, voted to sever all political relationships with the home country of Great Britain. Her father was Mortimer A. Champion, who was a lineal descendant of Henry Champion, one of the early settlers of the Connecticut Valley and whose son, Mehitable, carried despatches for George Washington's army. Michel's mother was Cecelia Penny Champion, a descendant of the Clark family, of central New York.

Michel received her early education in the public schools of Syracuse, New York, and later in the public schools of Oswego.

== Career ==
She married Mr. Michel, March 29, 1882, but the marriage lasted for less than one year. Being obliged to support herself, she went out as an advertising agent for a large wholesale house of Chicago, Illinois, and was the first woman in the U.S. to fill such a position. She then became a "drummer" (traveling commercial salesman), visiting the drug trade in the interests of an Eastern supply house. She was one of the first, if not the first, women sent out as an agent for staple articles, traveling from place to place with her trunk of samples. Her territory includes the States of New York, New Jersey, Pennsylvania, and Michigan. As a drummer, she was very successful, but left the road at the end of two years. She then took a course in stenography in Prof. Augustus J. Warner's Elmira Business and Shorthand College in Elmira, New York, in 1888, and was graduated in three months, one of the best qualified students sent out by that school during a term of 25 years.

In the fall of 1888, she entered the office of The Magazine of Poetry in Buffalo, New York, and took charge of the correspondence as an expert stenographer. The following year, she became the business manager of the magazine, a position she resigned in 1891 to become its editor (through 1896). She also wrote prose articles and biographies for it. She was intimately acquainted with the prominent poets and writers of her day.

Michel was interested in all movements for the advancement of women, and she represented business interests in various conventions throughout the country.

== Personal life ==
Michel was a member of the Woman's National Press Association of Washington, D.C., and the King's Daughters. She was a communicant of St. John's Episcopal Church, Buffalo, as well as an Episcopal Church in Philadelphia, Pennsylvania.

Michel owned the homestead on Tug Hill, west of Peekskill, New York, the house on which was built from logs cut on the farm in the early 1850s. She had been ill for several years in later life. She died at the Seney Hospital in Brooklyn, New York, following an operation for appendicitis on June 29, 1912. Her husband, Elijah Lee Roake (1867–1921), accompanied Michel's body to Oswego, New York, for the funeral, with interment at that city's Rural Cemetery. Michel was also survived by a half-brother, Adelbert Foster, and a half-sister, Ella Skineer; George Wilson and his mother, Emmery, who live on the old homestead on Tug Hill; Mrs. Lena Helig; and Mrs. Thomas B. Gates.
