= Robert Natoli =

American businessman and writer

Robert Natoli was an American author and businessman. He holds a number of Guinness World Records.

== Personal life ==
Natoli is from Oswego, New York. He graduated from Oswego High School. For college, he attended State University of New York at Oswego and graduated with a degree in Communications in 1980. He is married to Peggy Natoli and has two children. He was a deacon at Oswego Alliance Church.

== Professional life ==
Business wise, Natoli used to own Rentavision. Rentavision rented furniture and household items. In 1999, the company was acquired by Rent-Way Inc. They acquired Rentavision for $92 million in cash. They also took on the debt and stock holdings of $6 million. As owner of Rentavision, Natoli was awarded the Ernst & Young, Entrepreneur of the Year Award.

As a Success Coach, Natoli has been featured in The Huffington Post. Natoli is the author of True Vision 4 Success, a book that focuses on what Natoli has done to achieve professional and personal success through thinking.

== Guinness World Records ==
Natoli has broken twelve Guinness World Record strongman records, including three in a nine-month period. Natoli broke the record for "most weight arm-curled in one hour," in May 2011, he lifted a total of 60,019 pounds. In October, 2011, he broke the world record for "most weight lifted by front dumbbell raises in one hour." He lifted 39,720 pounds, totaling 1,986 repetitions. In 2012, on Groundhog Day, he broke the world record for "most weight lifted by barbell rows in one hour," by lifting a 40-pound barbell for one hour a total of 1,360 times for an aggregate total of 51,640 pounds. He broke the previous record by 10,887.5 pounds, as held by Eamonn Keane. On April 4, 2013 he consecutively broke two Guinness World Records. The first, "Most Step-ups in One Minute with a 40-lb Pack" (52), then "Most Step-ups in One Minute with a 60-lb Pack" (47), breaking both Guinness World Records previously held by Paddy Doyle from the United Kingdom. On March 22, 2014, he consecutively broke three world records. The first, "Most Step-ups in One Minute with an 80-lb Pack" (41), followed by, "Most Step-ups in One Minute with a 100-lb Pack" (38), breaking both Guinness World Records previously held by Paddy Doyle from the United Kingdom, ending with, "Most Weight Lifted by Dumbbell Rows in One Minute (Using One Arm)," lifting an aggregate total of 4,356 pounds, breaking the previous record of 3,125.5 pounds, as held by Eamonn Keane. He uses these events to raise money for charities in the Syracuse, New York region. On October 14, 2017 Bob Natoli received his 12th Guinness Record by completing 48 squats while carrying a 60lb pack, besting the record previously held by Silvio Sabba of Italy. On December 15, 2022 Bob Natoli received his 13th Guinness Record for "most weight lifted by dumbbell curls in one hour". Bob set a brand new record and curled 35, 547 pounds.

| Record Title | Date Broken | Amount |
|---|---|---|
| Most Chin-ups in One Minute | February 4, 2006 | 40 |
| Most Chin-ups in One Minute | February 10, 2007 | 44 |
| Most Squat Thrusts in One Minute | February 10, 2007 | 56 |
| Most Weight Arm-Curled in One Hour | May 12, 2011 | 27,224.16 kg (60,019 lb) |
| Most weight lifted by front dumbbell raises in one hour] | October 27, 2011 | 18,016.69 kg (39,720 lb) |
| Most weight lifted by barbell rows in one hour] | February 2, 2012 | 23,423.51 kg (51,640 lb) |
| Most Step-ups in One Minute with a 40-lb Pack | April 4, 2013 | 52 |
| Most Step-ups in One Minute with a 60-lb Pack | April 4, 2013 | 47 |
| Most Step-ups in One Minute with an 80-lb Pack | March 22, 2014 | 41 |
| Most Step-ups in One Minute with a 100-lb Pack | March 22, 2014 | 38 |
| Most Weight Lifted by Dumbbell Rows in One Minute (Using Only One Arm) | March 22, 2014 | 1,975.85 kg (4,356 lb) |
| Most Squats in one minute while carrying a 60-lb pack | October 14, 2017 | 48 |
| Most Weight Lifted by Dumbbell Curls in One Hour | December 15, 2022 | 35,547 pounds |

== Bibliography ==
- Natoli, Robert. True Vision for 4 Success. Oswego: Bob Natoli Achievement Systems, Inc. (2011). ISBN 0982876904
