= Mick Fabar =

Australian businessman, builder and sportsman

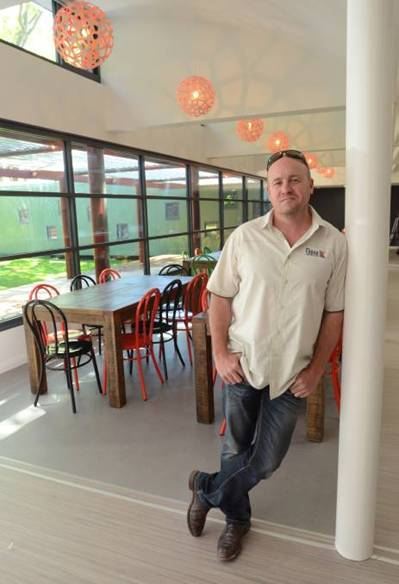
- Born: Michael John Fabar; Orange, New South Wales
- Occupation: CEO & Entrepreneur
- Known for: Founding of Green Homes Australia; Founding of Green Homes NZ; Founding of GH Builders USA; Guinness World Records; Charity Works
- Website: LinkedIn profile

Michael "Mick" John Fabar is an Australian businessman, builder, sportsman, and Guinness World Records holder. He is best known for his work as a green buildings specialist. As an athlete, he has twice held the world record for most punches in one minute, as well as breaking the world record for most hits on a speedball in one minute. Fabar is also the builder of ZeroD, the first sustainable, carbon-neutral car.

== Business career ==
Fabar is known for his work as a green buildings specialist. In 2001 he founded Mick Fabar Construction in Orange. Within five years, he received an excellence award for a redevelopment project from the Master Builders Association. Fabar later founded Green Homes Australia, a company that provides affordable and energy efficient homes.

In 2008, Fabar constructed two environmentally friendly houses in his hometown, showcasing his new construction approach with Green Homes Australia. In 2009, Fabar was a finalist in the Housing Industry Association awards in two categories: GreenSmart Builder of the Year and National Home of the Year, winning the HIA National awards for Water Efficiency 2008 and Energy Efficiency 2009.

Fabar developed a franchise model for Green Homes Australia, allowing builders to have access to the company's knowledge and resources and business model which has now been launched internationally under the banner of Green Homes New Zealand and has since launched GH Builders USA in the United States in 2017. Since that time Mick Fabar has been approached internationally by parties in Europe, the United States and Asia to further grow the Green Homes brand. The company certified its energy management system against ISO 50001 in 2014 and it remained the only Australian building company to have the certificate as of August 2015.

In January 2020, Fabar and the Green Homes team received an international Award in Global Innovation from the National Association of Home Builders in Las Vegas, NV. Following this victory, in February 2023, Fabar and the Green Homes team were awarded the highest award for Global Home of the Year for their home built in Perth, Australia, also an award winning home, being labeled as the Highest NATHERs Rated, Most Sustainable, Two-Storey Home in Australia.

== Sports career ==
=== Guinness World Records ===
Fabar broke the Guinness Record for most punches in one minute on multiple occasions and set a total of 7 new world speed boxing records during his career. The first was on 19 November 2005, when he took the world record with 436 punches. The world record was taken Englishman Paddy Doyle, with Fabar regained the world record in 2006 at an event organized in Sydney Football Stadium, achieving 548 punches in one minute. Fabar also became the holder of the Guinness Record for most left jabs thrown in 60 seconds, taking the world record with 302 in a live televised event shown nationally on Channel 9 in 2011. As of 2015 he also holds the Guinness Record for most hits on a speedball in one minute, a feat he achieved in 2008 with 447 achieved at Sydney University.

Fabar played rugby league at regional representative level as a youth until a knee injury forced him out of the sport at age 17. He also had a career in amateur and professional boxing where he was coached by John Robinson, a former coach for the Australian Boxing Team.Fabar made his professional debut for Australia / Sky Channel / FightVision, on 26 November 1993 on the Australia vs USA Card at the Newcastle Entertainment Centre. In 2006 Fabar was awarded the City of Orange Sports Personality of the Year Award.

=== Motorsports ===
Fabar is the builder of ZeroD, a 1967 Ford Falcon modified hot rod. It is certified by the Bond University to be the first sustainable, carbon-neutral custom car built in the world. It has won several national races in Australia. Fabar has competed in various Motorsport events, being named the Hot Rod Champion in the Meguair's MotorEx in 2005 and 2011. He has also won the Street Machine of the Year award in 2013, and was crowned Summernats Grand Champion in 2013. Fabar also built previous national award winning hotrods – 1929 Ford Pick up – Swoop and 1933 Ford Coupe – RAWR.

== Personal ==
Mick Fabar was born in Orange, New South Wales to John and Anne Fabar. He lives in Orange with his wife and three children. In 2007 Fabar’s youngest daughter was admitted to Westmead children’s Hospital Sydney with a life-threatening condition for which she made a full recovery.

== Charity ==
Fabar is a long standing board member of Ronald McDonald House Charities - 2004 to current, and has been pivotal in the funding and construction of Ronald McDonald House Orange. He is also a national ambassador for Stand Tall working with and inspiring under privileged teenagers.

== Legal issues ==
In early 2008, Fabar was charged with several counts of breaching apprehended violence orders. On 27 February 2008, he pleaded guilty to seven counts after police dropped 19 further charges. He was given a six-month suspended sentence. In June 2008, following an appeal, that sentence was reduced to an 18-month good behaviour bond, on account of Fabar's charity work with the Ronald McDonald House.
