= Oswego City School District =

School district in the U.S. state of New York

The Oswego City School District is a school district in Oswego, New York, serving the students of the city of Oswego and the towns of Oswego, Minetto, and Scriba. The district promotes itself with the slogan "Where the Learning Never Ends," a play on the city of Oswego's slogan, "Where the Water Never Ends."

The current Superintendent of Schools is Raymond Kilmer, III. Tom Ciappa is the Board of Education president.

== Schools ==
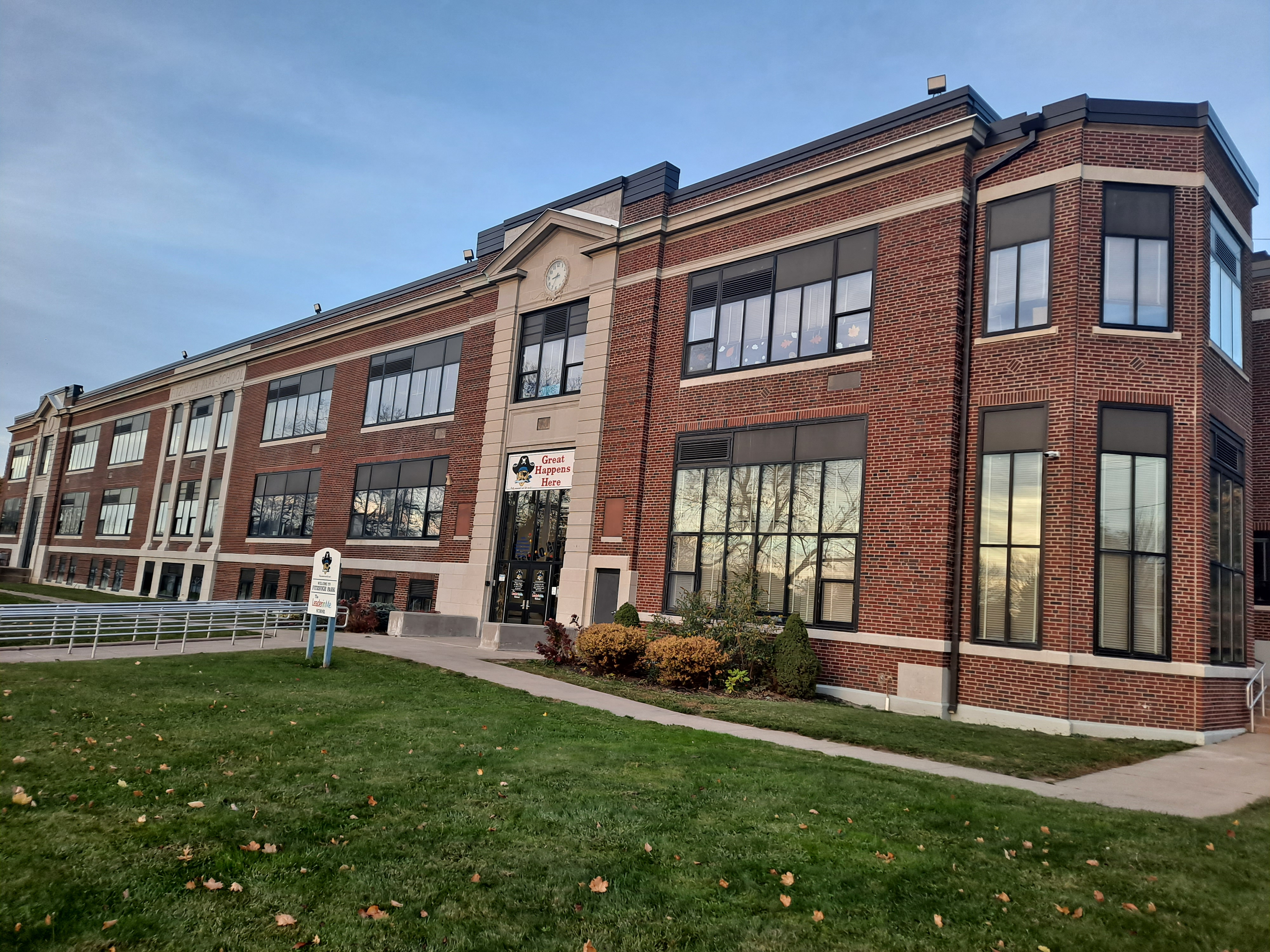
Fitzhugh Park School, the district's oldest facility.

The schools operated by the district are:

- Oswego High School (9-12)
- Oswego Middle School (7-8)
- Fitzhugh Park School (K-6)
- Charles E. Riley School (K-6)
- Kingsford Park School (K-6)
- Frederick Leighton School (K-6)
- Minetto School (K-6)

Trinity Catholic School (K-6) and Oswego Community Christian School (K-12) are served by the district's buses but are not operated by the district.

== Statistics ==
The Oswego City School District served 3,789 students as of 2016, with a student to teacher ratio of 12.2-1. In 2016, 37% of Oswego High School seniors graduated with a Regents Diploma, and 35% graduated with an Advanced Regents Diploma.
