= Oswego High School (New York) =

Location
- 2 Buccaneer Blvd; Oswego, New York 13126; United States; 43°27′1.90″N 76°31′27.10″W

Information
- Type: Public
- School district: Oswego City School District
- NCES School ID: 362205003130
- Principal: Dr. Raina Hinman
- Teaching staff: 12.31 (on an FTE basis)
- Grades: 9-12
- Enrollment: 1,080 (2021-2022)
- Student to teacher ratio: 87.70
- Campus: Suburban
- Colors: "Buc Blue" and White
- Mascot: Buccaneers
- Newspaper: The Buccaneer Bulletin
- Yearbook: The Paradox
- Website: www.oswego.org/highschool

Oswego High School is a public coeducational four-year high school in Oswego, New York. It is the only public school serving grades 9-12 in the Oswego City School District. The principal is Dr. Raina Hinman. Assistant principals are Tara Clark and Kirk Mulverhill. The dean of students is Penny Morley.

== Extracurricular activities ==
=== Athletics ===
Oswego High School teams compete in Section III of the New York State Public High School Athletic Association. Athletic facilities at the school include two gymnasiums, a swimming pool, a weight room, two softball fields, a baseball field, a track, and two multipurpose fields used for football, lacrosse, and soccer. Many events are held at Field, which hosts the track as well as a large athletic field.

=== The Paradox ===
The Paradox is Oswego High School's award-winning yearbook. It has won numerous awards from the Empire State School Press Association and the Columbia School Press Association.

=== The Buccaneer Bulletin ===
The Buccaneer Bulletin is Oswego High School's monthly newspaper, which has been awarded numerous gold medals from the Empire State School Press Association. Members of the staff have been recognized individually by the Newspapers in Education program.

=== WBUC ===
Students involved with WBUC at Oswego High School produce the morning announcements in an on-campus studio, which are broadcast to televisions in all classrooms as well as throughout the public locally on Time Warner Cable channel 16.

== Statistics ==
=== Diversity ===
- 1% Asian
- 5% Hispanic
- 1% African-American
- 93% Caucasian

=== Gender ===
- 50% female
- 50% male"

=== Graduation rate ===
Oswego High School has a graduation rate of 75%, below the New York State average of 86%.

=== Post graduation plans ===
- 48% plan to attend a four-year college in New York State
- 8% plan to attend a four-year college out of state
- 26% plan to attend a two-year college in New York State
- 3% plan to attend post secondary institutions in New York State

=== Expenditures per pupil ===
An estimated $22,029 is spent annually per student.

- 68% instructional
- 6% student & staff support
- 10% administration
- 17% other

=== Teacher credentials ===
- 2% of teachers have no valid teaching certificate
- 5% of teachers have less than 3 years of experience
- 21% of teachers have a master's degree or above

== Notable alumni ==
- Erik Cole, former NHL Player (2000-2015), and Stanley Cup Winner (2006), although he did not finish school at Oswego High School.
- Noel Francisco, class President, graduated 1987, 47th Solicitor General of the United States
- Willard A. Kitts, Vice admiral, USN and recipient of the Navy Cross
- Robert Natoli, strongman
- Sarah Corbin Robert, 17th President General of the Daughters of the American Revolution
- Curtis F. Shoup (January 11, 1921 – January 7, 1945) received the Medal of Honor for acts of bravery near Tillet in Belgium (now a deelgemeente of Sainte-Ode) on January 7, 1945. He was a graduate of Oswego High School in Oswego, New York.
