= The Magazine of Poetry and Literary Review =

The Magazine of Poetry and Literary Review began publication in 1889 in Buffalo, New York under the editorship of, and published by, Charles Wells Moulton. Other editors included Nettie Leila Michel. It is sometimes cited as The Magazine of Poetry, because that is what appeared on its headers. Some volumes have been reprinted in the 21st century.

== Publication history ==
- Moulton, Charles Wells (1889). The Magazine of Poetry, Volume 1. Charles Wells Moulton.
- Moulton, Charles Wells (1890). The Magazine of Poetry, Volume 2.
- Moulton, Charles Wells (1891). The Magazine of Poetry, Volume 3.
- Moulton, Charles Wells (1892). The Magazine of Poetry, Volume 4 Issue 3.
- Moulton, Charles Wells (1892). The Magazine of Poetry, Volume 4 Issue 4.
- Moulton, Charles Wells (1893). The Magazine of Poetry, Volume 5.
- Moulton, Charles Wells (1894). The Magazine of Poetry, Volume 6. Charles Wells Moulton.
- Moulton, Charles Wells (1895). The Magazine of Poetry, Volume 7.
