= USNS Sgt. Curtis F. Shoup =

American C1-M-AV1 coastal freighter

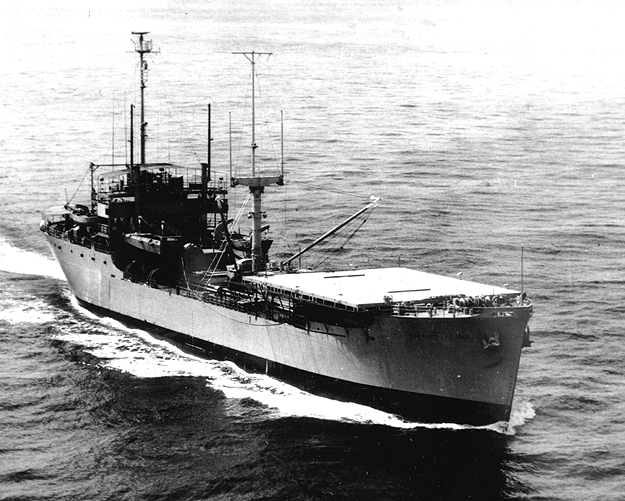
- USNS Sgt. Curtis F. Shoup (T-AG-175) underway, date and location unknown.

History

United States
- Name: Spindle Eye; Sgt. Curtis F. Shoup
- Namesake: Spindle Eye; Curtis F. Shoup who was awarded the Medal of Honor
- Ordered: as type (C1-M-AV1) hull, MC hull 2381
- Builder: Kaiser Cargo Inc., Richmond, California
- Laid down: 16 April 1945, as MV Spindle Eye
- Launched: 25 May 1945
- Sponsored by: Mrs. Edgar Buttner
- Completed: 9 July 1945
- In service: 26 July 1945, as USAT Spindle Eye; 1 March 1963, as USNS Sgt. Curtis F. Shoup (T-AG-175)
- Out of service: 20 December 1969
- Renamed: late-1947, USAT Curtis F. Shoup
- Refit: converted to a helicopter freighter at Willamette Iron & Steel in Portland, Oregon
- Stricken: 28 April 1970
- Identification: Hull symbol:T-AG-175
- Fate: Sold for scrapping, 9 May 1973, to John Liu, Washington, D.C.
- Notes: U.S. Official Number: 248,213

General characteristics
- Type: C1-M-AV1
- Tonnage: 3,812 GRT
- Displacement: 6,240 tons full load
- Length: 388 ft 9 in (118.5 m)
- Beam: 50 ft (15.240 m)
- Draft: 16 ft 10 in (5.1 m)
- Propulsion: 1 × Nordberg Diesel diesel TSM 6 engine; 1 × shaft
- Speed: 11.5 knots (13.2 mph; 21.3 km/h)
- Complement: 62
- Armament: none

USNS Sgt. Curtis F. Shoup (T-AG-175) was a C1-M-AV1 coastal freighter. Built as Spindle Eye, one of the many named for knots. (Note: In this case the spindle eye splice or shortened to simply spindle eye. The use of knot names, many obscure, gave this group of ships the common name "Knot" ships among mariners.) The ship, modified to be a "news transmission ship" for the press during the planned invasion of Japan, was completed 9 July 1945, delivered to the War Shipping Administration and placed under its agent Lykes Brothers Steamship Company the same day. Days later, on 26 July, Spindle Eye was bareboat chartered to the War Department for operation by the Army. The ship was renamed November 1947 by the Army, after serving as a radio relay ship at the Operation Crossroads atomic bomb tests and conversion to an Army passenger-cargo vessel, Sgt. Curtis F. Shoup in honor Sergeant Curtis F. Shoup who had been awarded the Medal of Honor.

After layup the U.S. Navy acquired the ship and placed her in service with the Military Sea Transportation Service (MSTS) as the USNS Sgt. Curtis F. Shoup. The ship was converted by the Navy into a helicopter freighter and later into a ship responsible for surveying, and oceanographic services. She was struck in 1970 and sold for scrapping.

== Construction ==
Spindle Eye was laid down on 16 April 1945 under Maritime Commission Contract (MC hull 2381) by Kaiser Cargo Inc., Richmond, California Number 4 Yard. The ship was launched on 25 May 1945; sponsored by Mrs. Edgar Buttner; and delivered to the Lykes Brothers Steamship Company on 9 July 1945. On 27 July Spindle Eye was bareboat chartered to the War Department for operation by the Army.

== World War II-related service ==
Spindle Eye was designed to ferry war correspondents, but World War II ended before she could perform this duty. General MacArthur requested a vessel for the press, a "news transmission ship" with full facilities, on 22 May 1945. The facilities would include broadcasting facilities, correspondent quarters, a press room, and capability to carry vehicles. The vessel finally provided was Spindle Eye, described as a "radio city," with a 7,500 and four 3,000 watt transmitters and fully equipped broadcasting studios. The ship was crewed by 45 merchant mariners in addition to a basic Army Transport Service (ATS) crew and staffed by 35 Signal Corps personnel and 3 Navy radar operators.

Though designed to cover the invasion of Japan the ship did not sail until 16 September 1945. The Army public relations staff used the ship to transport correspondents on a tour of Nagasaki, Korea and Shanghai. The ship remained in theater until April 1946.

== Cold War Service ==
Spindle Eye was a relay radio ship for the atomic bomb tests Bikini, Operation Crossroads, before conversion to an Army passenger ship. The ship was one of several renamed by the Army in 1947 for those awarded the Medal of Honor thus becoming Sgt. Curtis F. Shoup. Shoup was laid up in the Maritime Administration's National Defense Reserve Fleet in 1950 when the Army fleet was being transferred to the Navy or laid up.

On 16 January 1963, Sgt. Curtis F. Shoup was transferred to the Military Sea Transport Service (MSTS), and she was placed on the Navy List on 1 March. After conversion by Willamette Iron & Steel Works in Portland, Oregon, for service as a helicopter freighter, Sgt. Curtis F. Shoup was assigned to MSTS, Pacific Area.

Sgt. Curtis F. Shoup Southwest Pacific Survey.

Reporting on 14 June, she teamed up with Harris County (LST-822) in the southwest Pacific Ocean, servicing survey sites which were being established to support the nation's missile and space projects. U.S. Air Force helicopters flew from her deck, and she carried four to six oceanographers from the Naval Oceanographic Office in Washington, D.C.. Charts and sailing directions for the historic World War II area were revised as a result. Between May 1963 and November 1965 78,500 nmi (90,300 mi; 145,400 km) of magnetic and other data were collected in an irregular pattern using LORAN-A, radar, celestial and dead reckoning control.

In November 1966 the ship was placed under the technical control of the Naval Oceanographic Office to meet increased requirements for gravity data. With Sgt. George D Keathley, assigned May 1967, the ship engaged in gravity, magnetic and bathymetric surveys for military use. During May 1968, USNS Shoup conducted various oceanographic operations along a track pattern from roughly 20 to 140 miles from the Egyptian coast.

== Final decommissioning ==
Sgt. Curtis F. Shoup was withdrawn from service and stripped of oceanographic equipment on 20 December 1969. On 22 January 1970, she was returned to the Maritime Administration and laid up in the National Defense Reserve Fleet at Suisun Bay, California. Sgt. Curtis F. Shoup was struck from the Navy List on 28 April 1970. On 9 May 1973, she was sold to Mr. John Liu of Washington, D.C., for non-transportation purposes.
