= David Blair McClosky =

American opera singer

David Blair McClosky (1902–1988) was a classical baritone, voice teacher, and vocal therapist, and author of two books on vocal technique. His academic positions included Syracuse University, New England Conservatory, Boston University and Boston Conservatory, and his voice clients included President John F. Kennedy, President Lyndon B. Johnson, Gov. Michael S. Dukakis, sportscaster Curt Gowdy, actors Faye Dunaway, Al Pacino, Jill Clayburgh and Ruth Gordon, and folksinger Joan Baez. His method of vocal production, called The McClosky Technique, is now taught by members of the McClosky Institute of Voice.

McClosky was born in Oswego, NY to two professional singers. His career began early: he was first hired to sing at age 17, and began teaching voice while still in high school. He studied for six years at the New England Conservatory, and while in Boston became that city's first radio announcer, on WNAC. During 1927–1934 he appeared as a soloist twenty times with the Boston Symphony Orchestra, and also appeared with the New York Philharmonic, and the Minneapolis, Chicago, Indianapolis, and Buffalo Symphonies. In 1934–1935 he undertook postgraduate study in Germany and Italy, and then in 1936 he taught for a semester at Vassar College, where he met his future wife, Barbara Henneberger (1917–2015), whom he would marry in 1944. (Barbara was known professionally in the 1940s as Barbara Jevne.) From 1935–1942, McClosky gave opera, light opera, oratorio and concert performances, and gave four recitals at the Town Hall in New York City. In 1942, McClosky joined the US Army, and performed public relations duties in the USA and Africa.

After the war, McClosky taught at Syracuse University (1945–1952). In 1946, recovering from injury and illness, McClosky was scheduled to give another recital at New York City's Town Hall. Two weeks before the recital, his doctor advised him to cancel, but instead he spent the time on "light vocal exercises," and was able to perform successfully. This was a turning point in his career, and it is from this experience that he went on to develop The McClosky Technique. As part of his study of the vocal mechanism, McClosky worked for five years with Dr. Irl Blaisdell (1911–1953) of Syracuse University, studying both singers and patients.

From 1946–1955, McClosky founded and directed the Plymouth Rock Center of Music and Drama, but during this time he continued his work in voice teaching and vocal therapy. From 1950–1967 he taught voice at Boston University. In 1952 he was appointed Staff Associate in Voice Therapy at Massachusetts Eye and Ear Infirmary, and in 1959 he published his first book, Your Voice At Its Best. In 1960, he joined the presidential campaign of John F. Kennedy to coach the future president on his voice use. Dave Powers, an aide to Kennedy, later recalled, "Mr. McClosky's advice to all comers...is to relax, maintain good posture, breathe deeply, and reduce any tightness in the neck."

In 1967, McClosky retired from Boston University and joined the faculty of the Boston Conservatory, where he established a graduate course in voice therapy. From 1976–1983 he re-established a voice therapy clinic at the Massachusetts Eye and Ear Infirmary, where he worked alongside Lin Wallin Schuller, a lifelong student of his. During this time, Ms. Schuller approached him about establishing the McClosky Institute of Voice to continue his work beyond his lifetime, and this organization was founded (as the McClosky Institute of Voice Therapy Inc.) in 1979. In 1984 he published his second book, Voice in Song and Speech, co-authored with his wife. At age 79 he appeared as soloist in the Verdi Requiem, and at age 80 he gave a solo recital. He taught until his final illness. McClosky died on September 10, 1988.

The McClosky Institute of Voice has carried on Mr. McClosky's work. In 1982 the institute began offering vocal technique classes; in 1996 the institute began certifying instructors in the technique, who are called "Certified McClosky Voice Technicians"; and in 2011 members of the institute combined and updated McClosky's two books, re-issuing them as a single volume under the title Your Voice At Its Best (5th ed.) by Waveland Press.
