= Rose Morgan French =

American suffragist

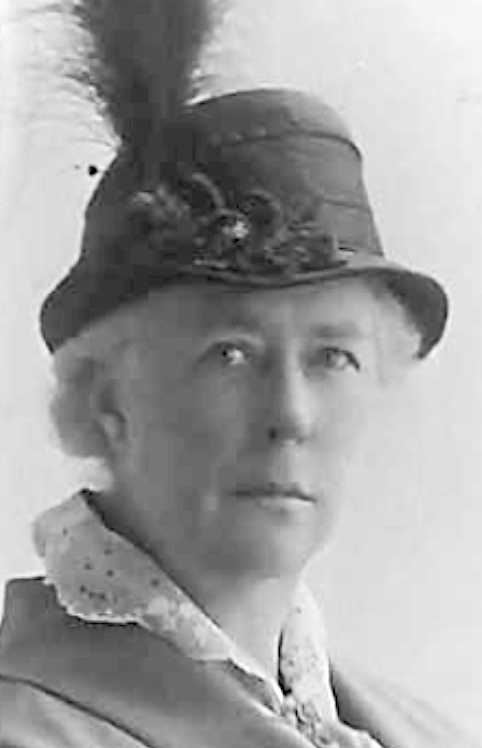
- Rose Morgan French, from her 1919 passport application
- Born: June 15, 1859; Oswego, New York
- Died: January 9, 1929 (aged 69); Los Angeles, California
- Occupation(s): Suffragist, peace activist

Rose Morgan French (June 15, 1859 – January 9, 1929) was an American suffragist, temperance and peace activist. She represented California suffragists as a delegate to the International Congress of Women, when it met in The Hague in 1915, and in Zürich in 1919.

== Early life ==
Rose E. Morgan was born in Oswego, New York.

== Career ==
French was President of the Women's Federation of Public Good in San Francisco. She was a member of the Women's International League for Peace and Freedom (WILPF), Woman's Christian Temperance Union (WCTU), the National Woman Suffrage Association (NWSA), and the California Equal Suffrage Association. She was a member of the board of directors of the California Girls' Training Home, volunteered as a "special police officer", and advocated for prisoners' rights. "We have the brotherhood of man," she said in a 1911 speech, adding that "what we need sadly is the sisterhood of woman." After California women won the right to vote, she traveled to other states campaigning for women's suffrage.

She was a delegate to the International Congress of Women at its 1915 meeting in the Hague, and at its 1919 meeting in Zürich. She corresponded with Jane Addams and was close to Hungarian feminist Rosika Schwimmer.

== Personal life ==
Morgan married English-born ophthalmologist Hayes Clifton French in 1878. They had a son who died young, and two daughters, Victoria and Davida. Her husband died in 1902, and she died in 1929, at the age of 69, from injuries sustained in a car accident in Los Angeles.
