= Oswego, New York =

City in Oswego County, New York, US

Oswego Onondaga: Deyoʼswé·geʼ
- City
- City of Oswego
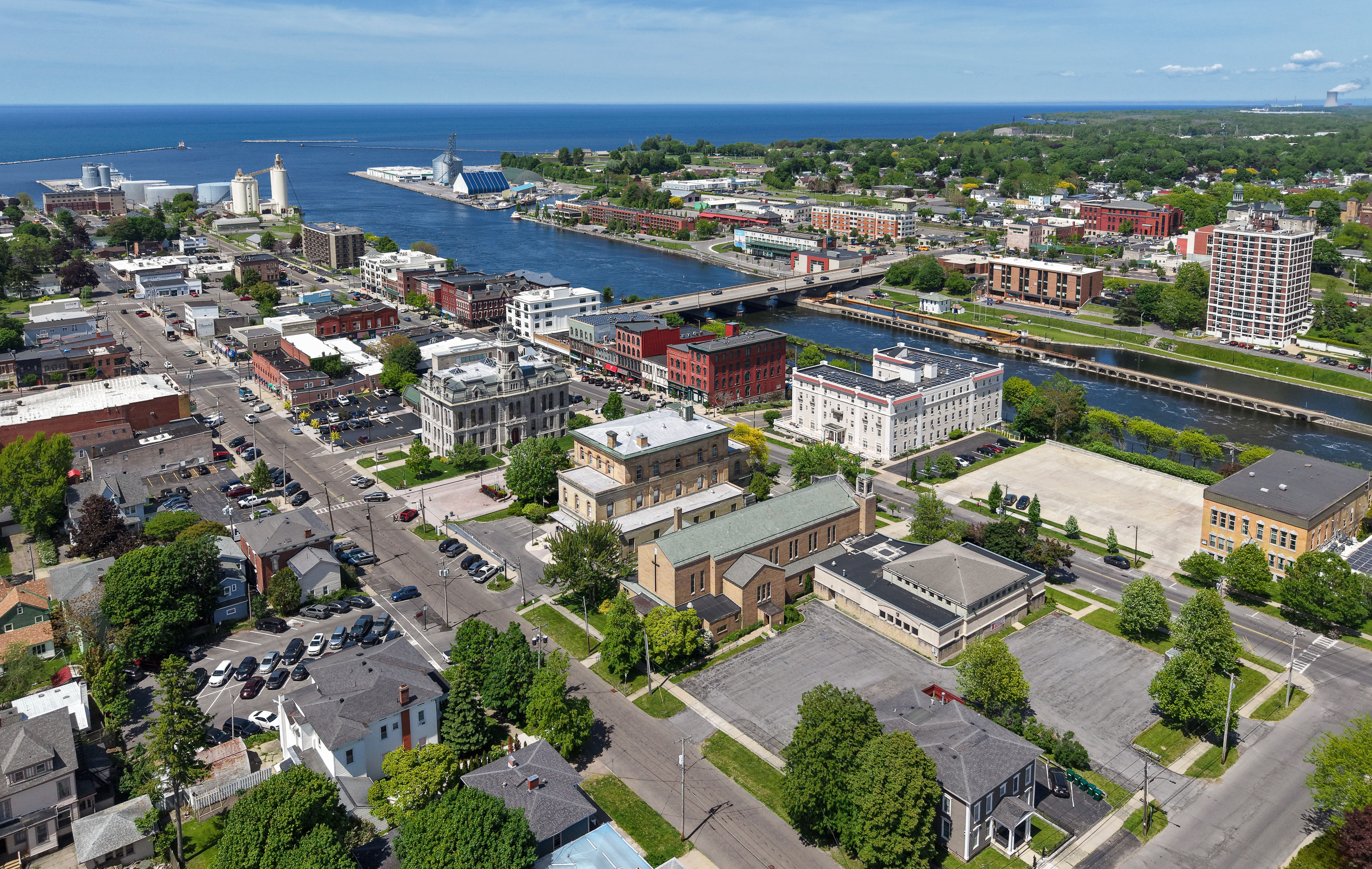
- Downtown Oswego
- Nickname: The Port City
- Mottoes: "Where the Water Never Ends" "Cool by Nature"
- Location in Oswego County and the state of New York.
- Coordinates: 43°27′17″N 76°30′24″W
- Country: United States
- State: New York
- County: Oswego
- As a Fort: 1796; 230 years ago
- Incorporated (village): 1828; 198 years ago
- Incorporated (city): 1848; 178 years ago

Government
  - Type: Mayor-Council
  - Mayor: Robert A. Corradino (R)
  - Common Council: Member List: • W1: Kyle Walton (R); • W2: Shawn Burridge (R); • W3: Jessie Vanucchi (R); • W4: Shawn P. Walker (R); • W5: John B. Gosek (R); • W6: Tim Plunkett (R); • W7: Peter Allen (R)

Area
  - Total: 11.23 sq mi (29.08 km^{2})
  - Land: 7.61 sq mi (19.72 km^{2})
  - Water: 3.61 sq mi (9.36 km^{2}) 31%
- Elevation: 285 ft (87 m)

Population (2020)
  - Total: 16,921
  - Density: 2,222.4/sq mi (858.06/km^{2})
- Demonym: Oswegonian
- Time zone: UTC−5 (EST)
  - Summer (DST): UTC−4 (EDT)
- ZIP Code: 13126
- Area code: 315
- FIPS code: 36-55574
- GNIS feature ID: 0959525
- Website: www.oswegony.gov

Oswego (/ɒsˈwiːɡoʊ/ oss-WEE-goh, Onondaga: Deyoʼswé·geʼ ) is a city in and the county seat of Oswego County, New York, United States. The population was 16,921 at the 2020 census. Oswego is situated at the mouth of the Oswego River on the southeastern shore of Lake Ontario in Upstate New York, about 40 miles (64 km) northwest of Syracuse and 74 miles (119 km) east-northeast of Rochester by road. The city promotes itself as "The Port City of Central New York".

The first European settlement at Oswego was a British trading post established in 1722, and it was first incorporated as a village in 1828 before becoming a city in 1848. British forces briefly captured the city during the War of 1812, but were defeated nearby later that same month. The canalization of the Oswego River was a major boon to Oswego, attracting settlement and investment; this was later bolstered by its status as a rail hub for much of the 19th and 20th centuries, though this status had begun to decline by the 1940s. During World War II, Fort Ontario was the site of the only Jewish refugee camp in the United States. Today, the city's economy is primarily based around manufacturing and services.

Oswego is governed by a mayor, currently Republican Rob Corradino, and a city council. The city is located within the Syracuse metropolitan area, and is also inside Syracuse's broader media market. It is bordered by the towns of Oswego, Minetto, and Scriba to the west, south, and east, respectively; and by Lake Ontario to the north. Oswego Speedway is a nationally known automobile racing facility. The State University of New York at Oswego (SUNY Oswego) is located just outside the city in the town of Oswego, on the shores of Lake Ontario, and is a major force in the area.

== History ==
=== Early history ===
The British established a trading post in the area in 1722 and fortified it with a log palisade later called Fort Oswego, named after the native Iroquois place name "os-we-go" meaning "pouring out place" (Onondaga: Deyoʼswé·geʼ ). The first fortification on the site of the current Fort Ontario was built by the British in 1755 and called the "Fort of the Six Nations".

=== Military base ===
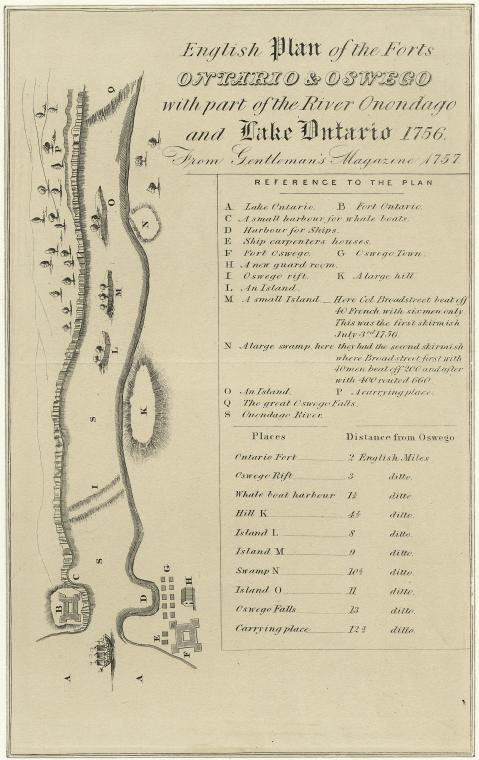
Fort Oswego 1756 (image shows replica map from 1850)

Fort Ontario was destroyed by the French upon capturing it in the Battle of Fort Ontario, during the French and Indian War. Construction of a second British fort began on the same site in 1759, but Fort Ontario was only used as a cannon emplacement. During the American Revolution, the British abandoned the Fort, and in 1778, American troops destroyed it. In 1782, the British reoccupied Fort Ontario, and didn't forfeit it to the U.S. until 1796, thirteen years after the cessation of hostilities in the Revolution.

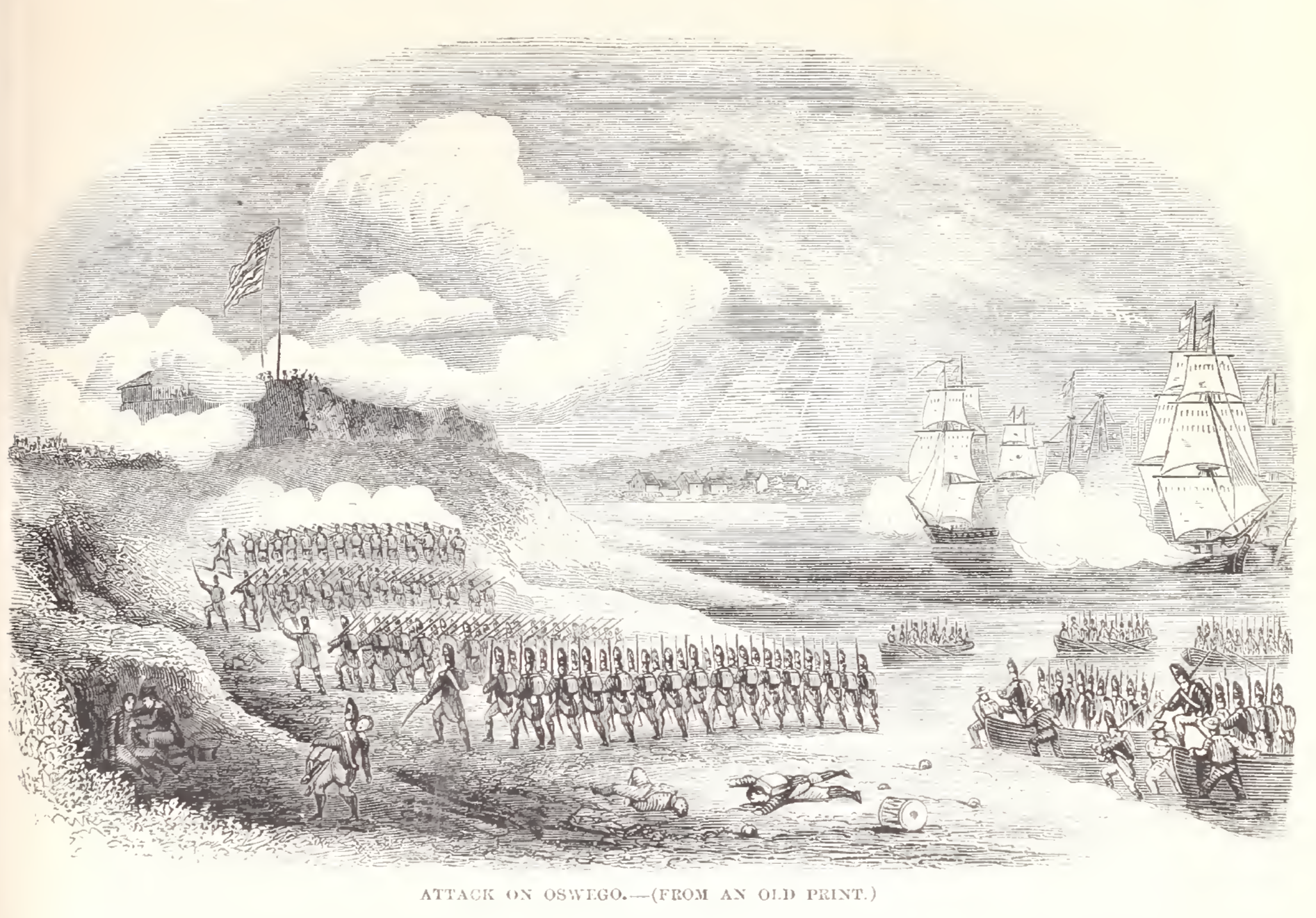
Attack on Oswego, War of 1812

During the War of 1812, a weaker American garrison at Fort Ontario was overwhelmed by superior British forces in order to stem the flow of supplies from the interior of New York state, but were later defeated near Oswego later that month. Throughout the 19th Century, the U.S. military maintained a presence at Fort Ontario.

=== Growth ===
Oswego was incorporated as a village on March 14, 1828, and the Oswego Canal, a branch of the Erie Canal, reached the area in 1829. The city was incorporated in 1848. When the city incorporated, its area and population were removed from the figures reported for the towns.

In the 1850s, at the height of a popular water-cure movement occurring in the United States, in turn stimulating growth, Oswego was the home of the Oswego Water Cure establishment, which Stonewall Jackson reportedly visited in August 1850.

=== Railroads' role in growth ===
Oswego is home to the Port of Oswego and once was a hub for several major railroads: the New York Central Railroad (NYC), the Delaware, Lackawanna and Western Railroad (DL&W) and the New York, Ontario and Western Railway (O&W). Railways operated a coal trestle for fueling steamships at the Port of Oswego. Into the mid-1940s, the DL&W had daily passenger service from Hoboken, through Binghamton, to Syracuse ending in Oswego. The New York Central last had passenger service between Oswego, Fulton and Syracuse in 1951. Former NYC and DL&W passenger stations remain, as does a NYC freight station. Nothing remains of the O&W, which was abandoned in its entirety on March 30, 1957. The tunnel from the former O&W is used as a rail trail.

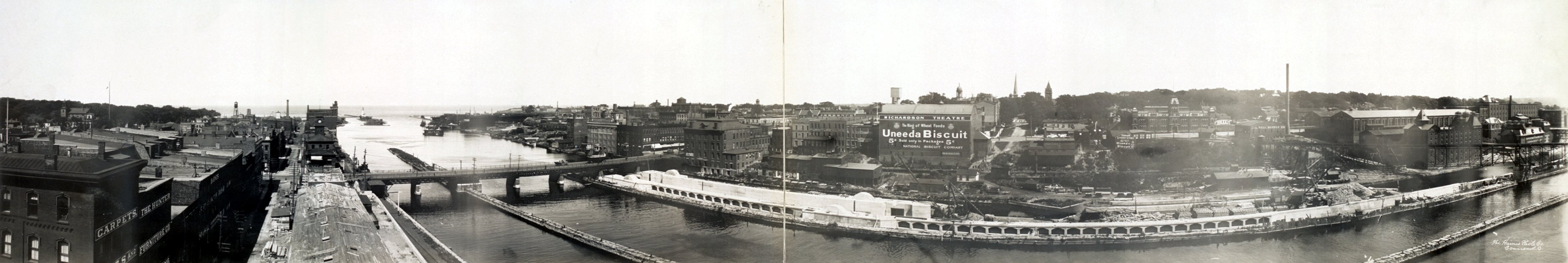
1909 panorama

=== Fort Ontario ===
Fort Ontario was built between 1839 and 1844. Major masonry improvements to the forts outer wall were undertaken, but left incomplete when Congress canceled its funding in 1872. By 1901, the old fort was abandoned.

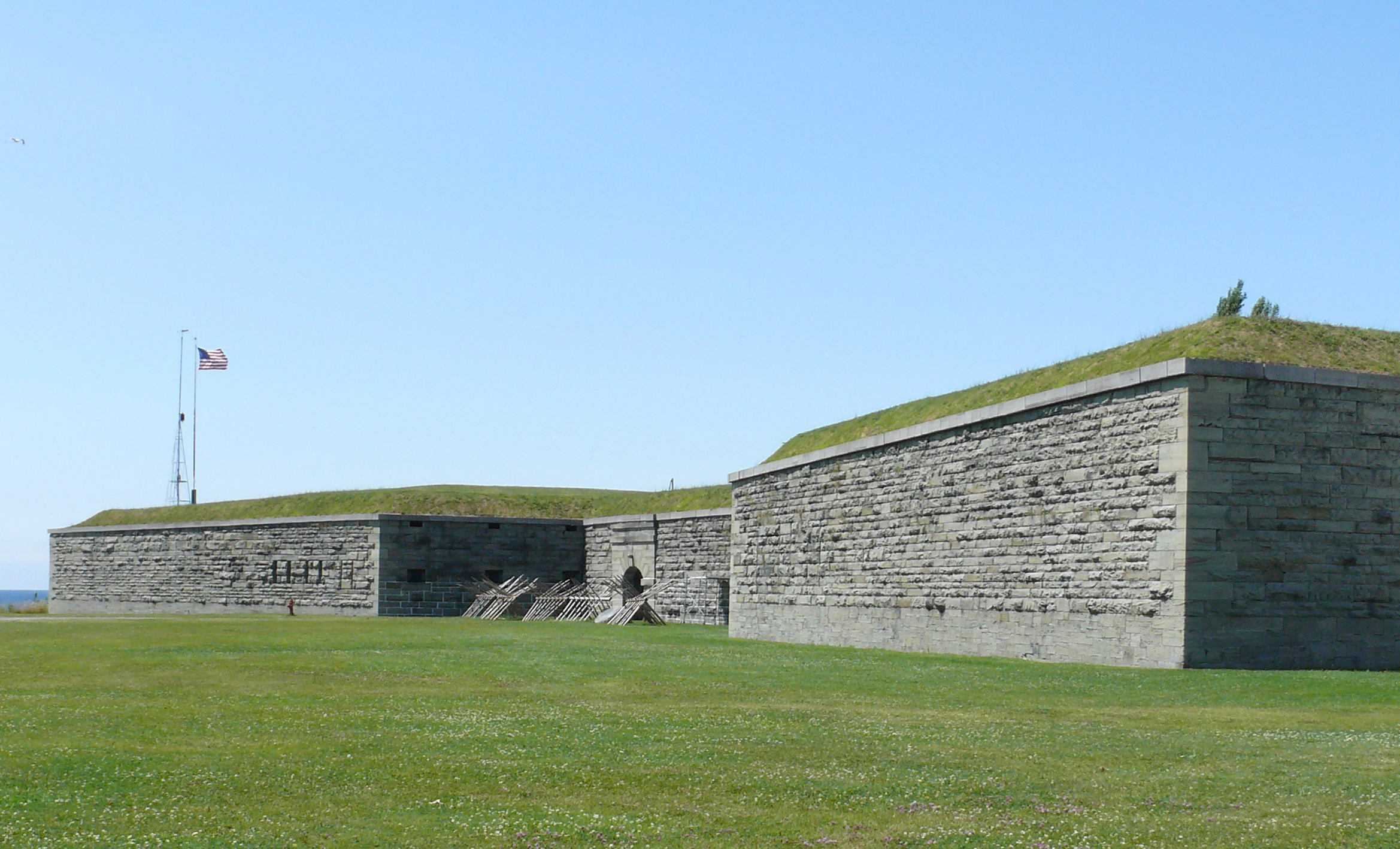
The walls of Fort Ontario

The 2nd Brigade of the U.S. 1st Infantry Division called Fort Ontario home until the brigade was deactivated on June 1, 1940. During World War II it was used for interning Jewish refugees from Europe (see section below).

In 1946, the fort was transferred to the state of New York. At that time, it was used to house veterans and their families during the post-war period. Development of the fort as a historic site began in 1949, which included the "Safe Haven Museum".

Today, Fort Ontario is being restored to its 1867–1872 appearance. Costumed interpreters recreate the lives of the officers, men, and civilians who garrisoned the fort in 1868–1869.

=== World War II refugee camp ===
In 1944 amidst World War II, President Franklin D. Roosevelt established a camp at the fort for survivors of the Holocaust.

The fort was used as Fort Ontario Emergency Refugee Shelter also known as "Safe Haven", home to approximately 982 Jewish refugees, survivors of the Nazi Holocaust, from August 1944 to February 1946. This was the only attempt by the United States government to shelter Jewish refugees during the war.

Approximately 1,000 refugees were transferred to the fort from the Ferramonti di Tarsia, a concentration camp in Cosenza, Calabria, Italy. The refugees came from 18 different European countries.

The refugees were placed behind barbed wire, and given no official status, having been required to sign papers accepting their eventual return to their home countries in Europe at the end of the war. Due to political pressure, President Harry S. Truman allowed them to apply for citizenship.

The camp comprised 200 buildings of converted army barracks. The site is now the Safe Haven Museum.

== Geography ==
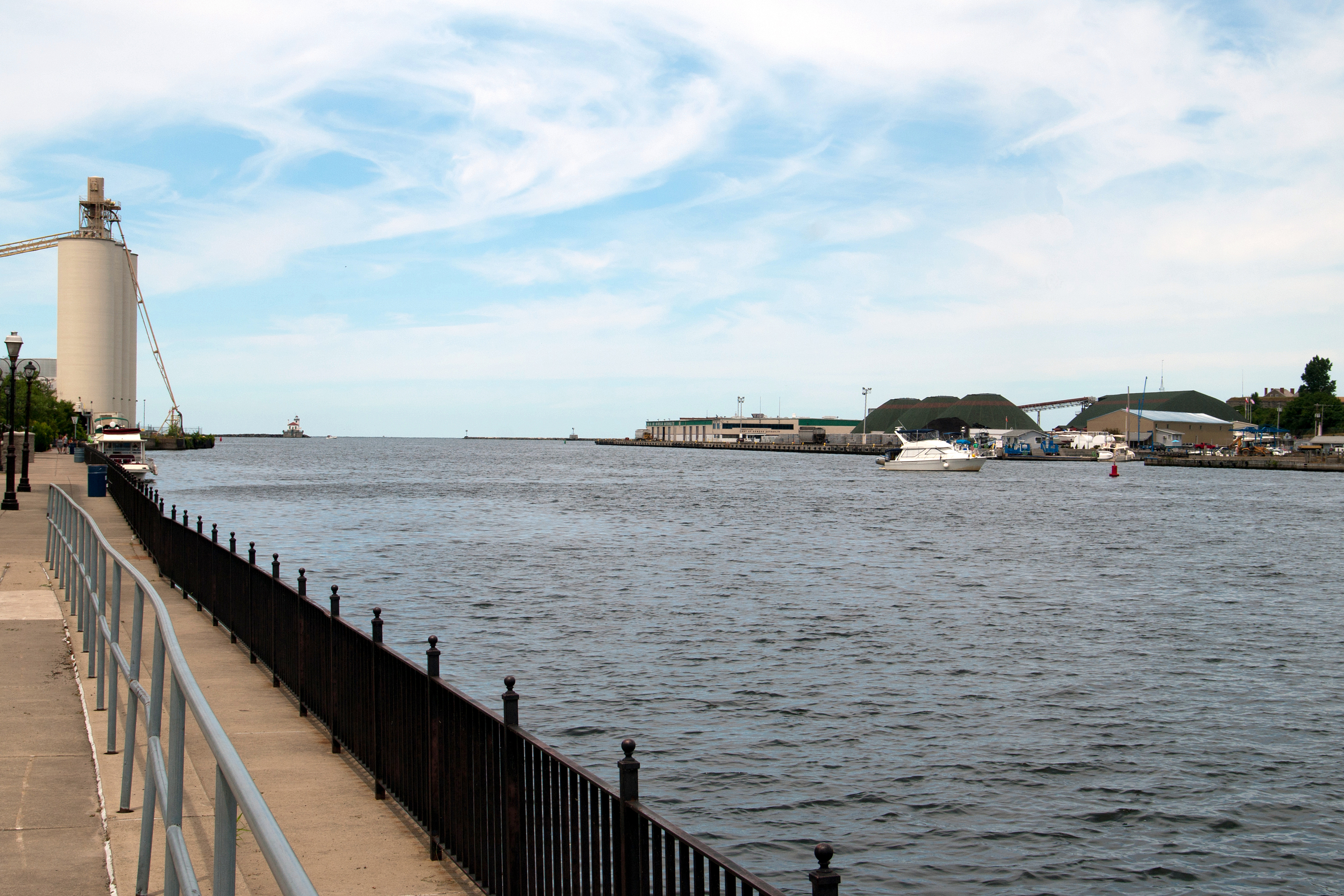
Oswego River flowing into Lake Ontario

According to the United States Census Bureau, the city has a total area of 11.2 square miles (29 km^{2}), of which 7.7 square miles (20 km^{2}) is land and 3.6 square miles (9.3 km^{2}) (31.76%) is water.

Oswego is located on the southeastern shore of Lake Ontario at the mouth of the Oswego River, approximately 35 miles north of Syracuse and 69 miles east of Rochester. The elevation is 298 feet above sea level. The nearest city is Fulton, located south of Oswego and north of Syracuse.

As Oswego is located on the eastern shore of Lake Ontario, in the center of the Snowbelt, the region often sees prodigious lake effect snow accumulations. Oswego is one of the snowiest towns in America, with some winters totaling over 300 inches. In 2007, Oswego gained national attention when approximately 130″ (slightly less than 11 feet) of snow fell in a two-week timespan. This broke the record of the Blizzard of 1966, which blanketed the city with 102″ of snow. As a result of this storm, the school district closed all facilities for a week, effectively shifting the planned winter holiday.

=== Locations and communities near Oswego ===
- Oswego: the town of Oswego
- Minetto: the town of Minetto south of the city
- Scriba: the town of Scriba east of the city
- Southwest Oswego: a hamlet located west of the city
- Fruit Valley: a hamlet located west of the city

=== Climate ===
Oswego has a warm-summer humid continental climate (Köppen Dfb) bordering on a hot-summer climate (Köppen Dfa) characterized by cold, snowy winters and warm, often humid summers, typical of the Interior Northeast; it experiences four distinct seasons, and is located in USDA hardiness zone 6a (average extreme annual minimum temperature of −10 to −5 °F (−23 to −21 °C). The city is known for typically experiencing exceptionally snowy winters, with an average seasonal snowfall of 140.1 inches (356 cm); this is owed primarily to its prolific lake-effect snowfall. Lake-effect precipitation, which begins as rain when the season kicks off in September or October, also contributes to Oswego's autumn precipitation maximum, unusual in this part of North America and typically experienced on the west coast of continents. Occasionally, nor'easters also contribute to the city's snowfall, as do Alberta clipper systems.

Lake Ontario also provides significant temperature moderation, allowing for slightly warmer winters and cooler summers than locations a few miles inland; during the transitional seasons, these differences can occasionally be dramatic. As a consequence of this moderation, 90 °F (32 °C) days are quite rare in Oswego, and the city has never recorded a temperature reaching 100 °F (38 °C). The lake's cooler temperatures also inhibit thunderstorm development into midsummer, though storm activity increases into August and even through early fall as the lake warms, as do precipitation and relative humidity. During the fall, lake moderation often extends the growing season by days or sometimes even weeks compared to more starkly continental inland locales.

Climate data for Oswego, New York (1991–2020 normals, extremes 1926–present)
| Month | Jan | Feb | Mar | Apr | May | Jun | Jul | Aug | Sep | Oct | Nov | Dec | Year |
|---|---|---|---|---|---|---|---|---|---|---|---|---|---|
| Record high °F (°C) | 69 (21) | 69 (21) | 83 (28) | 90 (32) | 91 (33) | 96 (36) | 95 (35) | 97 (36) | 96 (36) | 86 (30) | 79 (26) | 69 (21) | 97 (36) |
| Mean maximum °F (°C) | 53.2 (11.8) | 51.6 (10.9) | 63.0 (17.2) | 77.8 (25.4) | 83.8 (28.8) | 88.4 (31.3) | 89.8 (32.1) | 89.6 (32.0) | 86.0 (30.0) | 77.4 (25.2) | 66.4 (19.1) | 54.9 (12.7) | 91.4 (33.0) |
| Mean daily maximum °F (°C) | 31.1 (−0.5) | 33.2 (0.7) | 40.9 (4.9) | 53.2 (11.8) | 65.7 (18.7) | 74.8 (23.8) | 79.6 (26.4) | 78.5 (25.8) | 71.6 (22.0) | 59.2 (15.1) | 47.3 (8.5) | 36.7 (2.6) | 56.0 (13.3) |
| Daily mean °F (°C) | 25.0 (−3.9) | 26.7 (−2.9) | 34.2 (1.2) | 45.3 (7.4) | 56.8 (13.8) | 66.1 (18.9) | 71.5 (21.9) | 70.4 (21.3) | 63.4 (17.4) | 52.1 (11.2) | 41.4 (5.2) | 31.3 (−0.4) | 48.7 (9.3) |
| Mean daily minimum °F (°C) | 18.9 (−7.3) | 20.2 (−6.6) | 27.4 (−2.6) | 37.3 (2.9) | 47.9 (8.8) | 57.4 (14.1) | 63.4 (17.4) | 62.3 (16.8) | 55.2 (12.9) | 45.1 (7.3) | 35.4 (1.9) | 26.0 (−3.3) | 41.4 (5.2) |
| Mean minimum °F (°C) | −0.9 (−18.3) | 3.1 (−16.1) | 9.3 (−12.6) | 25.2 (−3.8) | 35.6 (2.0) | 44.7 (7.1) | 53.1 (11.7) | 51.3 (10.7) | 40.5 (4.7) | 31.5 (−0.3) | 20.9 (−6.2) | 7.8 (−13.4) | −4.0 (−20.0) |
| Record low °F (°C) | −21 (−29) | −21 (−29) | −9 (−23) | 13 (−11) | 28 (−2) | 36 (2) | 44 (7) | 42 (6) | 30 (−1) | 21 (−6) | 4 (−16) | −23 (−31) | −23 (−31) |
| Average precipitation inches (mm) | 3.76 (96) | 2.85 (72) | 3.03 (77) | 3.48 (88) | 3.29 (84) | 3.38 (86) | 3.37 (86) | 3.45 (88) | 3.92 (100) | 4.59 (117) | 4.12 (105) | 3.89 (99) | 43.13 (1,096) |
| Average snowfall inches (cm) | 44.7 (114) | 35.3 (90) | 17.1 (43) | 2.8 (7.1) | 0.0 (0.0) | 0.0 (0.0) | 0.0 (0.0) | 0.0 (0.0) | 0.0 (0.0) | 0.2 (0.51) | 9.4 (24) | 30.6 (78) | 140.1 (356) |
| Average extreme snow depth inches (cm) | 20.0 (51) | 20.8 (53) | 12.8 (33) | 1.3 (3.3) | 0.0 (0.0) | 0.0 (0.0) | 0.0 (0.0) | 0.0 (0.0) | 0.0 (0.0) | 0.1 (0.25) | 4.0 (10) | 11.0 (28) | 26.3 (67) |
| Average precipitation days (≥ 0.01 in) | 20.1 | 16.4 | 14.6 | 13.8 | 12.6 | 11.8 | 11.0 | 10.9 | 11.0 | 15.1 | 16.3 | 18.8 | 172.4 |
| Average snowy days (≥ 0.1 in) | 18.2 | 14.5 | 8.5 | 2.2 | 0.0 | 0.0 | 0.0 | 0.0 | 0.0 | 0.3 | 5.6 | 13.0 | 62.3 |
Source: NOAA

== Transportation ==
NY 481 (from I-81) runs north–south to Oswego from Syracuse and Fulton. NY 104 runs east/west from Rochester to Oswego.

Central New York Regional Transportation Authority provides service within Oswego and connections to Fulton and Syracuse. Oswego County Public Transit provides service between Oswego and smaller communities in Oswego County.

== Demographics ==
Historical population
| Census | Pop. | Note | %± |
|---|---|---|---|
| 1850 | 12,205 | | — |
| 1860 | 16,816 | | 37.8% |
| 1870 | 20,910 | | 24.3% |
| 1880 | 21,116 | | 1.0% |
| 1890 | 21,842 | | 3.4% |
| 1900 | 22,199 | | 1.6% |
| 1910 | 23,368 | | 5.3% |
| 1920 | 23,626 | | 1.1% |
| 1930 | 22,652 | | −4.1% |
| 1940 | 22,062 | | −2.6% |
| 1950 | 22,647 | | 2.7% |
| 1960 | 22,155 | | −2.2% |
| 1970 | 20,913 | | −5.6% |
| 1980 | 19,793 | | −5.4% |
| 1990 | 19,195 | | −3.0% |
| 2000 | 17,954 | | −6.5% |
| 2010 | 18,142 | | 1.0% |
| 2020 | 16,921 | | −6.7% |
U.S. Decennial Census

=== 2020 census ===
As of the 2020 census, Oswego had a population of 16,921. The median age was 37.7 years. 20.1% of residents were under the age of 18 and 18.4% of residents were 65 years of age or older. For every 100 females there were 92.6 males, and for every 100 females age 18 and over there were 90.6 males age 18 and over.

99.1% of residents lived in urban areas, while 0.9% lived in rural areas.

There were 7,206 households in Oswego, of which 24.6% had children under the age of 18 living in them. Of all households, 32.6% were married-couple households, 23.1% were households with a male householder and no spouse or partner present, and 33.4% were households with a female householder and no spouse or partner present. About 37.5% of all households were made up of individuals and 14.3% had someone living alone who was 65 years of age or older.

There were 8,324 housing units, of which 13.4% were vacant. The homeowner vacancy rate was 1.8% and the rental vacancy rate was 11.9%.

Racial composition as of the 2020 census
| Race | Number | Percent |
|---|---|---|
| White | 14,892 | 88.0% |
| Black or African American | 416 | 2.5% |
| American Indian and Alaska Native | 60 | 0.4% |
| Asian | 248 | 1.5% |
| Native Hawaiian and Other Pacific Islander | 4 | 0.0% |
| Some other race | 310 | 1.8% |
| Two or more races | 991 | 5.9% |
| Hispanic or Latino (of any race) | 1,022 | 6.0% |

=== 2010 census ===
As of the census of 2010, there were 18,142 people, 7,486 households, and 3,896 families residing in the 8,258 housing units in the city. The population density was 2,343.4 inhabitants per square mile (904.8/km^{2}). The racial makeup of the city was 94.1% White, 2.3% African American, 0.1% Native American, 1.5% Asian, .6% from other races, and 1.5% from two or more races. Hispanic or Latino of any race were 5.1% of the population.

=== Income and poverty ===
The median income for a household in the city was $39,867, and the median income for a family was $57,324. Males employed full-time, year-round, had a median income of $50,074 versus $33,211 for similarly situated females. The per capita income for the city was $21,139. 24.2% of the population and 14.4% of families were below the poverty line.

== Politics ==
The city is governed by a mayor, currently Republican Rob Corradino, and a board of seven aldermen who are elected from the city's seven wards. Recent previous mayors include Republican Billy Barlow, Democrats Tom Gillen and Randy Bateman, and Republican John Gosek.

=== Political controversy ===
In September 2005, Oswego Mayor John Gosek was arrested by the FBI and state police in a sting operation outside of a motel near Syracuse after allegedly giving a woman $250 to arrange a sexual encounter with two 14-year-old girls. The arrest came after a three-year investigation that led to charges of the mayor using his city-issued cell phone to "persuade, induce, entice and coerce an individual under the age of 18 years to engage in sexual activity". The charge alleged that Gosek used his phone as interstate commerce for the purposes of illegal sex and falls under a federal law that is commonly known as the Mann Act. Gosek's term wasn't due to expire until 2007, but he resigned from office five days after his arrest.

In March 2024, the City of Oswego, prior mayoral administration and recent mayoral administration Rob Corradino and Common council members, voted and overrode the assessment process, raising the City of Oswego residential property assessments to address a budget shortfall. Properties owners expressed frustration at a council meeting, with some noting that their taxes had doubled or nearly tripled.

== Notable people ==
- Neil Bancroft, U.S. Army soldier in the Black Hills War
- George Barnard, Civil War photographer and portrait photography pioneer
- Joey Belladonna, singer of heavy metal band Anthrax
- Owen Benjamin, formerly Smith, actor and comedian
- David Branshaw, PGA Tour golfer
- Latham A. Burrows, former New York State Senator
- Fenimore Chatterton, sixth Governor of Wyoming
- Erik Cole, NHL hockey player, Olympian
- Francis D. Culkin, former US Congressman
- Noel Francisco, former Solicitor General of the United States
- Rose Morgan French (1859–1929), suffragist and peace activist
- Robert H. Gittins, former US Congressman
- Joe Gosek, racing driver
- George Grant, doctor and inventor
- John Porter Hatch, Union army general
- Robert M. Hensel, disability advocate, poet and world record holder
- Willard A. Kitts, Vice admiral, USN and Navy Cross recipient
- Greg LaRocca, former professional baseball player
- Doug Lea, a computer scientist at SUNY Oswego, specialist of concurrent programming and concurrent data structures who made significant contributions to Java
- Ivo John Lederer, diplomatic historian, interned at Fort Ontario 1944-1946.
- Gladys H. Lent-Barndollar (1872–1938), businesswoman and clubwoman
- David Blair McClosky (1902–1988), classical baritone, voice teacher, vocal therapist, and author of two books on vocal technique
- David H. McConnell, founder of California Perfume Company which became Avon Cosmetics
- Edward Nathaniel McDonald, businessman
- Nettie Leila Michel (1863—1912), business woman, author, magazine editor
- Luther W. Mott, former US Congressman
- Robert Natoli, strongman
- D. W. Reeves (1838–1900), composer and bandleader, called "the father of band music in America"
- Dan Reynolds, Nationally published cartoonist, author, and greeting card artist with American Greetings born and raised in Oswego, New York.
- Morgan Robertson, author and self-proclaimed inventor of the periscope, best known for The Wreck of the Titan: Or, Futility.
- Al Roker, national weather anchor on NBC's Today
- Curtis F. Shoup, Medal of Honor recipient
- Carroll Smith, race car driver, author
- Charles Henry Smyth Jr., geologist
- Newcomb Spoor, Wisconsin State Assemblyman
- Bob Steinburg, member North Carolina House of Representatives, 2013 to present
- Peter Stickles, actor
- Willard Dickerman Straight, banker, diplomat, co-founder of The New Republic magazine
- Charles A. Talcott, former US Congressman
- Lois E. Trott (1828–1894), educator and philanthropist
- Mary E. Walker, only female Civil War doctor, and only woman to receive the Medal of Honor
- Leigh Allison Wilson, author
- Julia McNair Wright (1840–1903), writer

== Culture and recreation ==
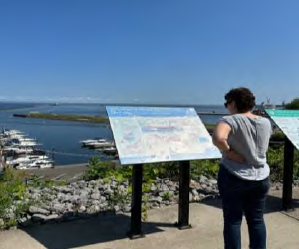
A visitor reads a maritime history sign in Oswego.

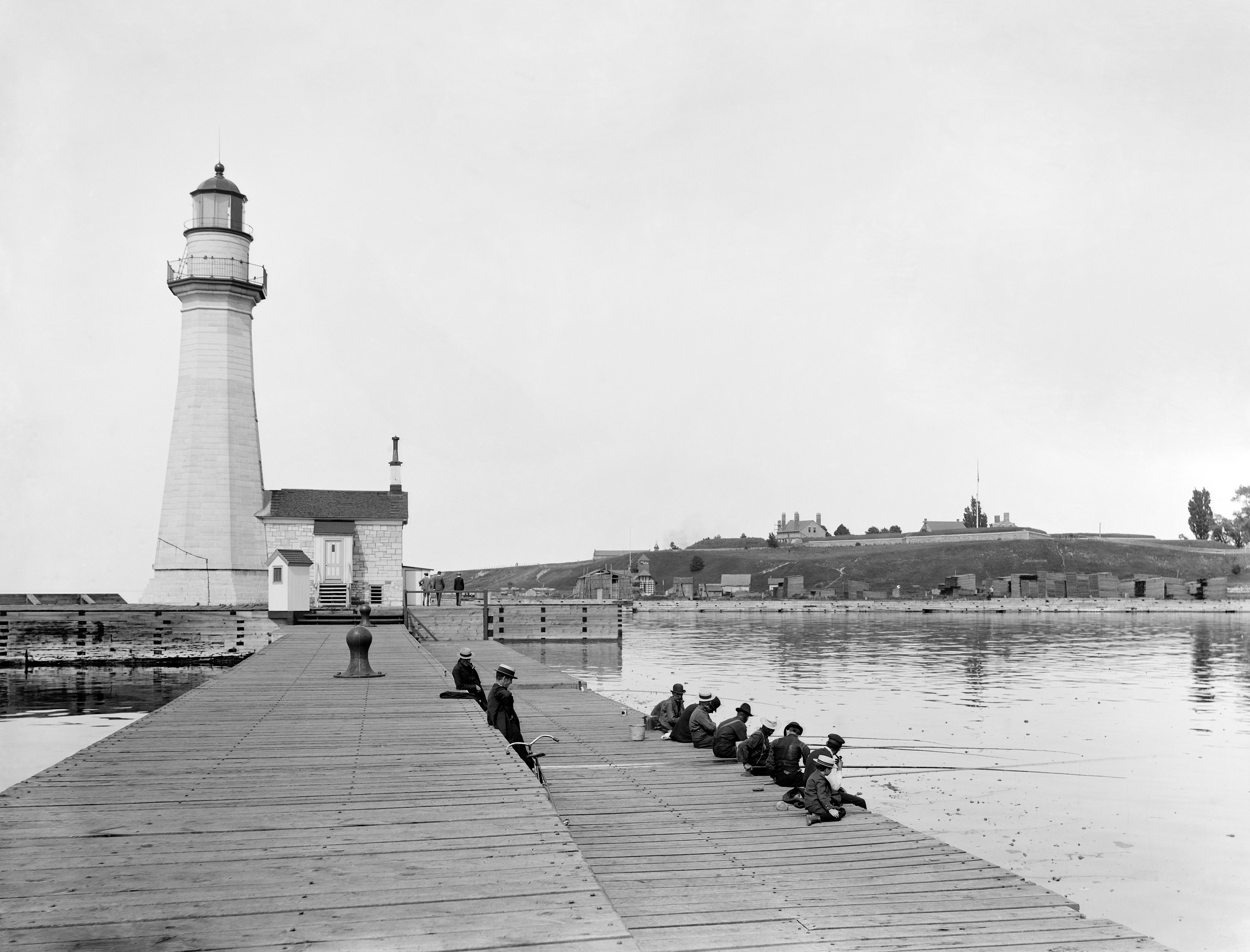
Recreational fishing at Oswego, c. 1900.

Oswego has a long history stretching back to the 15th century. Visitors can learn about the city's history by visiting museums such as the H. Lee White Marine Museum, The Richardson-Bates House, and Fort Ontario. Throughout the city and public parks, many historical monuments can be found honoring historical figures, and other forts that stood in what is now the historical district. The city includes a number of sites on the National Register of Historic Places including the Derrick Boat No. 8, Kingsford Historic District, Market House, Oswego Armory, Oswego City Hall, Oswego City Library, Oswego County Courthouse, Oswego Yacht Club, Tanner Block, and U.S. Customhouse. In September 2024, the Lake Ontario National Marine Sanctuary was designated in the waters of southeastern Lake Ontario off Oswego to protect historic shipwrecks and areas of cultural, historical, and spiritual significance to Native Americans of the Haudenosaunee Confederacy and to preserve them as educational and recreational resources.

The most notable historian was Rosemary Nesbitt, who is immortalized by a monument in the city's signature public park, Breitbeck Park. Every Halloween, she would traditionally let down her long silver hair, dress in a ghostly gown, and tell ghostly haunted tales spanning across the entire history of the city. Nesbitt, who also founded the Marine Museum and wrote various books about the city's history, died on August 2, 2009, at the age of 84.

Ludwig Bemelmans, a writer best known for his popular 'Madeline' stories, was stationed at Fort Ontario, Oswego, N.Y. from 1917. From this experience he wrote the book "My war with the United States" published in 1937.

Boating, fishing, and hiking are also activities that are enjoyed by residents and visitors. Oswego also has three ice-skating rinks, a large public pool located on the Fort Ontario grounds, bowling, and the historic Oswego Theater.

Oswego is home to Oswego Harborfest, an annual admission-free admission festival that draws approximately 150,000 visitors over four days. The festival officially traces its roots back to 1987, when Oswego City Historian Rosemary Nesbitt organized a small, historically-themed waterfront gathering called "Oswegofest" to celebrate the city's maritime history. In 1988, the event expanded and was renamed Oswego Harborfest under the direction of a newly formed non-profit board, growing to include major musical entertainment and a massive fireworks display.

In 2007, SUNY Oswego Lakers men's hockey team won the NCAA Division III Ice Hockey Championship. Garren Reisweber's goal 12:55 into overtime gave Oswego State a 4–3 win over Middlebury on March 18, 2007. The Lakers captured the school's first ever national championship in a team sport. The 2006–07 season marked the first season Oswego played in the newly built, state-of-the-art Marano Campus Center, located on Lake Ontario. The Campus Center replaced Romney Field House Ice Rink which opened in 1962, and is believed to be the first ice rink built within the State University of New York system. The old ice rink was transformed into a multi-use indoor facility for track, lacrosse and other intramural sports.

From 2005 to 2006 the Oswego Admirals of the Ontario Junior Hockey League played in the old ice rink.

== Media ==
The city is served by The Palladium Times newspaper, Oswego County Today, the student-run newspaper The Oswegonian, as well as OswegoNYlion and is the home to the radio stations WRVO, WSGO, WNYO and WMVN. Oswego also has its own television station, WTOP, which is completely student-run at the State University of New York at Oswego, and is served by the Oswego High School television station, WBUC. Oswego is served by the Syracuse TV market. Previous media included the Oswego Daily News.

== Education ==
The city is part of the Oswego City School District. The Oswego City School district has one high school (grades 9–12), one middle school (grades 7 and 8) and five elementary schools (grades K–6).

Trinity Catholic School (formerly St. Paul's Academy) provides classes for PreK–6. Oswego Community Christian School provides classes for PreK–8.

The State University of New York at Oswego (SUNY Oswego) has portions of its property in Oswego City, with the rest just west of the city in the Town of Oswego.

== Electric power facilities ==
=== Oswego generating station ===
Pursuant to Section 70 of the Public Service Law, NRG Energy, Inc. (now operating as NRG Power Marketing LLC) officially received ownership of the Oswego generating station from previous owners Niagara Mohawk Power Corporation and Rochester Gas and Electric in 1999. NRG was the lowest bidder in an auction arranged by Niagara Mohawk. The facility is a 1,803-megawatt (MW) (nameplate) plant with two steam turbines powered by steam heated in boilers from fuel oil (although one of the units has natural gas listed as a backup fuel). The facility went into service in 1976 (for unit 5) and 1980 (for unit 6). In 2017, it injected 39.7 GWh of electric energy into the electric transmission system. This is equivalent to operating at full capacity for approximately 0.3% of the year. For comparison, the central region consumed 15,819 GWh of electric energy in 2017. Its power is sold into the electric wholesale market administered by the NYISO. Since the plant does not produce much electric energy on an annual basis, it is fair to assume that most of its revenue comes from the NYISO's capacity market. For example, at 1.0 ($/kW - Month), the plant would receive annual revenue of $21.6 million from the capacity market without accounting for actual energy production.

According to the New York State Public Service Commission's database management system, DMM, there was a whistle blower complaint filed against the facility (case no. 92-E-0306) in 1992, however, the DMM website for that case number says its contents were moved to the DMM website for case number 92-M-0016. As of November 2018, there are 5 orders on the DMM case number 92-M-0016 website, none of which have to do with a whistle blower complaint against Oswego generating station.
