= Curtis F. Shoup =

- Born: January 11, 1921; Napenoch, New York, US
- Died: January 7, 1945 (aged 23) near Sainte-Ode, Belgium
- Burial place: North Scriba Union Cemetery, Scriba, New York
- Military career
- Allegiance: United States of America
- Branch: United States Army
- Service years: 1942–1945
- Rank: Staff Sergeant
- Units: 346th Infantry, 87th Infantry Division
- Conflicts: World War II
- Awards: Medal of Honor; Bronze Star; Purple Heart; Military Medal (United Kingdom); Croix de Guerre (Belgium); Order of Léopold (Belgium); Combat Infantryman Badge

Curtis F. Shoup (January 11, 1921 – January 7, 1945) was an American soldier who received the Medal of Honor for acts of bravery near Tillet in Belgium (now a deelgemeente of Sainte-Ode) on January 7, 1945. He was a graduate of Oswego High School in Oswego, New York. He is buried in North Scriba Union Cemetery in Scriba, New York and his grave can be found in Lot 290, which is in the 3rd row from the entrance driveway, 14th headstone from the public highway (North Road, also known as County Route 1). GPS coordinates: Datum WGS84, 43° 29' 18.9" N, 76° 23' 30.5" W

Shoup joined the army from Buffalo, New York in August 1942.

== Medal of Honor citation ==
Staff Sergeant, U.S. Army, Company I, 346th Infantry, 87th Infantry Division. Entered service at: Buffalo, NY Birth: Napenoch, N.Y. Place and date: Near Tillet, Belgium, January 7, 1945. G.O. No.: 60, July 25, 1945.

Citation:

On January 7, 1945, near Tillet, Belgium, his company attacked German troops on rising ground. Intense hostile machinegun fire pinned down and threatened to annihilate the American unit in an exposed position where frozen ground made it impossible to dig in for protection. Heavy mortar and artillery fire from enemy batteries was added to the storm of destruction falling on the Americans. Realizing that the machinegun must be silenced at all costs, S/Sgt. Shoup, armed with an automatic rifle, crawled to within 75 yards of the enemy emplacement. He found that his fire was ineffective from this position, and completely disregarding his own safety, stood up and grimly strode ahead into the murderous stream of bullets, firing his low-held weapon as he went. He was hit several times and finally was knocked to the ground. But he struggled to his feet and staggered forward until close enough to hurl a grenade, wiping out the enemy machinegun nest with his dying action. By his heroism, fearless determination, and supreme sacrifice, S/Sgt. Shoup eliminated a hostile weapon which threatened to destroy his company and turned a desperate situation into victory.

== Namesake ==
The USNS Sgt. Curtis F. Shoup (T-AG-175) was named in his honor.

== See also ==
- List of Medal of Honor recipients
- List of Medal of Honor recipients for World War II
