= Robert M. Hensel =

American record-holder and activist

Robert Michael Hensel (born May 8, 1969) was born with the birth defect known as Spina bifida. He is also a Guinness World Records holder for the longest non-stop wheelie in a wheelchair, covering a total distance of 6.178 miles. As part of setting his record, he raised money for wheelchair ramps throughout Oswego, New York, his hometown.

In 2000, realizing the need to focus more on one's abilities and less on their disabilities, Hensel sought to have a week designated that would bring to light the many talents and accomplishments being made by individuals with disabilities. Due to his efforts, Oswego County passed a motion that year recognizing Oct. 1-7 as Beyond Limitations week.

== Awards and honors ==
- State of New York Executive Chamber Certificate of Commendation
- Guinness World Record Holder
- Spokesperson for Athletes for Hope
- 2008 Go Fast Sports & Beverage Athlete
