= Gustav Hensel =

German footballer

Personal information
- Date of birth: 23 October 1884
- Date of death: 29 August 1933 (aged 48)
- Position: Forward

Senior career*
| Years | Team | Apps | (Gls) |
- Casseler FV

International career
| 1908 | Germany | 1 | (0) |
- * Club domestic league appearances and goals

Gustav Hensel (23 October 1884 – 29 August 1933) was a German international footballer.
