= Paddy Doyle (Dublin hurler) =

Irish hurler

Personal information
- Native name: Pádraig Ó Dúghaill (Irish)
- Born: 2003 (age 22–23) Kilbarrack, Dublin, Ireland
- Occupation: Student

Sport
- Sport: Hurling
- Position: Right wing-back
Club
- Years: Club
- Naomh Barróg
Club titles
- Dublin titles: 0
College
- Years: College
- 2022-present: DCU Dóchas Éireann
College titles
- Fitzgibbon titles: 0
Inter-county
- Years: County
- 2023-present: Dublin
Inter-county titles
- Leinster titles: 0
- All-Irelands: 0
- NHL: 0
- All Stars: 0

Patrick Doyle (born 2003) is an Irish hurler. At club level, he plays with Naomh Barróg and at inter-county level with the Dublin senior hurling team.

== Career ==
As a secondary school student, Doyle earned selection to the Dublin North Schools amalgamation team in the Leinster PPS SAHC. He later lined out with the DCU Dóchas Éireann team in the Fitzgibbon Cup. At club level, Doyle plays with Naomh Barróg.

Doyle first appeared on the inter-county scene for Dublin as a member of the minor team in 2019. He later progressed to the under-20 team. Doyle made his senior team debut in 2023 and ended the season by being named Dublin's Young Hurler of the Year.
