= A Woman of the Century =

1893 biographical work about women

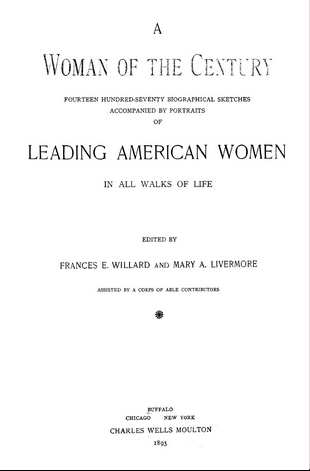
- frontispiece
- Editor: Frances E. Willard and Mary A. Livermore
- Language: English
- Subject: American women's biographies
- Published: 1893
- Publisher: Charles Wells Moulton
- Publication place: United States
- Media type: Print
- Pages: 830

A Woman of the Century: Fourteen Hundred Seventy Biographical Sketches, Accompanied by Portraits of Leading American Women, in all Walks of Life is a compendium of biographical sketches of American women. It was published in 1893 by Charles Wells Moulton. The editors, Frances E. Willard and Mary A. Livermore, were assisted by a group of contributors.

The biographical dictionary had 830 pages measuring 8 by 11 inches (200 mm × 280 mm). It was printed from a full-face brevier type on heavy paper. The typography was by Charles Wells Moulton, the engravings and electrotypes by the Buffalo Electrotype and Engraving Company, the press work by the Kittinger Printing Company, the paper by the S. Worthington Paper Company, and the binding by Wm. H. Bork. The work contained 1,470 biographies, and 1,330 engravings.

== Overview ==
The publication of A Woman of the Century was undertaken to create a biographical record of notable 19th-century women. It included biographies of women considered noteworthy because of their actions in the church, at the bar, in literature and music, in art, drama, science and invention or in social and political reform philanthropy. It was noted that the title was incorrect as it mostly included women from the late 19th century. Sarah Josepha Hale had created a similar work in 1853 titled Woman's Record: Sketches of All Distinguished Women, from the Creation to A.D. 1854. That work was not limited to 19th century American women but did include 2,500 biographies, with an index running for twenty pages.

== Biographies ==
The biographies in this work were intended to include all facts worth mentioning to create an educational record of the lives of American 19th century women. They were meant to include "the secret of her success", how the women had progressed and their ideas. The editors intended that the book would entertain and educate the readers about important women and their role in America's history. More than half of the entries are of women who had either never married or had become widowed at a young age and did not remarry.

The biographical sketches are accompanied by thirteen hundred half-tone engravings, made from photographs.
