= Charles Wells Moulton =

American poet, critic, editor, and publisher

- Born: 1859
- Died: March 17, 1913 (aged 53–54); Buffalo, New York, US
- Occupations: Poet, critic, editor, and publisher
- Notable work: The Magazine of Poetry and Literary Review and A Woman of the Century

Charles Wells Moulton (/ˈmoʊltən/; 1859 – March 17, 1913) was an American poet, critic, editor, and publisher. He was the founding editor of The Magazine of Poetry and Literary Review, and the publisher of A Woman of the Century (1893).

== Early life ==
Moulton was one of the sons of Byron Moulton, a prominent bridge builder and sheep breeder in New York State.

== Career ==
Moulton was the founding editor of The Magazine of Poetry and Literary Review, and the publisher of A Woman of the Century (1893). He also compiled a collection of poems about women, In My Lady's Name (1896), and a series of publications called The Doctor's Recreation Series, beginning in 1904. As a publisher and editor, Moulton worked with many women writers, including Lucy H. Washington, Hester A. Benedict and Florence Paillou,

== Personal life ==
Moulton died in Buffalo, New York, in 1913, at age 53, from heart disease.
