= Paddy Doyle (athlete) =

British sportsman

Paddy Doyle is an English athlete. The 2009 edition of the Guinness Book of World Records recognised him as "The World Fitness Endurance Champion".

== Personal history ==
Doyle was a member of the British Parachute Regiment and was discharged in 1986. Doyle has 49 entries and re-entries in the 1990–2008 Guinness Book of World Records.

== Records ==
- World Fitness Endurance Champion, 2009
- 1,500,230 press-ups in one year
- 716 step ups in an hour, 2006
- World's fittest man, 2004
