= New York State Route 264 =

State highway in Oswego County, New York, US

New York State Route 264
- Map of Oswego County and vicinity with NY 264 highlighted in red

Route information
- Maintained by NYSDOT
- Length: 8.65 mi (13.92 km)
- Existed: c. 1932–present

Major junctions
- South end: CR 57 in Phoenix
- NY 481 near Phoenix
- North end: NY 3 in Palermo

Location
- Country: United States
- State: New York
- Counties: Oswego

Highway system
- New York Highways; Interstate; US; State; Reference; Parkways
← NY 263	→ NY 265

New York State Route 264 (NY 264) is a north–south state highway located within Oswego County, New York, in the United States. It runs for 8.65 miles (13.92 km) from an intersection with County Route 57 (CR 57, formerly NY 57) in the village of Phoenix to a junction with NY 3 in the town of Palermo. The southernmost portion of NY 264 serves as a connector between Phoenix and NY 481, which bypasses the village to the northeast. When NY 264 was assigned in the early 1930s, it originally served the hamlet of Pennellville, located midway between Phoenix and Palermo. The route was altered to bypass the community later in the decade.

== Route description ==
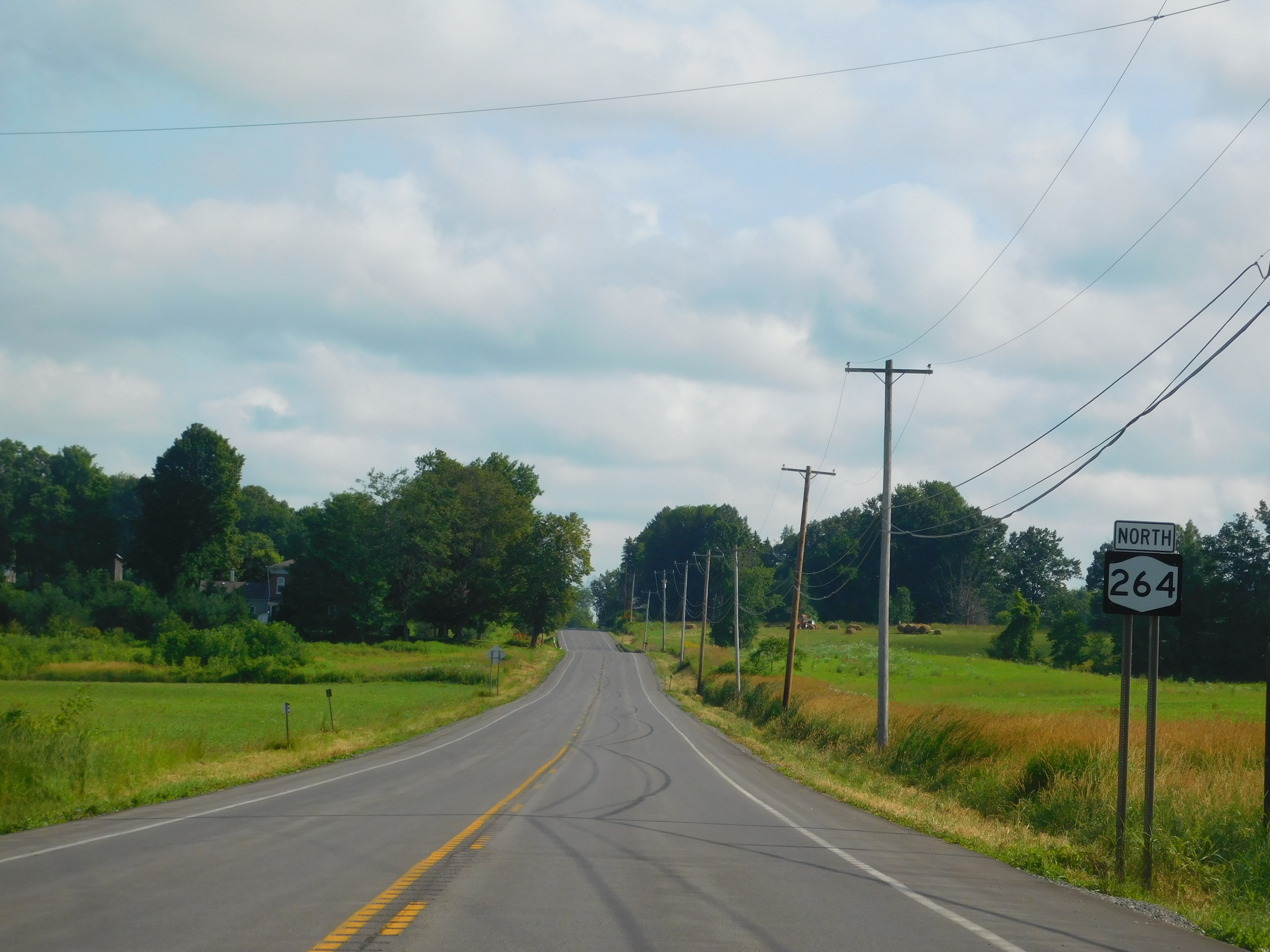
NY 264 northbound in Palermo

NY 264 begins at an intersection with CR 57 (Main Street; formerly NY 57) in the village of Phoenix, located in the town of Schroeppel. The route proceeds north through the village as a two-lane road named Volney Street, passing several blocks of homes before crossing CSX Transportation's Baldwinsville Subdivision rail line. Past the railroad, NY 264 leaves the Phoenix village limits, taking on a northwesterly alignment as it continues through a lightly populated area of the town of Schroeppel as an unnamed road. NY 481 approaches NY 264 from the southeast, and the freeway loosely parallels the surface road as NY 264 intersects the eastern terminus of CR 59. Not far to the north, the route enters an interchange with NY 481 (exit 14) and meets the nearby southern terminus of CR 6.

Past the exit, NY 264 turns northeastward away from the freeway to serve less developed areas of Schroeppel. The highway winds its way past a mixture of cultivated fields and forested areas, passing the south end of CR 54 and crossing over Sixmile Creek on its way to a small cluster of homes near the northern town line. Here, NY 264 connects to Godfrey Road, a local highway leading southeast to CR 54 in the hamlet of Pennellville. The route climbs a hill as it crosses into the town of Palermo and the hamlet of Suttons Corner, located at the junction of NY 264 and NY 49. From Suttons Corner, the route heads generally north-northeastward across along another sparsely populated stretch to a junction with NY 3 south of the hamlet of Palermo. NY 264 ends here while NY 3 continues north on NY 264's right-of-way toward Palermo.

== History ==
The north–south highway between Phoenix and Palermo was acquired by the state of New York in stages over the course of the early 20th century. The first section to become a state highway was a 2-mile (3.2 km) portion leading north from the Phoenix village limits in Schroeppel, which became state-maintained on November 20, 1909. Its continuation south to Main Street in Phoenix was added to the state highway system on December 12, 1914. The remainder of the highway in Schroeppel was taken over by the state on September 13, 1916. At the time, the highway veered eastward to serve the hamlet of Pennellville. Lastly, the part in Palermo was accepted into the state highway system on October 14, 1922. Although each segment of the Phoenix–Palermo state highway had an unsigned inventory number, the road did not have a posted route number.

Unlike hundreds of through state roads without a signed designation, the Phoenix–Palermo state highway did not receive a number as part of the 1930 renumbering of state highways in New York. It was finally designated as NY 264 c. 1932. The route continued to pass through Pennellville until c. 1938, when it was moved onto a new highway bypassing the hamlet to the west. The southern half of NY 264's former routing became an extension of CR 54, which originally began at NY 264 in the center of Pennellville. North of the hamlet, the old route is now a town-maintained road named Godfrey Road. NY 264's alignment has not been changed since that time.

== Major intersections ==
The entire route is in Oswego County.

Location	mi	km	Destinations	Notes
Phoenix	0.00	0.00	CR 57 (Main Street)	Southern terminus, formerly NY 57
Schroeppel	1.46	2.35	NY 481 – North Syracuse, Syracuse, Fulton, Oswego	Exit 14 (NY 481)
Palermo	6.76	10.88	NY 49 – Fulton, Central Square	Hamlet of Suttons Corner
Palermo	8.65	13.92	NY 3 – Fulton, Mexico	Northern terminus; hamlet of Loomis Corner
1.000 mi = 1.609 km; 1.000 km = 0.621 mi
