= Interstate 481 =

Highway in New York

Interstate 481
- Map of Syracuse, New York with I-481 highlighted in red

Route information
- Auxiliary route of I-81
- Maintained by NYSDOT
- Length: 15.04 mi (24.20 km)
- Existed: January 1, 1970–September 22, 2026
- NHS: Entire route

Major junctions
- South end: I-81 in Syracuse
- I-690 in East Syracuse; I-90 Toll / New York Thruway in DeWitt
- North end: I-81 / NY 481 in North Syracuse

Location
- Country: United States
- State: New York
- Counties: Onondaga

Highway system
- Interstate Highway System; Main; Auxiliary; Suffixed; Business; Future; New York Highways; Interstate; US; State; Reference; Parkways
← I-478	→ NY 481
← NY 280	I-281	→ NY 281

Interstate 481 (I-481) was an auxiliary Interstate Highway that served as an eastern bypass of Syracuse, New York, US. It split off from its parent route, I-81, in the southern reaches of Syracuse and curved east, north and finally west through the Syracuse suburbs of Jamesville, DeWitt and Cicero before terminating at its northern interchange with I-81 near North Syracuse. (New York State Route 481 (NY 481) continues as a divided expressway northwest to Clay, Phoenix and Fulton and then predominantly as a two-lane highway to Oswego.) I-481 was part of the Veterans Memorial Highway, which extends northward onto NY 481. I-481 was decommissioned by a reroute of I-81 onto the freeway in 2026.

== Route description ==
I-481 began at I-81's exit 16A (now exit 81), a directional T interchange in the South Valley section of the city of Syracuse. Immediately crossing under NY 173, I-481 proceeded eastward alongside Rock Cut Road (unsigned County Route 103 [CR 103]), which meets the freeway at exit 1 (now I-81 exit 82) heading east. I-481 crossed out of Syracuse and into the town of Onondaga, paralleling Rock Cut Road into Clark Reservation State Park. The Interstate Highway makes a bend to the northeast, crossing over tracks used by the New York, Susquehanna and Western Railway and entering exit 2 (now I-81 exit 84), which connects to Jamesville Road (CR 7).

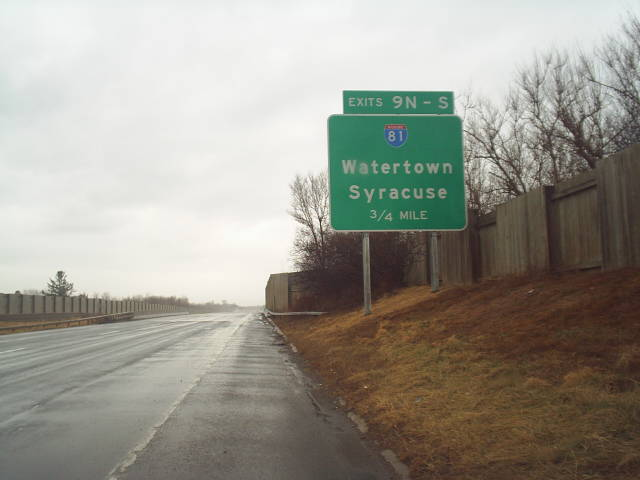
I-481 northbound nearing I-81 in North Syracuse

After exit 2 (now I-81 exit 84), I-481 made a bend to the north, crossing east of Butternut Creek Golf Course as it crossed into the town of DeWitt. In DeWitt, I-481 entered an interchange (exit 3, now I-81 exit 86) with NY 5 and NY 92 (East Genesee Street) just west of the hamlet of Lyndon. After the junction, I-481 continued bending to the northeast, crossing the west end of Old Erie Canal State Park and east of White Chapel Memory Gardens before entering exit 4 (now I-81 exit 88), a large interchange with the eastern terminus of I-690. Just north of the interchange, I-481 crossed over NY 290 (Manlius Center Road) and CSX Transportation's DeWitt Yard. A short distance after the railroad, I-481 entered exit 5 (now I-81 exit 89), which connects to Kirkville Road (CR 53).

After the interchange with CR 53, I-481 continued northward through DeWitt, paralleling Fly Road (CR 77). A short distance later, I-481 crossed over the New York State Thruway (I-90) and enters exit 6 (now I-81 exit 90), a trumpet interchange leading to exit 34A of the Thruway. A short distance after the Thruway, I-481 entered exit 7 (now I-81 exit 91), a partial cloverleaf interchange with NY 298 (Collamer Road). The freeway continues northeast, crossing over East Taft Road (CR 18) in DeWitt before bending northwest into the town of Cicero. In Cicero, I-481 entered an interchange (exit 7, now I-81 exit 95) with Northern Boulevard (CR 82). A short distance to the west in the town of North Syracuse, I-481 entered exit 9 (now I-81 exit 96), a cloverleaf interchange with exit 11 on I-81 (now I-81 Bus). At this junction, the designation of I-481 ended while NY 481 continues northwestward toward Oswego.

== History ==
What was I-481 was originally proposed as parts of two separate highways bypassing the city of Syracuse. From the New York State Thruway (I-90) in DeWitt southwest to I-81 in the south end of Syracuse, the highway was originally designated as I-281. North of the thruway, modern I-481 was initially part of "Relocated Route 57", a proposed limited-access highway extending from NY 57 in Fulton to the thruway in DeWitt via North Syracuse. All of I-281 and the segment of Relocated Route 57 east of I-81 in North Syracuse were redesignated as I-481 on January 1, 1970.

The first section of the highway to be constructed was the portion between Jamesville Road and NY 5. Work on this portion of the freeway began c. 1963 and was completed and opened to traffic by 1965. Construction of I-281, and later I-481, initially progressed northward from NY 5. The segment between Lyndon and I-690 was opened to traffic in the early 1970s, while the piece between I-690 and the thruway was completed by 1977. To the southwest, the section of I-481 from I-81 to Jamesville Road was finished in the early 1980s, finally connecting I-481 to its parent. The last portion of the route from the thruway to I-81 in North Syracuse was completed south of NY 298 by 1985 and finished by 1990.

As part of the demolition and replacement of I-81 through Downtown Syracuse, I-481 was redesignated as I-81, while the previous route of I-81 was redesignated as I-81 Business (I-81 Bus). As part of the project, both interchanges between I-81 and I-481 were reconstructed. The ramps were expanded to carry the increased traffic. Also as part of the project, I-481 was expanded to three lanes each way between exit 4 (now I-81 exit 88) at I-690 and exit 5 (now I-81 exit 89) at Kirkville Road; to three lanes northbound between exit 6 (now I-81 exit 89) and exit 6 (now I-81 exit 90) at I-90; and to three lanes southbound between exit 9 (now I-81 exit 96) at I-81 and exit 8 (now I-81 exit 95) at Northern Boulevard. Construction started in May 2022 and was planned to take five years to complete. However, in May 2021, Governor Andrew Cuomo announced the project would not commence until the following year. At this time, the New York state government allocated $800 million to the "community grid" plan. In preparation for the reconstruction/relocation of I-81 around Syracuse, the American Association of State Highway and Transportation Officials (AASHTO), at its annual Spring Meeting in May 2021, conditionally approved the New York State Department of Transportation (NYSDOT)'s application to reroute I-81 over I-481 around the east side of Syracuse and redesignate I-81 through Syracuse as I-81 Bus, pending concurrence from the Federal Highway Administration (FHWA). The I-481 designation would be eliminated once these route changes have been completed. On September 22, 2026, FHWA formally redesignated I-481 as I-81.

== Exit list ==
Exit numbers follow I-81's future rerouting around Syracuse. The entire route is in Onondaga County.

Location	mi	km	Old exit	New exit	Destinations	Notes
Syracuse	0.00	0.00	–	–	I-81 south – Binghamton	Southern terminus; exit 81 on I-81
Syracuse	0.00	0.00	1	81	To I-81 BL north (Brighton Avenue) – Downtown Syracuse	
Syracuse	0.86	1.38	1	82	Rock Cut Road	Northbound exit and entrance
DeWitt	3.33	5.36	2	84	Jamesville Road – Jamesville	
DeWitt	5.14	8.27	3	86	NY 5 / NY 92 – Fayetteville, DeWitt	Signed as exits 86A (east) and 86B (west) northbound
DeWitt	6.40	10.30	4	88	I-690 west – Syracuse, Fairgrounds	Left exit northbound; Eastern terminus of I-690
DeWitt	8.32	13.39	5	89	Kirkville Road	Signed as exits 89A (east) and 89B (west)
DeWitt	9.45	15.21	6	90	I-90 Toll / New York Thruway – Albany, Buffalo	Exit 34A on I-90 / Thruway
DeWitt	10.20	16.42	7	91	NY 298 – Bridgeport	
Cicero	13.48	21.69	8	95	Northern Boulevard	
Cicero	15.08	24.27	9	96	NY 481 north to I-81 BL south – Syracuse, Oswego	
Cicero	15.08	24.27			I-81 north – Watertown	Northern terminus; exit 96 on I-81
1.000 mi = 1.609 km; 1.000 km = 0.621 mi: Electronic toll collection; Incomplete access

== See also ==
- New York State Route 481
