= John Glenn Boulevard =

Major road in the Syracuse, NY area

- County Route 81

Route information
- Maintained by Onondaga County Highway Department
- Length: 4.11 mi (6.61 km)

Major junctions
- West end: I-690 in Geddes
- East end: Buckley Road in Clay

Location
- Country: United States
- State: New York
- County: Onondaga

Highway system
- County routes in New York; County Routes in Onondaga County

John Glenn Boulevard is an arterial road serving the northwestern suburbs of Syracuse, New York, mainly Liverpool, Baldwinsville, and Clay. As currently constructed, it extends 4.11 miles (6.61 km) from Interstate 690 (I-690) in Geddes to Buckley Road in Clay entirely in Onondaga County. The road is officially designated as the unsigned County Route 81 (CR 81).

== Route description ==
John Glenn Boulevard begins at a modified directional T interchange with I-690 in Geddes. The westbound lanes also include a ramp to the northbound of New York State Route 48 (NY 48), which also terminates at the intersection with I-690. Heading eastbound, the boulevard has a railroad crossing before reaching an at-grade intersection with Farrell Road roughly half a mile later.

For the remainder of the roadway, John Glenn Boulevard passes over the Onondaga Lake connector to the Seneca River/Erie Canal and has at-grade intersections with NY 370 and CR 57 (the former NY 57), in addition to a couple of apartment complex entryways, before terminating at Buckley Road (CR 46) in Clay, New York.

Throughout its length, the boulevard is a divided highway and has a speed limit between 40 and 55 miles per hour (64 and 89 km/h), also passing by several suburban neighborhoods, apartment complexes, and industrial complexes.

== History ==
The arterial was originally built in the mid 1960s, connecting several newly-built suburban neighborhoods to NY 57 and the New York State Thruway. It was named after former NASA astronaut and U.S. Senator John Glenn, the first American to orbit the Earth, which he accomplished in 1962. This is notable as the highway indirectly serves a facility that once housed General Electric, which built components for Glenn's spacecraft and others for NASA.

The highway was originally supposed to extend to NY 481 but was never built past Buckley Road.

In 2016, a woman was killed on the highway when a tree fell on top of the SUV in which she was riding. The incident was later deemed a "freak accident".

== Major intersections ==
The entire route is in Onondaga County.

Location	mi	km	Destinations	Notes
Geddes	0.00– 0.38	0.00– 0.61	I-690 to I-90 / NY 48 north	Western terminus; interchange. No eastbound access to NY 48
Geddes	0.54	0.87	Farrell Road / Long Branch Road	
Salina	1.55	2.49	NY 370 – Baldwinsville, Liverpool	
Clay	3.02	4.86	CR 57 (Oswego Road) – Baldwinsville, Liverpool	Formerly NY 57
Clay	4.11	6.61	Buckley Road (CR 46); Blueberry Road	Eastern terminus; road merges onto Buckley Road
1.000 mi = 1.609 km; 1.000 km = 0.621 mi: Incomplete access
