= Interstate 81 Business =

Business route through Syracuse, New York, US

Interstate 81 Business
- Business Loop 81

Route information
- Maintained by NYSDOT
- Length: 11.8 mi (19.0 km)
- Existed: September 22, 2026–present

Major junctions
- South end: I-81 in Syracuse
- I-690 in Syracuse; NY 370 in Syracuse; I-90 Toll / New York Thruway in Salina; NY 481 in Cicero
- North end: I-81 in Cicero

Location
- Country: United States
- State: New York
- County: Onondaga

Highway system
- Interstate Highway System; Main; Auxiliary; Suffixed; Business; Future; New York Highways; Interstate; US; State; Reference; Parkways

Interstate 81 Business (I-81 Bus. or I-81 BL), more commonly known as Business Loop 81 (BL 81), is a business route of I-81 that runs through Syracuse, New York, and some of its northern suburbs.

It replaced the former routing of I-81 through Syracuse, which includes an elevated viaduct built in the late 1950s, as the aging downtown viaduct is replaced by a street-level boulevard. The rest of I-81 Bus./BL 81 will remain a freeway. The mainline I-81 was rerouted outside the city, replacing the former I-481.

When commissioned, I-81 Bus. will be the first Interstate business route for both I-81 and New York state. The new route was designated in 2026 as construction concluded on the northern and southern termini designed to reroute I-81. The viaduct will be demolished around 2027, and Almond Street will be rebuilt to take the I-81 Bus. routing as a boulevard.

== Route description ==
The majority of I-81 Bus./BL 81 will remain a freeway, save for a section in downtown Syracuse that is currently the viaduct but will be converted into a street-level boulevard. Murals will be installed along the retainer walls of the highway, highlighting the city's history and heritage, alongside that of the Onondaga Nation.

I-81 Bus. begins at exit 81 on its parent route in a recently rebuilt interchange near the Southside, Eastside, and Valley neighborhoods of Syracuse. It will then have an immediate exit on East Glenn Street, complete with traffic circles above the highway and other ramps that connect back to I-81. After two exits it is to go underneath a railroad bridge as a pedestrian path from Martin Luther King Boulevard straddles the roadway. I-81 Bus. will then enter a traffic circle with Van Buren Street, then continue north as Almond Street. After 1.5 miles (2.4 km) of street intersections, including one with NY 92, I-81 Bus. will turn left on Erie Boulevard (also known as NY 5) before emerging back into a freeway under I-690. Ramps connecting I-690 westbound to I-81 Bus. northbound and I-81 Bus. southbound and I-690 eastbound will be renovated and maintained, ensuring high-speed access between the highways.

Turning north, the BL 81 freeway will have newly rebuilt interchanges with Court Street, Bear Street (NY 298), and others before a large intersection with NY 370, which becomes the Onondaga Lake Parkway, in addition to other streets serving NBT Bank Stadium and the William F. Walsh Regional Transportation Center. It will then interchange with 7th Street, the New York State Thruway, and US 11 before serving the Syracuse Hancock International Airport.

A few miles north in Cicero, I-81 Bus. has an interchange with NY 481 shortly before merging back with I-81 and ending. The series of interchanges with NY 481 and I-81 was formerly a complete cloverleaf interchange between I-81 and I-481/NY 481 - the latter two highways having once shared the same right-of-way - but has been reconstructed as a three-quarters cloverleaf interchange between BL 81 and NY 481, while I-81 passes by on the northeast corner, serving as the terminus of the two other highways at two respectively separate spots. Like the intersection between I-81 and I-81 Bus. near Southside, this interchange in Cicero has been rebuilt to allow I-81 to flow seamlessly into its new configuration on the decommissioned I-481.

== History ==
=== Original routing of I-81 ===
Top: View of the viaduct from the street in 2025.
Bottom: entering the viaduct in 2025

I-81, first designated in New York State in 1957, was built in several stages and completed for the most part in the mid-1960s. In Syracuse, part of I-81 was built on an elevated highway, intended to make travel from Downtown Syracuse to Syracuse University faster. Extensions of the North Syracuse–Brewerton segment south into Downtown Syracuse (now exit 3B) and north to Parish (now exit 114) were completed c. 1961.

The construction of the I-81 came with much controversy. After the freeway was completed, many neighborhoods were disrupted by the presence of the freeway. One neighborhood in particular, the 15th Ward in Syracuse, was largely replaced by the freeway. This decimated a close-knit Black-American community. The New York Civil Liberties Union states that 1,300 familes were displaced by the viaduct when it was constructed. When the displaced community attempted to disperse out into the city, white residents fled, reducing the population of the city by 30 percent over 60 years, while the population of the county grew 55 percent.

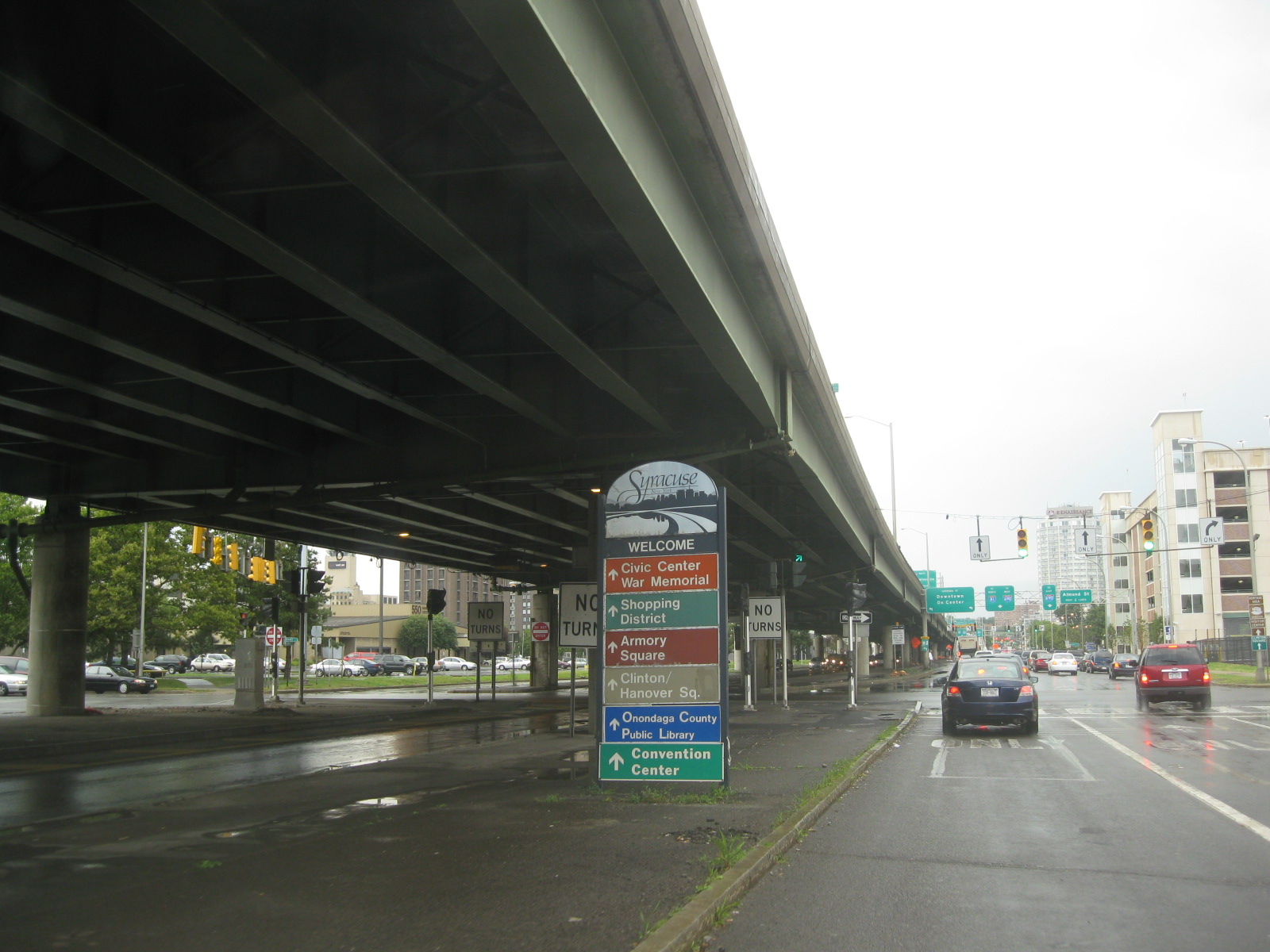
Top: Entrance to the viaduct from Almond Street northbound in 2017.
Bottom: Almond Street southbound in 2025 below the viaduct, prior to demolition

=== Proposal to remove the viaduct ===
Replacing or removing the viaduct was a point of discussion during the 2010s, especially as the viaduct deteriorated while exceeding its expected useful life. After deliberating between three options, including a full rebuild of the viaduct and a "no-build" option, in 2019, the state chose the "community grid" option that would tear down the viaduct and replace it with an urban boulevard complete with traffic circles and stoplights.

=== Reconstruction of highways ===
The I-81 viaduct project, billed as the largest infrastructure project in the NYSDOT's history, began work on phase I in 2023, with $2.25 billion initially allocated to the project by the state. The project also received $180 million federally from the Neighborhood Access and Equity Program in 2024. By 2025, the NYSDOT awarded its fifth contract, which was to prepare the viaduct for closure and demolition, in addition to providing environmental remediations to the downtown community.

The northern intersection reopened in stages in 2025, with two new flyover ramps carrying I-481/future I-81 in its new configuration opening in May and July, respectively. In March 2026, the first stage of the revamped southern interchange between I-81 and I-481 was completed, allowing drivers from I-481/future I-81 southbound to seamlessly connect to I-81 southbound in its new configuration, while new exits and traffic circles connecting to I-81/future BL 81 northbound, as well as Brighton Ave. and East Glen St., were completed earlier that year. Both the north and south interchanges were completed and opened by June.

Construction on a new roadway for BL 81 to reach a new roundabout with Van Buren St. and Almond St. also began that year next to the existing I-81 roadway leading to the viaduct, which is set to be closed and prepared for demoliton once the new approach and roundabout are completed. In addition, Interstate 690 will be widened to accommodate thru-traffic that once used the I-81 viaduct.

On September 23, 2026, governor Kathy Hochul announced that Business Loop 81 had been federally designated and that I-81 had been rerouted onto the former I-481. This was a major milestone before the demolition of the viaduct could commence.

Also in 2026, a contractor for one segment of the project was placed under investigation by the district attorney for alleged misuse of funds.

== Feedback ==
Despite receiving praise from the NYCLU, urban planners and public officials, namely in the plan to redirect heavy traffic outside of downtown, the decision to remove the viaduct and downgrade the full Interstate designation was not without criticism from some in the Syracuse area. Some local residents worried the removal would accelerate gentrification, while many other residents did not have such fears. Some business owners in varying locations worried about a loss of revenue from the changes to vehicle traffic patterns, while many business owners were excited for increased foot traffic.

Others were worried about the release of toxic gases dust during the demolition of the viaduct, with the "Renew 81 for All" group arguing the project's "environmental impacts would exacerbate rather than resolve issues related to environmental racism that the highway already causes." Court challenges to the removal produced only temporary delays. In particular, one ruling that sided with "Renew 81 for All", namely that the environmental study on traffic needed to also take into account the future Micron complex in Cicero, was reversed in 2024 by the state appeals court.

The New York State Department of Transportation held several open houses open to the public in 2025, in addition to running informational booths at the New York State Fair and other festivals in Syracuse, with the aim of educating residents and receiving feedback.

== Exit list ==
The entire route is in Onondaga County.

Location	mi	km	Old exit	New exit	Destinations	Notes
Syracuse	0.00	0.00			I-81 south – Binghamton	Continuation south
Syracuse	0.2	0.32	16A	1A	East Glenn Street I-81 north – Watertown	Left exit southbound; access from I-81 southbound to BL 81 via East Glenn Street from exit 81 to Brighton Avenue; signed as East Glenn Street northbound and as I-81 southbound
Syracuse	0.3– 0.9	0.48– 1.4	17	1B (NB),1C (SB)	East Glen Street, South State Street, South Salina Street, Brighton Avenue	South State Street not signed northbound; access to JMA Wireless Dome
Syracuse	0.6	0.97	—	1C	East Colvin Street	Future northbound exit and entrance; currently under construction
Syracuse	2.8	4.5	18	—	Adams Street, Harrison Street	Access to Oncenter and Syracuse University; exit will be demolished when the elevated highway is downgraded to a boulevard
Syracuse	3.2– 3.5	5.1– 5.6	—	3A	I-690 – East Syracuse, Fairgrounds, Baldwinsville	No southbound access to I-690 west; northbound exit ramp to I-690 east permanently closed November 16, 2026; exit will be remodeled once elevated highway is downgraded to a boulevard
Syracuse	85.25	137.20	19	3B	Clinton Street, Salina Street	Southbound exit and northbound entrance
Syracuse	85.37	137.39	20	—	Franklin Street, West Street	Southbound exit and northbound entrance; exit to permanently close November 2026
Syracuse	85.81	138.10	21	—	Spencer Street, Catawba Street	Former I-81 Southbound exit and entrance; permanently closed December, 20, 2025
Syracuse	85.95	138.32	—	4A	North Clinton Street	Southbound exit and entrance; opened December 20, 2025; replaces the former I-81 exit 21 Spencer Street/Catawba Street exit
Syracuse	86.23– 87.45	138.77– 140.74	22	4B	NY 298 (Bear Street) to I-690 west	I-690 not signed northbound
Syracuse	86.23– 87.45	138.77– 140.74	23	5	Hiawatha Boulevard, Destiny USA Drive	Southbound exit only; signed as exits 5A (Hiawatha) and 5B (Destiny)
Syracuse	86.90	139.85	23–24	5A-C	NY 370 (Park Street, Onondoga Lake Parkway) / Hiawatha Boulevard / Old Liverpool Road – Liverpool	Northbound exit and southbound entrance; signed as exits 5A (NY 370 east), 5B (NY 370 west; closed indefinitely due to truck safety issues at the Onondaga Lake Parkway Bridge), and 5C (Old Liverpool)
Salina	6.6	10.6	25	6	7th North Street – Liverpool	
Salina	7.0	11.3	25A	7	I-90 Toll / New York Thruway – Albany, Buffalo	Exit 36 on I-90 / Thruway
Salina	8.8	14.2	26	8	US 11 – Mattydale	
Salina	9.2	14.8	27	9A	Syracuse Airport	Combined with exit 9B northbound and exit 8 southbound
Cicero	9.9	15.9	28	9B	Taft Road – North Syracuse	
Cicero	11.3	18.2	29	11A-B	I-81 south – Binghamton NY 481 north – Oswego	Exits 96N-S on I-81 and exits 1A-B on NY 481; no access from BL 81 southbound back to I-81; signed as I-81 northbound and NY 481 southbound
Cicero	11.8	19.0			I-81 north – Watertown	Continuation north
1.000 mi = 1.609 km; 1.000 km = 0.621 mi: Concurrency terminus; Electronic toll collection; Incomplete access

== See also ==
- List of business routes of the Interstate Highway System
  - Interstate 80 Business (Sacramento, California), a former alignment of Interstate 80
- West Side Highway, formerly the West Side Elevated Highway
- Inner Loop (Rochester)
- New York State Route 895, formerly Interstate 895
