= Veterans Boulevard =

Veterans Boulevard may refer to:

- Veterans Memorial Boulevard
- Tennessee State Route 449

== See also ==
- Veterans Highway
- Veterans Parkway (disambiguation)
- Vietnam Veterans Memorial Highway (disambiguation)
