= New York State Route 57 =

Former state highway in New York State

New York State Route 57
- Map of the Syracuse area with NY 57 highlighted in red (The portion superseded by NY 931G is backed in blue)

Route information
- Maintained by NYSDOT and the cities of Oswego and Syracuse
- Length: 33.45 mi (53.83 km)
- Existed: 1927–May 1982

Major junctions
- South end: NY 370 in Liverpool
- I-90 Toll / New York Thruway in Liverpool; NY 31 near Baldwinsville; NY 3 / NY 176 in Fulton
- North end: NY 104 in Oswego

Location
- Country: United States
- State: New York
- Counties: Onondaga, Oswego

Highway system
- New York Highways; Interstate; US; State; Reference; Parkways
← NY 56A	→ NY 58

New York State Route 57 (NY 57) was a north–south state highway in the central portion of New York in the United States. It extended for 33.45 miles (53.83 km) from an intersection with U.S. Route 11 (US 11) just north of downtown Syracuse to a junction with NY 104 six blocks from the Lake Ontario shoreline in Oswego. North of Liverpool, NY 57 was routed along the eastern bank of the Seneca and Oswego Rivers. It passed through several riverside communities, including the village of Phoenix and the city of Fulton. The route largely paralleled NY 48, which follows the western bank of the waterway between Van Buren and Oswego via Baldwinsville.

The origins of NY 57 date back to the early 20th century when the New York State Legislature created Route 34, an unsigned legislative route extending from Syracuse to Oswego by way of the future NY 57 corridor. This route became New York State Route 20 in 1924; however, NY 20 was renumbered to NY 57 just three years later. NY 57 remained virtually unchanged for the remainder of its existence. In later years, NY 57 was replaced in purpose by NY 481 south of Fulton, which led to its complete removal in 1982. The county routes that replaced NY 57 south of Fulton still bear the number 57 on signage in both counties, even though the portion of former NY 57 in Onondaga County is officially designated as County Route 91 (CR 91).

== Route description ==
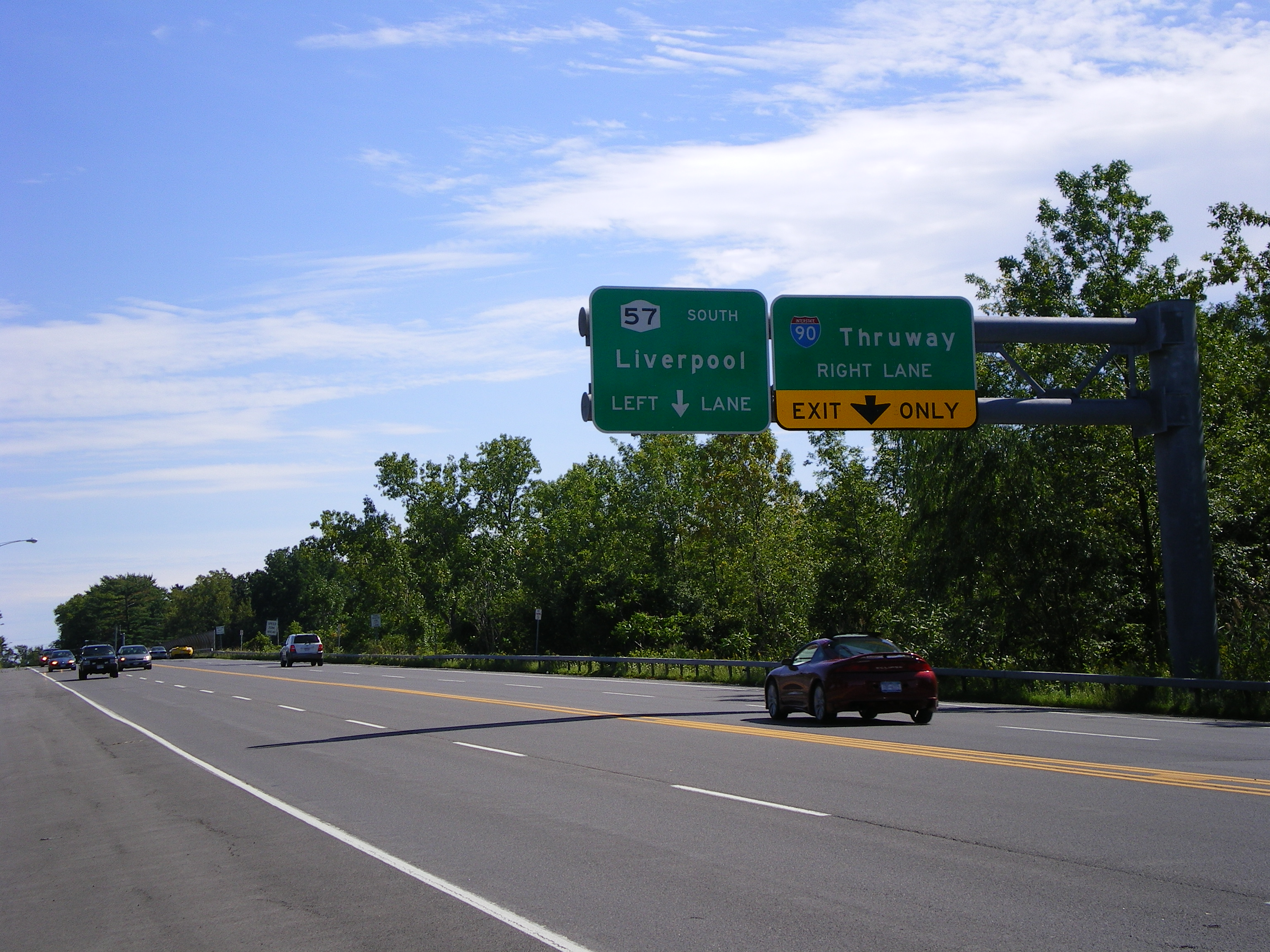
Overhead sign with a NY 57 shield instead of a CR 57 shield on former NY 57 southbound near Liverpool

Maintenance of NY 57 was split between the New York State Department of Transportation (NYSDOT) and the cities of Oswego and Syracuse. In Onondaga County, the route was city-maintained within Syracuse and state-maintained outside of the city. Across the county line in Oswego County, NY 57 was entirely state-maintained save for three blocks in Oswego from Utica Street to Bridge Street (NY 104).

=== Onondaga County ===
NY 57 began adjacent to the southeastern edge of Onondaga Lake at the intersection of Park Street and Wolf Street (US 11) north of downtown Syracuse. The route headed northwest on Park Street, passing through a large interchange on Interstate 81 (I-81) before reaching a smaller interchange with Buckley Road and Old Liverpool Road. NY 57 continued northwest through the interchange, becoming Onondaga Lake Parkway and paralleling both the northeastern edge of Onondaga Lake and the now-CSX Transportation-owned St. Lawrence Subdivision toward the village of Liverpool. Midway up the length of the lake, NY 57 split from the lakeshore and became Oswego Street as it entered the village. Here, NY 57 met the then-eastern terminus of NY 370 and connected with the New York State Thruway (I-90) at exit 38 before leaving the Syracuse area.

Outside of Liverpool, NY 57 headed generally northward past densely populated residential areas in the town of Clay. Here, the route intersected John Glenn Boulevard, a local arterial leading west to I-690. Past John Glenn Boulevard, NY 57 took on a more pronounced northwesterly routing, matching the path of the Seneca River a short distance to the west and the CSX Fulton Subdivision to the east. It continued to run past residential and commercial areas to an area known as Moyers Corners, centered around NY 57's junction with NY 31 east of Baldwinsville. The route continued on, serving gradually less developed areas and turning northward as it approached and eventually crossed the Oneida River to enter Oswego County.

=== Oswego County ===
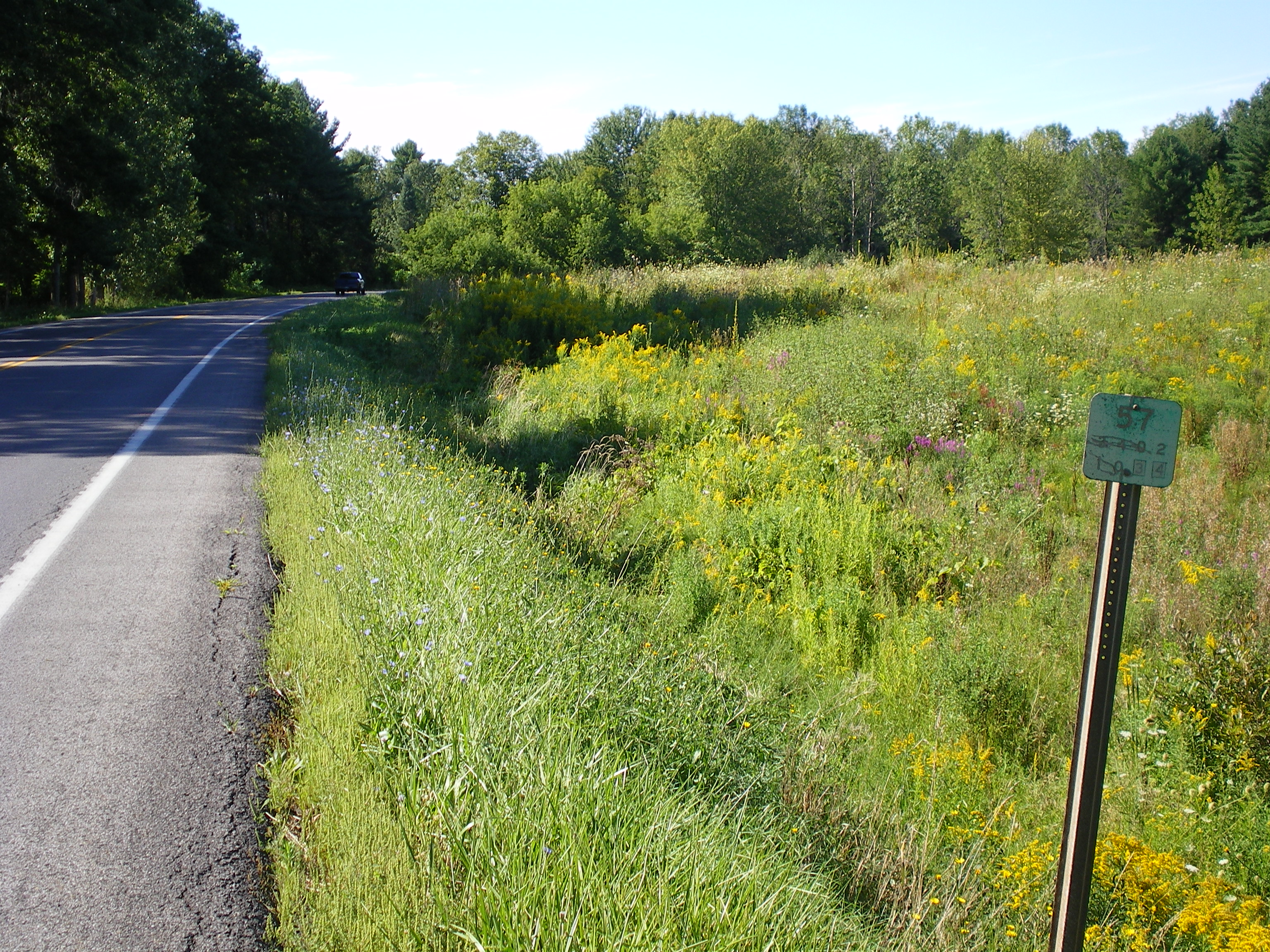
Old reference marker on NY 57's former routing north of Phoenix

Now in the town of Schroeppel, NY 57 progressed northward in the shadow of the Oswego River, the product of the convergence of the Seneca and Oneida rivers. The route passed through sparsely developed parts of the town on its way to the village of Phoenix, where NY 57 met the southern terminus of NY 264. NY 57 proceeded northwest through the small village before heading into another rural section of the county. The open surroundings continued to the outskirts of Fulton, marked by NY 57's intersection with NY 481 south of the city. At the time, NY 481 joined NY 57 northward into Fulton on 4th and 2nd streets before terminating at Broadway (NY 3 and NY 176) in the city's downtown district. NY 57 continued onward on 2nd Street, following the Oswego River and NY 48—its counterpart on the opposite bank—out of the city.

Between Fulton and Oswego, the land surrounding the divided four-lane NY 57 was predominantly rural in nature, with few points of interest along the alignment. North of Fulton, NY 57 passed near the Battle Island State Park, located off of NY 48 on the west bank of the river. In Seneca Hill, a hamlet located midway between Fulton and Oswego and across the river from Minetto, NY 57 met CR 45. The roadway leads to the Minetto Bridge, the only crossing of the Oswego River between Oswego and Fulton. The route continued on a northwest track to Oswego, where NY 57 merged with an older alignment of itself south of the city and became East River Road. At Albany Street, East River Road became East 1st Street, a name the route retained to its terminus at NY 104, once US 104, in downtown Oswego. Although NY 57 ended here, East 1st Street continued northward for a short distance to the Port of Oswego on Lake Ontario.

== History ==
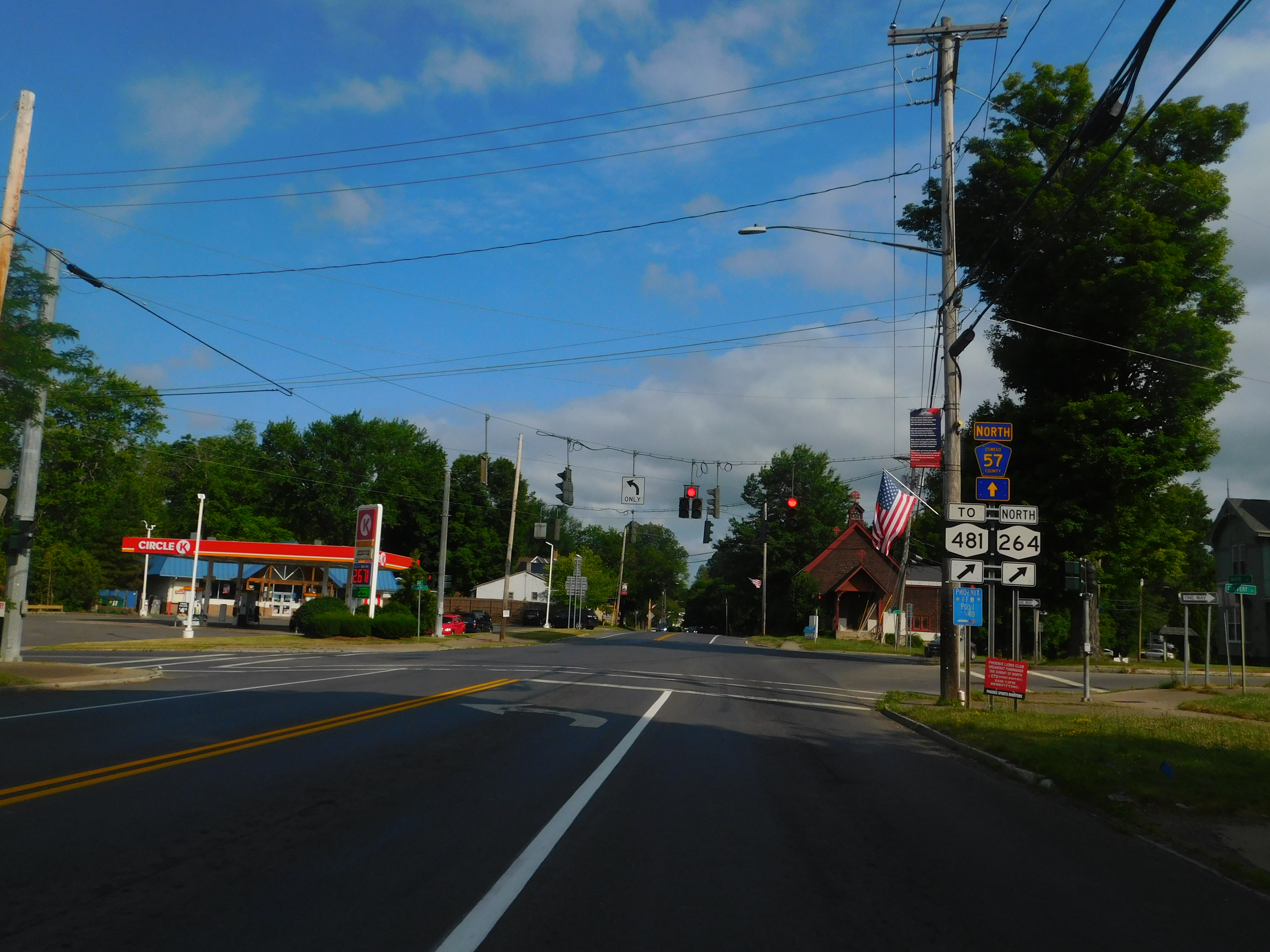
CR 57 (former NY 57) north at NY 264 in Phoenix

The primary north–south roadway connecting Syracuse to Oswego via Fulton on the eastern bank of the Oswego River was originally designated as Route 34, an unsigned legislative route, by the New York State Legislature in 1908. When the first set of posted routes in New York were assigned in 1924, legislative Route 34 was designated as NY 20. NY 20 was redesignated as NY 57 in 1927 to eliminate numerical duplication with the newly designated US 20. The NY 57 corridor remained unchanged until the late 1950s when construction began on a new roadway to replace the existing two-lane, curvy routing of NY 57 between Fulton and Oswego. It was completed by 1960.The former routing of NY 57 between Fulton and Oswego became CR 57.

In the mid-1960s, construction began on a limited-access highway linking Fulton to I-81 in North Syracuse. The under-construction highway, initially known as "Relocated Route 57", was designated as NY 481 on January 1, 1970. The NY 481 designation also extended north to NY 3 in Fulton by way of a short overlap with NY 57. The expressway was completed in the early 1970s, largely replacing NY 57 as the primary roadway between Fulton and Syracuse. NY 57 and NY 481 continued to coexist until May 1982, when the NY 57 designation was eliminated. All of former NY 57 north of Fulton became part of an extended NY 481 while the portion of NY 57's former alignment east of Liverpool became an extension of NY 370. The short piece of former NY 57 in Liverpool between Tulip Street and NY 370 became NY 931G, an unsigned reference route.

The remainder of former NY 57 between Tulip Street in Liverpool and NY 481 south of Fulton was turned over to Oswego and Onondaga counties and became county routes. In Oswego County, the old alignment of NY 57 south of Fulton became a southern extension of CR 57. In Onondaga County, the former routing of NY 57 was designated as CR 91; however, it is signed as CR 57 in homage to the state route that preceded it. The actual Onondaga CR 57 is concurrent with a part of NY 173 in Camillus. Many reference markers for NY 57 are still intact along its former routing from Liverpool to Fulton. CR 57 continues to serve as a major thoroughfare today, serving the various rural communities on the route, and a Centro bus route follows the highway multiple times each day.

== Major intersections ==
County	Location	mi	km	Destinations	Notes
Onondaga	Syracuse	0.00	0.00	US 11	
Onondaga	Syracuse	1.02	1.64	I-81	Exit 23 (I-81)
Onondaga	Liverpool	3.10	4.99	NY 370	Eastern terminus of NY 370
Onondaga	Liverpool	4.02	6.47	I-90 Toll / New York Thruway	Exit 38 (I-90 / Thruway)
Onondaga	Clay	9.59	15.43	NY 31	
Oswego	Phoenix	13.73	22.10	NY 264	Southern terminus of NY 264
Oswego	Fulton	21.15	34.04	NY 481 south	Southern terminus of NY 57 / NY 481 overlap
Oswego	Fulton	22.28	35.86	NY 3 / NY 176 / NY 481	Northern terminus of NY 57 / NY 481 overlap; northern terminus of NY 481
Oswego	Oswego	33.45	53.83	NY 104	
1.000 mi = 1.609 km; 1.000 km = 0.621 mi: Concurrency terminus

== See also ==
- List of county routes in Onondaga County, New York
- List of county routes in Oswego County, New York
