= Pennellville =

Pennellville may refer to:

- Pennellville, New York
- Pennellville Historic District - Brunswick, Maine
