= New York State Route 20 =

New York State Route 20 may refer to:

- New York State Route 20 (1924–1927) in Central New York
- U.S. Route 20 in New York, the only route numbered "20" in New York since 1926
