= Veterans Memorial Highway =

Veterans Memorial Highway is the name chosen for the following roads:

== Canada ==
=== Alberta ===
- Highway 36

=== British Columbia ===
- Part of Highway 14

=== Newfoundland and Labrador ===
- Route 75

=== New Brunswick ===
- Part of Route 15

=== Nova Scotia ===
- Part of Highway 102

=== Ontario ===
- Highway 416
- Highway 420 (Niagara Veterans Memorial Highway)
- Veterans Memorial Parkway

=== Prince Edward Island ===
- Route 2

=== Saskatchewan ===
- Part of Highway 2

== United States ==
- I-15 in parts of Arizona Utah, and Idaho
- Interstate H-2 in Oahu, Hawaii
- US 30 in East Liverpool, Ohio
- County Road 476B (Sumter County, Florida)
- New Jersey Route 55
- New Mexico State Road 599
- West Virginia Route 7 east of Morgantown, West Virginia
- APD-40 in Cleveland, Tennessee
- Veterans Memorial Parkway, East Providence, Rhode Island
- Kentucky Route 259 and Kentucky Route 101 in Edmonson County, Kentucky

=== Georgia ===
- US 25, US 301, Georgia State Route 67 Bypass (Statesboro), and Georgia State Route 73 Bypass (Statesboro)
- US 78 connecting Villa Rica, Winston, Douglasville, Lithia Springs, and Mableton
- Veterans Parkway (Savannah, Georgia)

=== Michigan ===
Multiple separate highways in Michigan each bear the designation "Veterans Memorial Highway", "Veterans Memorial Freeway", "Veterans Memorial Drive" or "Veterans Memorial Parkway":

- I-69 between the eastern city limit of Flint and the western city limit of Port Huron
- US 10 between Ludington and Scottville
- US 23 in Bay City
- US 127 Business in Ithaca
- M-28 between Wakefield and the Ishpeming–Negaunee city line
- M-32 in Alpena
- M-33 between Rose City and Mio
- M-59 between Pontiac and Utica
- M-120 in Muskegon
- M-125 in Monroe County

=== Nevada ===
- US 93 Business from SR 173 to Railroad Pass Casino Road, the former route of US 93, US 95, and US 466
- US 95 in parts of Nevada, excluding the I-80 concurrency
- SR 173, the former route of US 95
- SR 599 and US 95 Business, the former route of US 95 in Las Vegas
- Railroad Pass Casino Road from US 93 Business to a dead end at the Railroad Pass Casino parking lot, the former route of US 93, US 95, and US 466

=== New York ===
- New York State Route 454
- I-481 and New York State Route 481

== See also ==
- Veterans Highway
- Veterans Parkway (disambiguation)
- Vietnam Veterans Memorial Highway (disambiguation)
