= Veterans Highway =

Veterans Highway may refer to:

- A former alignment of Maryland Route 3 and U.S. Route 301, that now runs parallel to Interstate 97 in Anne Arundel County, Maryland
- South Carolina Highway 22 in Horry County, South Carolina

== See also ==
- Veterans Memorial Highway
- Veterans Parkway (disambiguation)
- Vietnam Veterans Memorial Highway (disambiguation)
- Veterans Memorial Parkway, London, Ontario
- Veterans Boulevard
