= North Syracuse Central School District =

School district in the U.S. state of New York

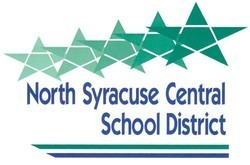

Location
- North Syracuse Central New York Onondaga County, New York; United States
- Coordinates: 43.1254°N 76.1454°W

District information
- Type: Public School District
- Grades: PK-12
- Established: 1952
- Superintendent: Dr. Terry L. Ward
- Schools: 11
- Budget: $212,196,591 (for 2024-2025)
- NCES District ID: 3621210

Students and staff
- Students: 7,990 (as of 2022-2023)
- Teachers: 651 (as of 2022-2023)
- Student–teacher ratio: 12.27%
- District mascot: Northstars
- Colors: Royal Blue, Kelly Green and White

Other information
- Website: nscsd.org

The North Syracuse Central School District (NSCSD) is a public school district in Central New York in the United States. The district is located just outside Syracuse, New York. It serves the communities of North Syracuse, Clay, Cicero, Bridgeport, and Mattydale. The District covers 89 sq mi (230 km^{2}) with approximately 5,600 residents.

In January 2025, Dr. Terry L. Ward became the Superintendent of Schools. Ward was previously the Superintendent of Schools for the Cato-Meridian Central School District. He replaced Daniel Bowles as Superintendent of Schools.

The North Syracuse Central School District is the largest of the 23 component school districts in the Onondaga-Cortland-Madison (OCM) Boards of Cooperative Educational Services (BOCES). As a component of the OCM BOCES, NSCSD participates in its career and technical, alternative and special education programs.

== Board of education ==
Current board members are:

- Michael A. Mirizio, President
- Paul Farfaglia, Vice President
- Robert Crabtree
- Carol Goehner
- Matthew Hermann
- Joshua Ludden
- Cheryl McDonald
- Amanda Sugrue
- Mark Thorne

Jillian Herrera is currently the District Clerk.

== Administrators ==
- Dr. Terry L. Ward, Superintendent of Schools
- Dr. Michael J. Baroody, Deputy Superintendent
- Donald F.X. Keegan, Associate Superintendent for Business Services

== Schools ==
=== Pre-Kindergarten ===
- Early Education Program at Main Street School
  - 205 South Main Street; North Syracuse, NY 13212
  - Principal: Dawn Hussein

=== Elementary (Grades K-4) ===
- Allen Road Elementary
  - 803 Allen Road; North Syracuse, NY 13212
  - Principal: Emily Lafountain
- Karl W. Saile Bear Road Elementary
  - 5590 Bear Road; North Syracuse, NY 13212
  - Principal: Olivia Cambs
- Cicero Elementary
  - 5979 Route 31; Cicero, NY 13039
  - Principal: Melissa O'Donnell
- Lakeshore Road Elementary
  - 7180 Lakeshore Road; Cicero, NY 13039
  - Principal: Tina Chmielewski
- Roxboro Road Elementary
  - 200 Bernard Street; Syracuse, NY 13211 (Mattydale)
  - Principal: Matthew Motala
- Smith Road Elementary
  - 5959 Smith Road; North Syracuse, NY 13212
  - Principal: Lyndsey Maloney

=== Middle Schools (Grades 5-7) ===
- Gillette Road Middle
  - 6150 South Bay Road, Cicero, NY 13039
  - Principal: Hilary Cox
- Roxboro Road Middle
  - 300 Bernard Street, Mattydale, NY 13211
  - Principal: Heather Pellegrino
  - Associate Principals:
    - Anthony Puma
    - Matthew Reilly (Interim)

=== Junior High (Grades 8-9) ===
- North Syracuse Junior High
  - 5353 West Taft Road, North Syracuse, NY 13212
  - Principal: Naomi Trivison
  - Associate Principals:
    - Miranda Magley
    - Melissa June

=== Senior High (Grades 10-12) ===
- Cicero – North Syracuse High School
  - 6002 Route 31, Cicero, NY 13039
  - Executive Principal: Kristen Hill

== Logo ==
The District logo was redesigned in 1994. The district held a contest open to the community to design the new district logo. The current logo was designed by then junior Joseph Byrns (class of 95) in a computer graphics course at Cicero-North Syracuse High School.
