= Curtis Johnson (linebacker) =

American gridiron football player (born 1985)

No. 94, 98
- Position: Defensive end

Personal information
- Born: February 16, 1985 (age 41); Lauderhill, Florida, U.S.
- Listed height: 6 ft 3 in (1.91 m)
- Listed weight: 237 lb (108 kg)

Career information
- College: Clark Atlanta
- NFL draft: 2008: undrafted

Career history
- Indianapolis Colts (2008); Dallas Cowboys (2009); St. Louis Rams (2010); New Orleans Saints (2011)*; Toronto Argonauts (2012)*; Miami Sting (2013)*
- * Offseason or practice squad member only

Career NFL statistics
- Games played: 10
- Total tackles: 6
- Sacks: 1
- Stats at Pro Football Reference
- Stats at CFL.ca (archive)

Curtis Edward Johnson (born February 16, 1985) is an American former professional football player who was a defensive end in the National Football League (NFL) for the Indianapolis Colts, Dallas Cowboys, and St. Louis Rams. He was signed by the Indianapolis Colts as an undrafted free agent in 2008. He played college football for the Clark Atlanta Panthers.

== Early life ==
Johnson was born in Lauderhill, Florida and moved to Clay, New York. He attended Cicero-North Syracuse High School, where he was a two-time Section III All-state selection at defensive end. As a senior, he received All-Central New York honors and Post-Standard All-CNY honors at running back.

== College career ==
Johnson accepted a football scholarship from Morrisville State College. As a freshman he started 10 games at defensive end and had 12 sacks. He posted 152 tackles (72 solo) and 12 sacks in 2 years, while being a two-time All-Northeast Football Conference selection. He transferred to Division II Clark Atlanta University after his sophomore season.

As a junior, he started 10 games, registering 75 tackles (50 solo), 5 sacks and 18 tackles for loss. He led the Division II with 9 forced fumbles.

As a senior, he started 11 games, making 112 tackles (69 solo), 14 sacks and led the Division II with an average of 2.5 tackles for loss-per-game. He was named SIAC Defensive Player of the Year and Daktronics All-American. He finished his career at Clark with 187 tackles (119 solo) in 21 career games.

== Professional career ==
=== Pre-draft ===
Pre-draft measurables
Height	Weight	Arm length	Hand span	40-yard dash	20-yard shuttle	Three-cone drill	Vertical jump	Bench press	Wonderlic
6 ft 2 5/8 in (1.90 m)	242 lb (110 kg)	33 in (0.84 m)	9 5/8 in (0.24 m)	4.60 s	4.46 s	6.78 s	34 in (0.86 m)	25 reps	x
All values from NFL Combine

=== Indianapolis Colts ===
Johnson was signed as an undrafted free agent by the Indianapolis Colts after the 2008 NFL draft on May 2. As a rookie, he was declared inactive for the first 3 games. He appeared in seven games as a backup defensive end and special teamer, making 5 defensive tackles (2 solo), one sack and 6 special teams tackles. He was waived injured on August 31, 2009.

=== Dallas Cowboys ===
On September 1, 2009, he was claimed off waivers by the Dallas Cowboys. He was moved to outside linebacker in the team's 3–4 defense. He missed 4 games with a hamstring injury. He appeared in 3 games and had 2 special teams tackles. He was released on September 4, 2010.

=== St. Louis Rams ===
On September 5, 2010, the St. Louis Rams signed Johnson to their practice squad. On October 20, he was promoted to the active roster to play special teams. On October 25, he was released and re-signed to the practice squad. On December 22, he was promoted to the active roster. He wasn't re-signed after the season.

=== New Orleans Saints ===
On July 29, 2011, he was signed by the New Orleans Saints to play defensive end. On August 6, he was released to make room for defensive end Jeff Charleston.

=== Toronto Argonauts ===
On May 10, 2012, Johnson was signed by the Toronto Argonauts of the Canadian Football League. He was released in May.

=== Miami Sting ===
On December 21, 2012, Johnson signed with the Miami Sting of the Ultimate Indoor Football League (UIFL) to play as a linebacker. The team folded before the season began.

== Personal life ==
His brother J.R. Johnson played linebacker in the NFL.
