= Minetto, New York (disambiguation) =

Minetto, New York is the name of a CDP and a town in Oswego County, New York:

- Minetto (CDP), New York
- Minetto (town), New York
