= Cicero–North Syracuse High School =

High school in Cicero, New York, United States

Cicero-North Syracuse High School
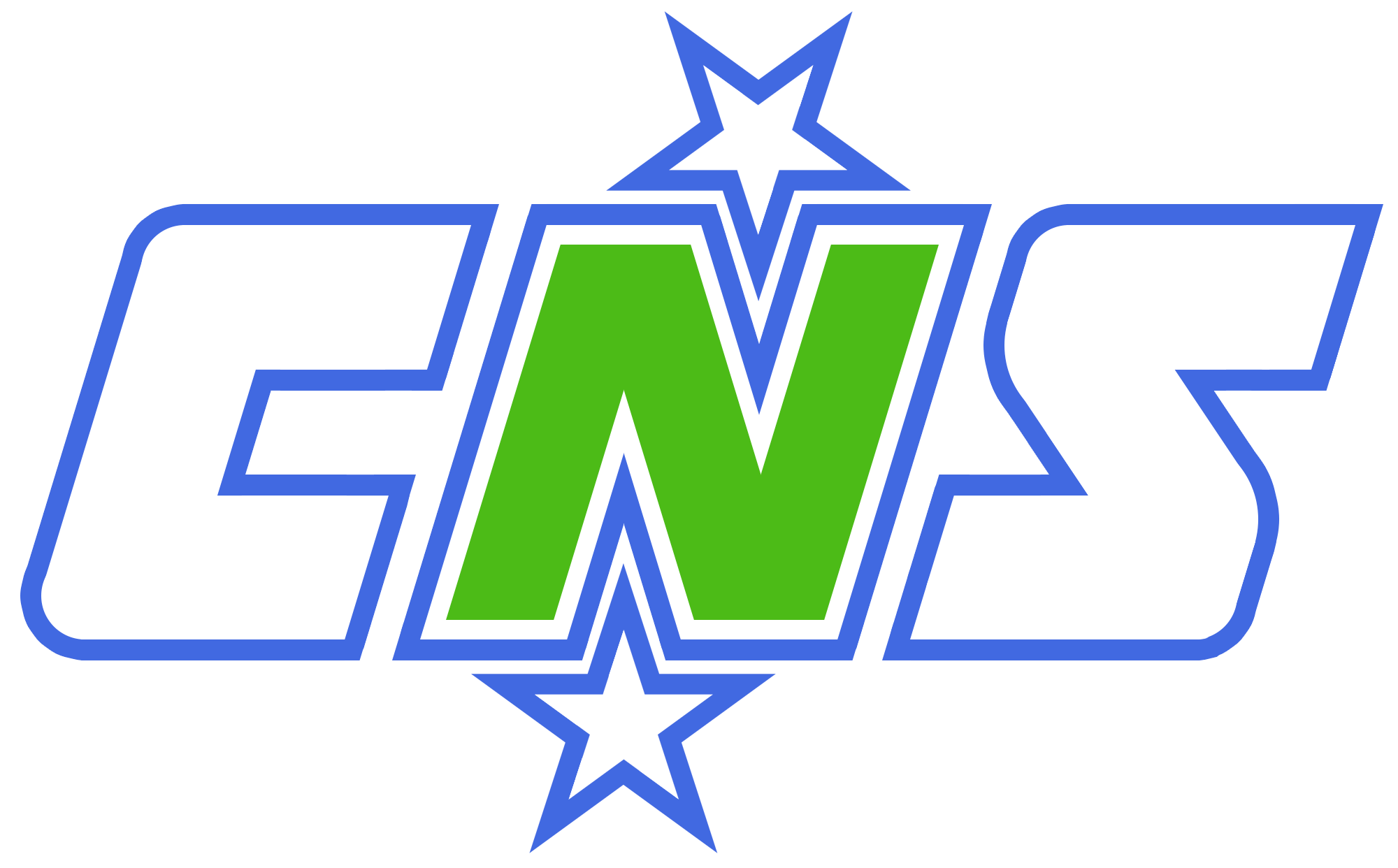

Location
- 6002 Route 31; Cicero, New York 13039; United States
- 43.1769°N 76.1065°W

Information
- Type: Public
- Established: 1967
- School district: North Syracuse Central School District
- NCES School ID: 362121002997
- Principal: Kristen Hill
- Teaching staff: 142.85 (on an FTE basis)
- Grades: 10–12
- Enrollment: 1,748 (2024-2025)
- Student to teacher ratio: 12.24
- Campus: Suburban: Large
- Colors: Royal blue, kelly green, and white
- Mascot: Northstars
- Nickname: CNS, C-NS
- Yearbook: Orator
- Website: www.nscsd.org/cnshs

Cicero–North Syracuse High School is an American public high school located in Cicero, New York, United States serving tenth through twelfth grade students. The school is part of the North Syracuse Central School District.

== Overview ==
Cicero High School and North Syracuse High School were separate schools within the North Syracuse Central School District until merging in the 1980s. The schools' athletics programs first merged for the 1981–82 school year. In March 1982, 45% of students voted to call the schools' sports teams the Northstars, ahead of the Cavaliers or Crusaders. In 1983–84, the schools themselves were merged.

Cicero–North Syracuse High School hosts grades 10–12 and serves approximately 1,750 students. The (interim) school principal is Kristen Hill. Cicero–North Syracuse High School is often called C–NS. C–NS hosts many extracurricular activities, such as student clubs and sports teams. C–NS is the home of the Cicero–North Syracuse "Unicorns" Marching Band. The school hosts about twenty co-ed sports, with New York State Championship titles in boys' cross-country running in 1989, 1995, and 1996, and in girls' softball in 1989, 1999, 2004, 2006 and 2013.

In 1993, the marching band won the Bowl Games of America national championship and in 1994 won the New England Scholastic Band Association championship.

In 2006, CNS won the Syracuse Area Live Theater Youth (S.A.L.T.Y.) award for best High School Musical with their performance of The Music Man. During the 2006–2007 school year, the school hosted two school-wide summits, one focusing on dress code.

In 2009, the Cicero–North Syracuse High School Varsity Winterguard were crowned as the WGI SA Class Champions, winning the National Title for the first time, with a nearly perfect score of 97.4. They received a Perfect Score in the Movement Caption. In 2017, the Junior Varsity took first place in the Mid York Color Guard Circuit in the class SA2. The varsity team took first in Scholastic Open and received the bronze medal at WGI World Championships in Dayton, Ohio. These achievements boosted the Varsity Winterguard to the Scholastic World class.

In 2010, the boys' and girls' varsity basketball teams became Section 3 champions for the first time in school history.

In 2016 and 2017 the Marching Band won the Large School 2 state championships for the New York State Field Band Conference. This was the first championship win for the band in 29 years. Also in 2017, the band won the USBands 5A National Championship in Allentown, Pennsylvania. The group also performed in the 2018 Macy's Thanksgiving Day Parade. In 2022, the band led an undefeated in-state season, taking home first place in the national class with a score of 96.8. The band traveled to the USBands Open Class National Championship in New Jersey and received 3rd place with a score of 94.0. The Marching Band would repeat as NYS national class champions in 2023 for the first time in school history.

== Notable alumni ==
- Tyvon Branch (2004), professional football player
- Josh Burke (2012), guitarist for The Red Jumpsuit Apparatus
- Mark Copani (1998), professional wrestler in the WWE as "Muhammad Hassan"
- Patrick Corbin (2007), professional baseball player
- Richard Gere (North Syracuse 1967), actor
- Dave Giusti (1957), professional baseball player
- Curtis Johnson (2003), professional football player
- J.R. Johnson (1998), professional football player
- Beth Mowins (1985), ESPN play-by-play announcer and sports journalist
- Dan Pepicelli (1985), college baseball coach
- Breanna Stewart (2012), professional basketball player, Olympic Gold Medalist
- Mike Washington Jr. (2021), NFL running back for the Las Vegas Raiders
- Maury Youmans (1955), professional football player
