= New York State Route 279 (disambiguation) =

New York State Route 279 is a north–south state highway in Niagara County, New York, United States, that was established in April 1935.

New York State Route 279 may also refer to:

- New York State Route 279 (1931–1933) in Erie County
- New York State Route 279 (1933–1935) in Orange, Sullivan, and Ulster Counties
