= New York State Route 209 =

New York State Route 209 may refer to:

- New York State Route 209 (1930–1935) in Orleans County
- U.S. Route 209 in New York, the only route numbered "209" in New York since the mid-1930s
