= New York State Route 280 =

State highway in Cattaraugus County, New York, US

New York State Route 280
- Map of the Allegheny Reservoir area with NY 280 highlighted in red

Route information
- Maintained by NYSDOT
- Length: 11.59 mi (18.65 km)
- Existed: 1930–present

Major junctions
- South end: PA 346 at the Pennsylvania state line in South Valley
- North end: I-86 / NY 17 / Southern Tier Expressway in Coldspring

Location
- Country: United States
- State: New York
- Counties: Cattaraugus

Highway system
- New York Highways; Interstate; US; State; Reference; Parkways
← NY 279	→ I-281

New York State Route 280 (NY 280) is an 11.59-mile (18.65 km) long north–south state highway in rural Cattaraugus County, New York, in the United States. The southern terminus of the route is at the Pennsylvania state line in South Valley, where it becomes Pennsylvania Route 346 (PA 346). The northern terminus is at exit 18 on the Southern Tier Expressway (Interstate 86 or I-86 and NY 17) in Coldspring, west of Salamanca. NY 280 follows both the eastern edge of the Allegheny Reservoir and the western boundary of Allegany State Park for its entire length.

When NY 280 was originally assigned as part of the 1930 renumbering of state highways in New York, it was little more than a short spur route off of NY 17 that followed the Allegheny River south to the hamlet of Quaker Bridge. In 1965, the Kinzua Dam was completed, leading to the creation of the Allegheny Reservoir and the inundation of much of NY 280. As a result, the route was shifted onto a new alignment that was constructed along the eastern edge of the reservoir.

== Route description ==
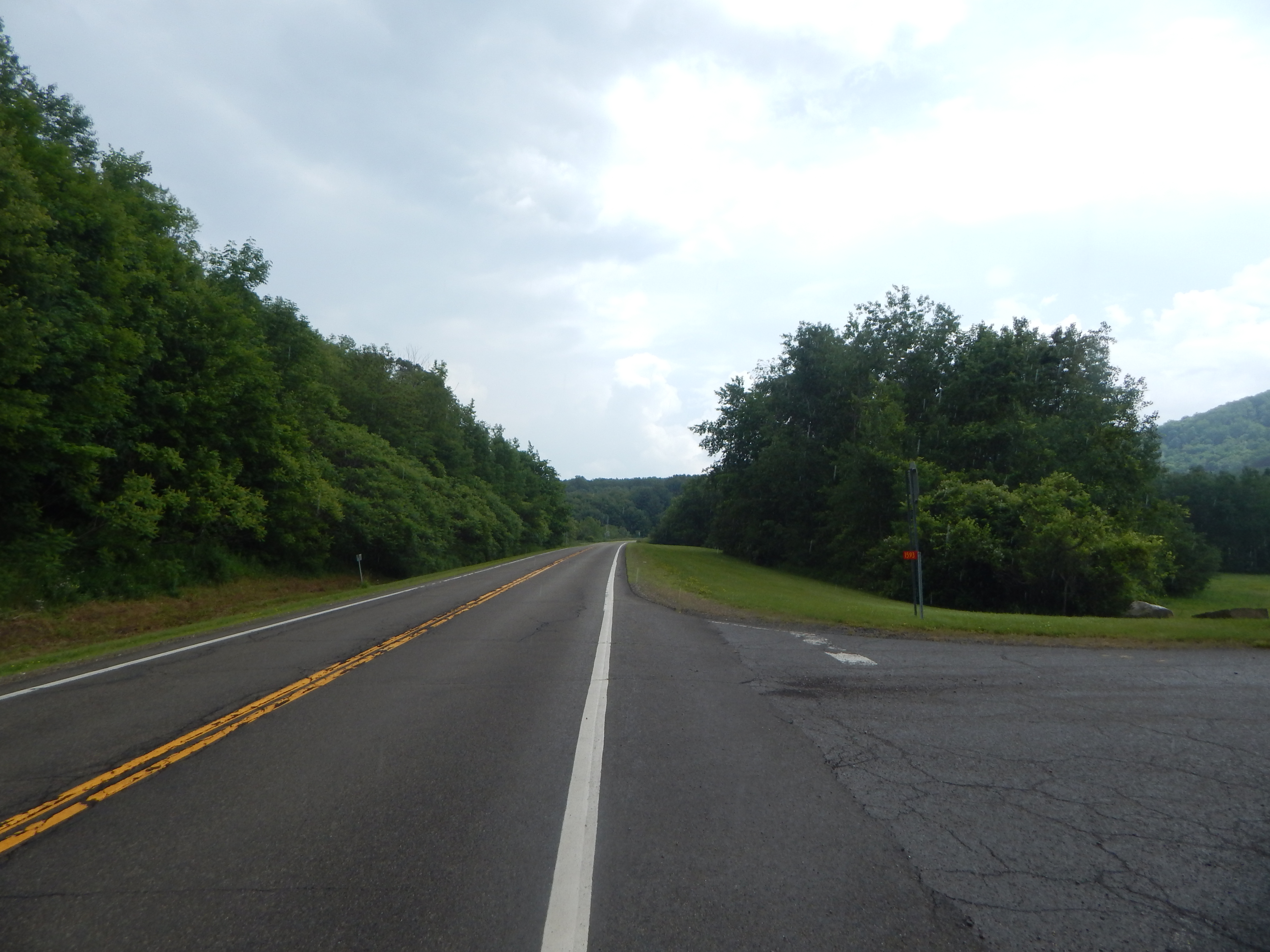
NY 280 through Allegany State Park

At the Pennsylvania state line in South Valley, PA 346 exits the Allegheny National Forest and becomes NY 280 upon entering New York. The route heads north along the eastern edge of the Allegheny Reservoir as East Bank Perimeter Road, clipping the southwestern corner of Allegany State Park prior to entering the Allegany Indian Reservation. NY 280 passes in and out of the park once more before turning to the east toward Quaker Lake as it enters the town of Coldspring. At Quaker Lake, NY 280 penetrates the park boundary once more and intersects Allegany State Park Route 3 (ASP Route 3) at the Quaker Run entrance. Here, NY 280 turns north, traversing a small waterway separating Quaker Lake from the reservoir before reentering the Allegany Indian Reservation limits.

Between ASP Route 3 and exit 18 of the Southern Tier Expressway (I-86 and NY 17), NY 280 continues to straddle both the eastern extent of the Allegheny Reservoir and the western perimeter of Allegany State Park before terminating at a diamond interchange with the Southern Tier Expressway. The West Bank Perimeter Road (unsigned NY 950A), which parallels NY 280 from the Pennsylvania line northward on the western bank of the reservoir, meets the expressway at exit 17 2.5 miles (4.0 km) to the west.

== History ==
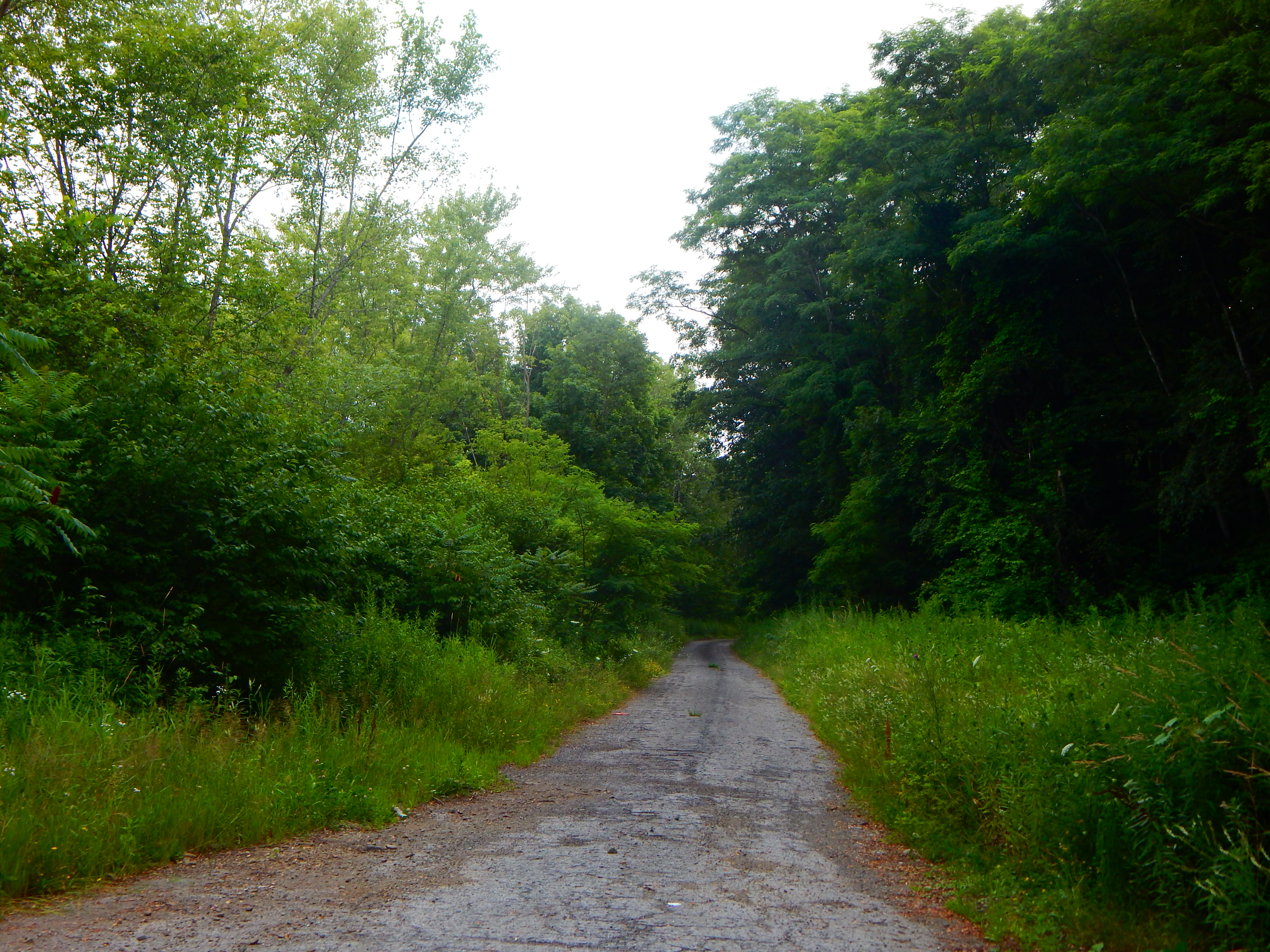
NY 280's former alignment from old NY 17 in Coldspring

Families living in the hamlet of Cold Spring were brought in through the Cornplanter Grant in the early 1800s, and by 1809, the village located along future–NY 280 exceeded 500 people in log houses. The alignment of future NY 280 appears in the 1869 Cattaraugus County Atlas on its alignment from Cold Spring to Quaker Bridge. At the time a dirt road, a total of 14 families lived along the road. Construction of the Seneca Trading Post, a general store, began in 1833, which was a hub of activity at the southern end of the road in Quaker Bridge, supplying stuff for tourists of the area and serving as the town's post office until 1964. The building was intentionally burned in 1965. NY 280 was assigned as part of the 1930 renumbering of state highways in New York to a short roadway connecting NY 17, then an at-grade highway, to the now-submerged hamlets of Cold Spring and Quaker Bridge along the western bank of the Allegheny River. The designation ended in Quaker Bridge, a community situated on the eastern riverbank near the modern junction of NY 280 and Allegany State Park Route 3 in the town of Elko. NY 280 remained relatively unchanged up through the early 1960s.

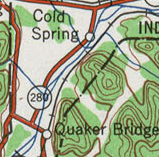
Original alignment of NY 280

In October 1960, ground was broken on the Kinzua Dam, which would dam the Allegheny River downriver from NY 280 at a point east of Warren, Pennsylvania. The structure was completed on December 13, 1965, leading to the creation of the Allegheny Reservoir. Much of NY 280 was inundated by the new reservoir, as were Cold Spring, Quaker Bridge, and a significant portion of Pennsylvania Route 346 (PA 346) that ran along the river in Warren County. As a result, new alignments were built for both NY 280 and PA 346 along the eastern edge of the new reservoir. Construction of NY 280's new alignment began in 1965 and was completed by 1968. NY 280 now began at the realigned PA 346 at the state line and ended at exit 18 of the Southern Tier Expressway, which was built between Steamburg and Salamanca during the mid-1960s.

Portions of the original Route 280 are still navigable, but in poor condition; the road is currently in use as a service road for a private campground.

== Major intersections ==
The entire route is in Cattaraugus County.

Location	mi	km	Destinations	Notes
South Valley	0.00	0.00	PA 346 east	Continuation into Pennsylvania
Coldspring	7.25	11.67	Allegany State Park Route 3 – Allegany State Park	Western terminus of ASP Route 3
Coldspring	11.59	18.65	I-86 / NY 17 / Southern Tier Expressway – Jamestown, Salamanca	Northern terminus; exit 18 (I-86 / NY 17)
1.000 mi = 1.609 km; 1.000 km = 0.621 mi
