= New York State Route 481 =

State highway in central New York, US

New York State Route 481
- Veterans Memorial Highway
- Map of the Syracuse area with NY 481 highlighted in red

Route information
- Maintained by NYSDOT and the city of Oswego
- Length: 31.79 mi (51.16 km)
- Existed: January 1, 1970–present

Major junctions
- South end: I-81 / I-81 BL in North Syracuse
- NY 31 in Clay; NY 3 in Fulton
- North end: NY 104 in Oswego

Location
- Country: United States
- State: New York
- Counties: Onondaga, Oswego

Highway system
- New York Highways; Interstate; US; State; Reference; Parkways
← I-481	→ I-487

New York State Route 481 (NY 481) is a state highway in Central New York in the United States. The southern terminus of the route is at an interchange with Interstate 81 (I-81) and Interstate 81 Business in North Syracuse, where the highway continues southeastward as I-81 (formerly Interstate 481). Its northern terminus is located at an intersection with NY 104 in Oswego about two blocks from Lake Ontario. In between, NY 481 serves the communities of Clay, Phoenix and Fulton along the Oswego River. NY 481 was one of two state routes in the Syracuse area serving as an extension of an Interstate Highway until its counterpart, I-481, was decommissioned by a reroute of I-81; NY 690 continues to serve as an extension of Interstate 690.

From its southern terminus to the Fulton city line, NY 481 is a four-lane freeway with a handful of interchanges. It enters Fulton as a four-lane surface road, but gradually narrows to two lanes as it heads through the northern portion of the city. North of Fulton, NY 481 becomes a four-lane limited-access highway and proceeds to the outskirts of Oswego, where it reverts into a two-lane road. NY 481 also serves as a faster alternate to NY 48 from the Syracuse area to downtown Oswego. Both travel along the Oswego River, with NY 481 on the eastern side and NY 48 on the western side.

NY 481 was commissioned in 1970 from North Syracuse to Fulton and extended northward to Oswego in 1982. The portion of the route north of Fulton was designated as NY 20 from 1924 to 1927 and NY 57 from 1927 to 1982. The segment of NY 481 south of Fulton follows a newer facility that was built in the 1970s. NY 481 and I-81 comprise the Veterans Memorial Highway.

== Route description ==
All of NY 481 is officially designated as part of the Veterans Memorial Highway, a designation that also encompasses the entirety of former I-481, NY 481's southeastward continuation around the eastern half of Syracuse. The northernmost three blocks of NY 481 in the city of Oswego are locally maintained. The remainder of the route is maintained by the New York State Department of Transportation (NYSDOT).

=== South of Fulton ===
NY 481 begins in North Syracuse at an interchange with I-81, a north–south highway running north to Watertown and south to Syracuse, and Interstate 81 Business. The junction is about 1 mile (1.6 km) north of Syracuse Hancock International Airport, located on I-81. Like I-81, NY 481 is a four-lane freeway with a handful of interchanges for the first 20 miles (32 km) of its run. Exit numbers along NY 481 pick up where those of former I-481 leave off. Heading northwest from the I-81 interchange, the highway crosses U.S. Route 11 (US 11) almost immediately, passing just south of the former site of Penn-Can Mall. The road soon enters the town of Clay, where it initially runs along the northern edge of a marsh for 3 miles (4.8 km). Near the north edge of the swamp, the freeway passes over the St. Lawrence Subdivision, a CSX Transportation rail line linking Syracuse to the North Country.

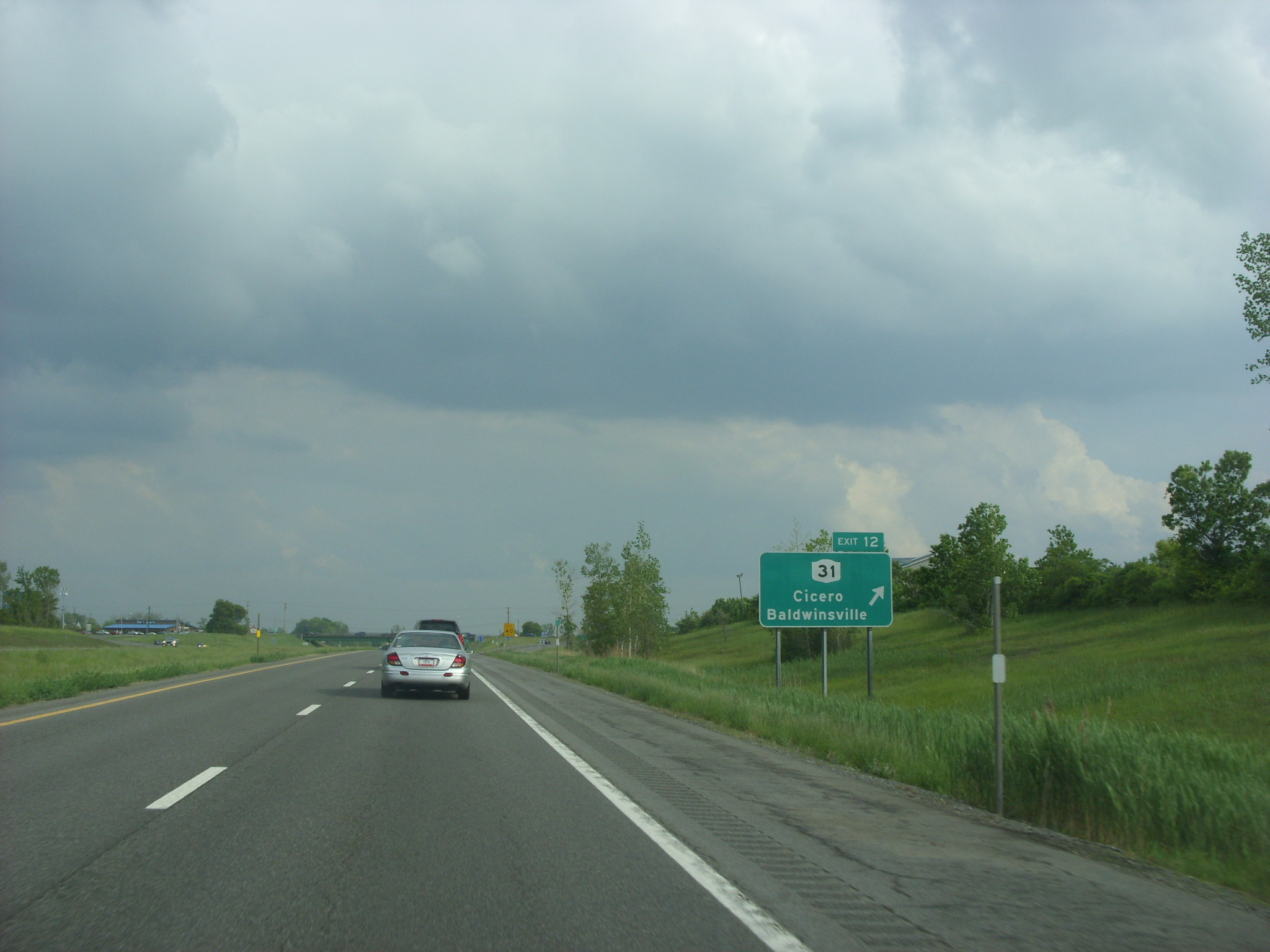
NY 481 approaching exit 7 (NY 31) in Clay (signage has since been updated)

Past the swamp, NY 481 serves more developed areas of the town, running alongside a cluster of housing tracts on the outskirts of a large retail area centered around the highway's junction with NY 31. The commercial district comprises several strip malls and the Great Northern Mall, the latter situated northeast of the NY 31 interchange. From here, the freeway heads through markedly less developed areas, running across farmland to reach the Oneida River (Erie Canal) at the northern edge of Onondaga County. It continues across the waterway into the Oswego County town of Schroeppel, where it connects to County Route 57A (CR 57A) at a half-diamond interchange east of the village of Phoenix. NY 481 continues to run across undeveloped areas of fields and forests, even as it passes close to Phoenix.

As the route heads away from the village, it connects to NY 264 at a full diamond interchange about 1 mile (1.6 km) north of Phoenix. The route is the village's main north–south highway, and it connects NY 481 and Phoenix to SUNY Oswego's Phoenix campus, located just southwest of the freeway. The junction with NY 264 is the last interchange on the route; however, NY 481 remains controlled-access up to the Fulton city line. As the route approaches the city limits, it takes on a more westerly track, passing over CSX's Fulton Subdivision and the Sunoco Ethanol plant located in the former Miller Brewing Company brewery before intersecting CR 57 at an at-grade junction just inside the city limits. The route continues northwest from here, heading through significantly more developed areas as South 1st Street.

=== Fulton to Oswego ===
In Fulton, NY 481 travels slowly through the center of town, serving as the main north–south route through the city. It changes names several times, becoming South 4th Street after South 1st Street where it passes the former Nestle chocolate plant which closed in 2003, and eventually South 2nd Street when South 4th Street leaves to the north. The four-lane road serves a handful of homes; however, the majority of establishments along the street are commercial. In downtown Fulton, NY 481 intersects NY 3 at Broadway, one of two streets to cross the Oswego River and connect to NY 48, a parallel route to NY 481 on the western riverbank. Past Broadway, NY 481 changes names to North 2nd Street but otherwise remains unchanged until Oneida Street, located seven blocks north of NY 3. Here, the highway narrows to two lanes, a width it retains through the remainder of Fulton and into the town of Volney.

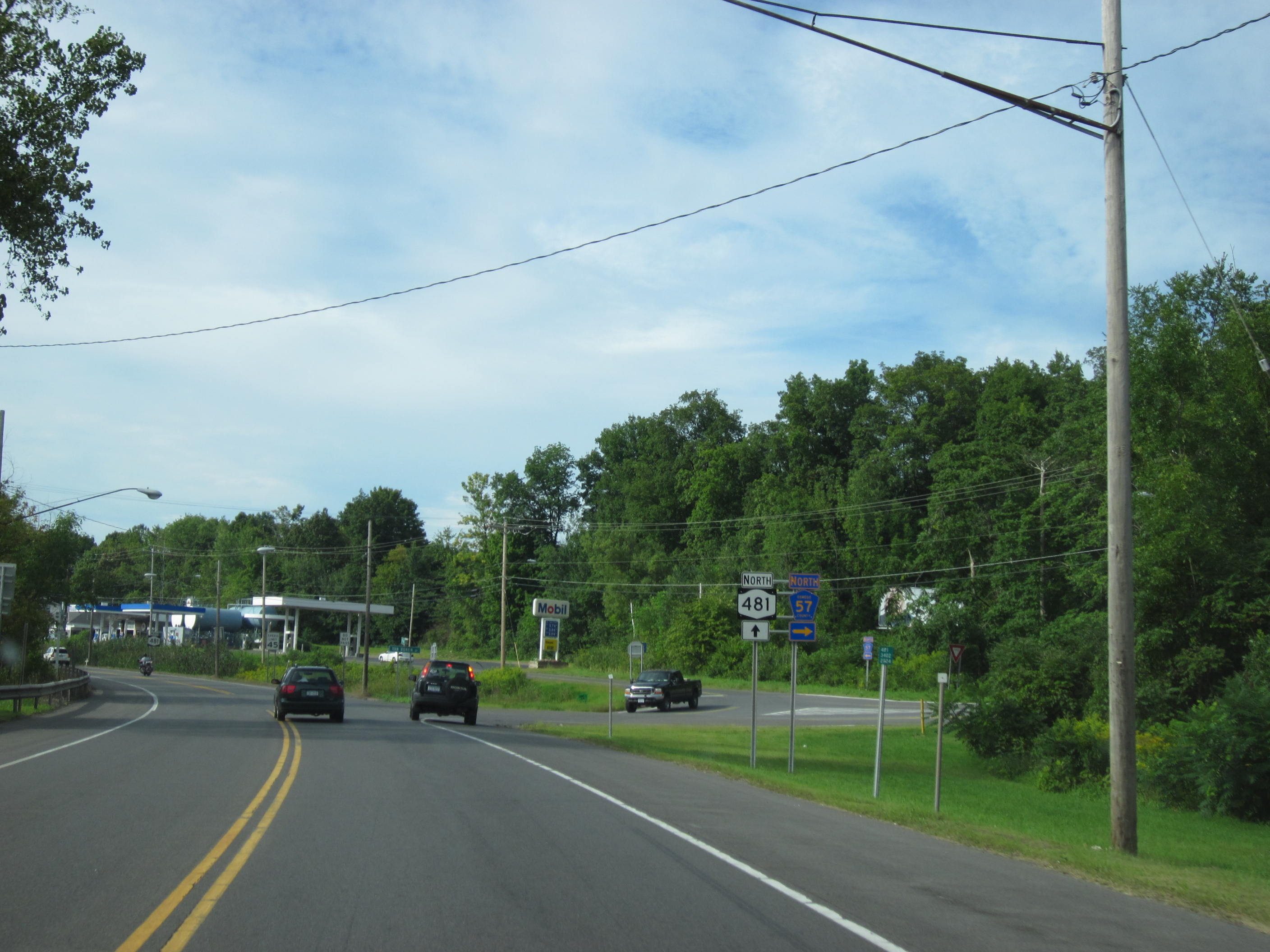
NY 481 at the junction with CR 57 in Fulton

At the northern city line, NY 481 connects to the south end of CR 57's northern segment, which closely parallels NY 481 between Fulton and Oswego. Continuing into Volney, the highway briefly runs alongside the Oswego River prior to entering another lightly developed region of the county. About 4 miles (6.4 km) north of Fulton, NY 481 expands to a four-lane divided highway once more; however, it remains an at-grade roadway. The Fulton Subdivision also rejoins the road at this point, running alongside NY 481's northbound lanes to the Oswego city limits. Between Fulton and Oswego, the route serves mostly undeveloped areas but has several stretches of scenic beauty, mostly consisting of glimpses of locks, rapids and small waterfalls through trees separating NY 481 from the river.

NY 481 narrows to two lanes near the southern edge of Oswego, where it separates from the Fulton Subdivision and curves northwestward as it crosses into the city limits. The road, now named East River Road, continues on this track to the banks of the Oswego River and a junction with CR 57. This is also where NY 481 passes by the Oswego County Public Safety Center, a complex comprising the county offices, courts, and a correctional facility. NY 481 continues along the east bank of the river into the main part of Oswego, initially serving a mostly residential area before entering downtown as East 1st Street.

The homes continue to line NY 481 until a junction with Utica Street, one of two roads to cross the river within Oswego and thus provide access between NY 481 and NY 48. From here, NY 481 serves several businesses and the central offices of the Oswego City School District before ending three blocks north of Utica Street at a junction with NY 104 (Bridge Street), Oswego's other highway with a river crossing. Both directions of NY 104 provide access to the remainder of the city's central business district while East 1st Street continues north past NY 104 to Oswego Harbor, where Oswego River empties into Lake Ontario.

== History ==
The primary north–south roadway connecting Syracuse to Oswego via Fulton on the eastern bank of the Oswego River was originally designated as Route 34, an unsigned legislative route, by the New York State Legislature in 1908. When the first set of posted routes in New York were assigned in 1924, legislative Route 34 was designated as NY 20. NY 20 was redesignated as NY 57 in 1927 to avoid numerical duplication with the newly designated U.S. Route 20. The NY 57 corridor remained unchanged until the late 1950s when construction began on a new roadway to replace the existing two-lane, curvy routing of NY 57 between Fulton and Oswego. It was completed by 1960.

In the mid-1960s, construction began on an expressway linking Fulton to I-81 in North Syracuse. The under-construction highway, initially known as "Relocated Route 57", was designated as NY 481 on January 1, 1970. The NY 481 designation also extended north to NY 3 in Fulton by way of a short overlap with NY 57. The portion of the expressway between Fulton and NY 31 in Clay was opened to traffic in the early 1970s while the rest was completed c. 1973. NY 481 was extended northward to its present terminus in downtown Oswego when the NY 57 designation was eliminated in May 1982.

== Major intersections ==
County	Location	mi	km	Old exit	New exit	Destinations	Notes
Onondaga	North Syracuse	0.00	0.00			I-81 south – Binghamton	Southern terminus
Onondaga	North Syracuse	0.00	0.00	9	1A (NB); 1A-B (SB)	I-81 BL south / I-81 north – Syracuse, Watertown	Signed as exits 1A (north) and 1B (south) southbound; exit 11 on I-81 Bus./BL 81; formerly I-481 until 2026
Onondaga	Cicero	0.50	0.80	10	1B (NB); 1C (SB)	US 11 (Circle Drive) – North Syracuse	Access via NY 930J/NY 931H; Circle Drive not signed southbound
Onondaga	Clay	2.4	3.9	11	2	Caughdenoy Road / Maple Road	Northbound exit only
Onondaga	Clay	6.97	11.22	12	7	NY 31 – Cicero, Baldwinsville	
Oswego	Schroeppel	10.54	16.96	13	11	CR 57A – Phoenix	Northbound exit and southbound entrance
Oswego	Schroeppel	13.04	20.99	14	13	NY 264 – Phoenix, Mexico	
Oswego	Fulton	19.49	31.37	Northern end of freeway section			
Oswego	Fulton	19.49	31.37			CR 57	Former NY 57
Oswego	Fulton	20.62	33.18			NY 3 to NY 48	
Oswego	Volney	27.1	43.6			CR 45 – Minetto, Mt Pleasant, Palermo	
Oswego	Oswego	31.79	51.16			NY 104	Northern terminus
1.000 mi = 1.609 km; 1.000 km = 0.621 mi: Incomplete access

== See also ==
- Interstate 481 for exits 81 (old exit 1) through 95 (old exit 8)
