= J.R. Johnson =

American football player (born 1979)

No. 55, 58
- Position: Linebacker

Personal information
- Born: June 20, 1979 (age 47); Los Angeles, California, U.S.
- Listed height: 6 ft 0 in (1.83 m)
- Listed weight: 240 lb (109 kg)

Career information
- High school: Cicero–North Syracuse (Cicero, New York)
- College: Syracuse
- NFL draft: 2002: undrafted

Career history
- Baltimore Ravens (2002); New Orleans Saints (2002); Seattle Seahawks (2002); Indianapolis Colts (2002)*; St. Louis Rams (2003)*; Carolina Panthers (2003)*; Oakland Raiders (2003)*; Atlanta Falcons (2004)*
- * Offseason or practice squad member only

Career NFL statistics
- Games played: 5
- Total tackles: 4
- Stats at Pro Football Reference

Charles A. Johnson Jr., known as J.R. Johnson (born June 20, 1979) is an American former professional football player who was a linebacker for one season in the National Football League (NFL) with the Baltimore Ravens and New Orleans Saints. After playing college football for the Syracuse Orange, he was signed as an undrafted free agent in 2002 by Baltimore. Johnson also had stints with the Seattle Seahawks, Indianapolis Colts, Carolina Panthers, Oakland Raiders and Atlanta Falcons.

== Early life ==
J.R. Johnson was born on June 20, 1979, in Los Angeles, California. He went to high school at Cicero–North Syracuse. In his high school career, he had 2,870 yards and 50 touchdowns. He also had 9 interceptions and 221 tackles.

=== High school awards and honors ===
- SuperPrep All-American (1996)
- Grid Iron All-Star (1996)
- First-team All-Central New York (1996)
- Regional Elite Team (1996)
- Top 50 Athletes in New York (1996)

== College career ==
Johnson went to college at Syracuse University. He was redshirted in 1997, in 1998, his freshmen year, he played in 9 games. He had 16 tackles in the season. The next year he played in 8 games, he had 16 tackles. In 1999, he had 60 tackles and a sack in 10 games. He had 44 tackles in 2001.

=== Career college statistics ===
Year	Games	Comb	Tack	Asst	Int	Sacks	FF	FR	FRYds
1998	9	16	13	3	0	0	0	0	0
1999	8	16	12	4	0	0	0	0	0
2000	10	60	36	24	0	1.0	1	0	0
2001	12	44	24	20	0	0	0	0	0
Career	39	136	85	51	0	1.0	1	0	0

=== College Awards and Honors ===
- 1x BIG EAST Special Teams player of the week

== Professional career ==
=== Baltimore Ravens ===
J.R. Johnson was signed as a undrafted free agent on April 25, 2002, by the Baltimore Ravens. He played in four games for the Ravens. He had 4 tackles. He also had one penalty. He was released on October 14.

=== New Orleans Saints ===
One day after being released, he was signed by the New Orleans Saints. He played in one game for them. He was waived on December 8.

=== Seattle Seahawks ===
The day after he was waived, he was claimed by the Seattle Seahawks. He was waived two days later.

=== Indianapolis Colts ===
On January 7, 2003, he was signed by the Indianapolis Colts. He was released on August 26.

=== Carolina Panthers ===
He was later signed by the Carolina Panthers, but he did not play in any games.

=== Oakland Raiders ===
On November 19, he was signed by the Oakland Raiders. He was released on December 16. The Raiders were his 6th team in 2 years.

=== Atlanta Falcons ===
He was signed on January 19, 2004, by the Atlanta Falcons. He was released on May 18. The Falcons were his last team.

== Personal life ==
His brother Curtis Johnson played in the NFL also. He was a defensive end and linebacker.
