= Vietnam Veterans Memorial Highway =

Vietnam Veterans Memorial Highway may refer to:

- Interstate 84 in Idaho
- Interstate 84 in Oregon
- Delaware Expressway
- Interstate 291 (Connecticut)
  - Interstate 95 in Pennsylvania between the Delaware state line and Interstate 295
  - Interstate 295 in Pennsylvania between the Scudder Falls Bridge and Interstate 95
  - Interstate 495 (Delaware)
- Washington State Route 20 in Okanogan County
- U.S. Route 10 in Wisconsin
- Interstate 89 in Vermont
- Interstate 77 in Ohio

== See also ==
- Veterans Highway
- Veterans Memorial Highway
- Veterans Memorial Parkway
