= Pennellville, New York =

Pennellville
- hamlet
- Location within the state of New York
- Coordinates: 43°16′57″N 76°16′14″W
- Country: United States
- State: New York
- County: Oswego
- City: Schroeppel
- Elevation: 413 ft (126 m)
- Time zone: UTC-5 (Eastern (EST))
  - Summer (DST): UTC-4 (EDT)
- ZIP codes: 13132

Pennellville /ˈpɛnɪvɪl/ is a hamlet in Oswego County, New York, United States. It is located in the Town of Schroeppel. Its ZIP Code is 13132. Elevation is 413 feet above Mean Sea Level.

== History ==
The hamlet is named after Richard Pennell M.D., of New York. His wife inherited the land from her father, George C. Schroeppel. Running through the area was a stream, called by the local Indian tribe Ahinahtanaganus (translated: "big fish water") upon which, in 1833, Dr. Pennell commissioned a sawmill, which was built by Laren Seymour.

The hamlet is part of the village of Phoenix School District.

The burial ground in the hamlet is the burial place of Dr. and Mrs. Pennell, and also Henry W. Schroeppel.
