= Veterans Parkway =

The following roads are called the Veterans Parkway:

- Veterans Parkway (Savannah, Georgia), freeway within Chatham County
- Veterans Parkway (Conway, South Carolina), South Carolina Highway 22
- Veterans Parkway (Springfield, Illinois), Illinois Route 4
- Veterans Parkway (Bloomington–Normal, Illinois), Interstate 55 business loop
- Veterans Parkway (Sioux Falls, South Dakota), future South Dakota Highway 100
- Veterans Parkway (Manhattan Beach, California), half of the Beach Cities Greenway

== See also ==
- Veterans Memorial Highway
