= Minetto (CDP), New York =

Minetto, New York
- CDP
- Location in Oswego County and the state of New York.
- Coordinates: 43°23′47″N 76°28′28″W
- Country: United States
- State: New York
- County: Oswego

Area
  - Total: 4.02 sq mi (10.40 km^{2})
  - Land: 3.75 sq mi (9.72 km^{2})
  - Water: 0.26 sq mi (0.68 km^{2})
- Elevation: 325 ft (99 m)

Population (2020)
  - Total: 1,262
  - Density: 336.3/sq mi (129.85/km^{2})
- Time zone: UTC-5 (Eastern (EST))
  - Summer (DST): UTC-4 (EDT)
- ZIP code: 13115
- Area code: 315
- FIPS code: 36-47680
- GNIS feature ID: 0957403

Minetto is a hamlet (and census-designated place) in Oswego County, New York, United States. The population was 1,069 at the 2010 census.

Minetto is located in the Town of Minetto at the southern city line of Oswego. It is the only settlement in the town.

== Geography ==
Minetto is located at 43°23′46″N 76°28′27″W (43.396295, -76.474378).

According to the United States Census Bureau, the CDP has a total area of 3.6 square miles (9.3 km^{2}), of which 3.4 square miles (8.7 km^{2}) is land and 0.2 square mile (0.6 km^{2}) (6.65%) is water.

The community is on the west bank of the Oswego River.

== Demographics ==
Historical population
Census	Pop.	Note	%±
2020	1,262		—
U.S. Decennial Census

As of the census of 2000, there were 1,086 people, 411 households, and 323 families residing in the CDP. The population density was 323.0 inhabitants per square mile (124.7/km^{2}). There were 431 housing units at an average density of 128.2 per square mile (49.5/km^{2}). The racial makeup of the CDP was 97.88% White, 0.28% Black or African American, 0.18% Native American, 0.83% Asian, 0.37% from other races, and 0.46% from two or more races. Hispanic or Latino of any race were 1.20% of the population.

There were 411 households, out of which 36.0% had children under the age of 18 living with them, 66.9% were married couples living together, 9.5% had a female householder with no husband present, and 21.4% were non-families. 17.3% of all households were made up of individuals, and 9.0% had someone living alone who was 65 years of age or older. The average household size was 2.64 and the average family size was 2.98.

In the CDP, the population was spread out, with 25.5% under the age of 18, 6.8% from 18 to 24, 26.0% from 25 to 44, 29.7% from 45 to 64, and 12.0% who were 65 years of age or older. The median age was 41 years. For every 100 females, there were 92.2 males. For every 100 females age 18 and over, there were 92.6 males.

The median income for a household in the CDP was $51,176, and the median income for a family was $59,844. Males had a median income of $51,806 versus $30,156 for females. The per capita income for the CDP was $23,055. About 4.8% of families and 6.7% of the population were below the poverty line, including 10.3% of those under age 18 and 7.6% of those age 65 or over.
