= Clay, New York =

Town in New York, United States

- Town
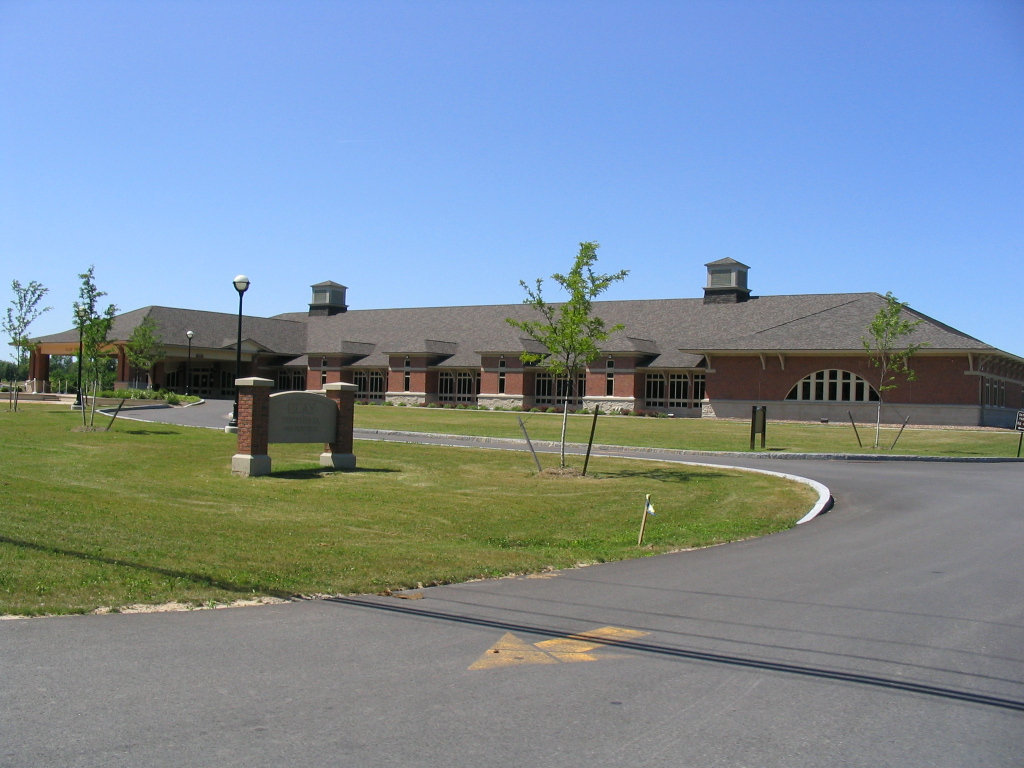
- Clay town hall

- Logo

- Location in Onondaga County and the state of New York.
- Coordinates: 43°9′2″N 76°11′39″W
- Country: United States
- State: New York
- County: Onondaga

Government
  - Type: Town Council
  - Town Supervisor: Damian M. Ulatowski (R)

Area
  - Total: 48.86 sq mi (126.54 km^{2})
  - Land: 47.96 sq mi (124.21 km^{2})
  - Water: 0.90 sq mi (2.33 km^{2})
- Elevation: 377 ft (115 m)

Population (2020)
  - Total: 60,527
  - Density: 1,262.1/sq mi (487.30/km^{2})
- Time zone: UTC-5 (Eastern (EST))
  - Summer (DST): UTC-4 (EDT)
- ZIP Codes: 13041 (Clay); 13090 (Bayberry); 13212 (North Syracuse); 13027 (Baldwinsville); 13029 (Brewerton); 13088 (Liverpool)
- Area code: 315
- FIPS code: 36-16067
- GNIS feature ID: 0978835
- Website: townofclayny.gov

Clay is a town in Onondaga County, New York, United States. As of the 2020 Census, the population was 60,527, making it Syracuse's most populous suburb. The town was named after American attorney and statesman Henry Clay.

Clay is north of Syracuse. It is the largest town in the county, contains part of the village of North Syracuse, and is a suburb of Syracuse. It contains the major retail strip of Syracuse's northern suburbs, along New York State Route 31 (NY-31), including the currently defunct Great Northern Mall. Micron Technology is constructing a US$125 billion complex consisting of four megafab memory chip manufacturing buildings in Clay, a project which will create tens of thousands of jobs.

== History ==
Prior to European settlement in the area, Clay was inhabited by the Onondaga Nation, part of the Iroquois Confederacy, some of whose descendants still live in the area today. Clay was within the Central New York Military Tract. The town was once known as West Cicero and was founded by strangers about 1791. The Town of Clay was formed in 1827 from the Town of Cicero, one of the original townships of the military tract.

In October 2022, Micron Technology pledged $100 billion for a giant semiconductor complex in the White Pine Commerce Park located in Clay.

== Geography ==
According to the United States Census Bureau, the town has a total area of 48.8 square miles (126 km^{2}), of which 48.0 square miles (124 km^{2}) is land and 0.8 square miles (2.1 km^{2}) (1.60%) is water.

The northern town line is the border of Oswego County, marked by the Oneida River. The Seneca River marks the western town line. Both these rivers join into the Oswego River near the community of Three Rivers. The renovated Erie Canal follows the rivers around the border of Clay.

New York State Route 31 is an east–west highway through the town. New York State Route 481 intersects NY-31 west of Euclid.

=== Communities and locations in the Town of Clay ===
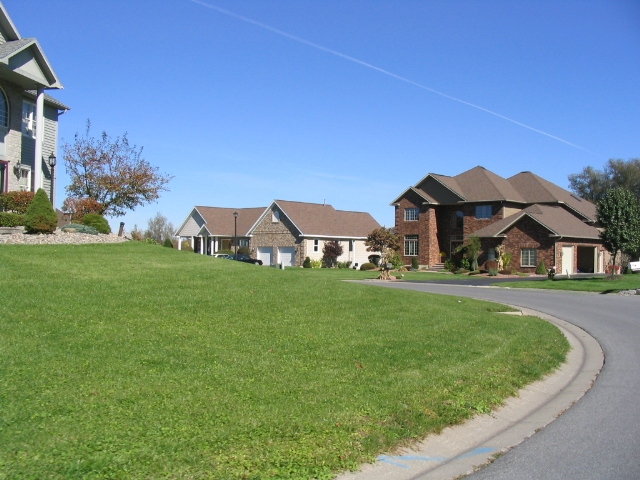
A neighborhood in Clay

- Bayberry — A suburban residential community within the town
- Belgium — A hamlet on NY-31 near the western town line
- Cherry Estates — A hamlet near the eastern town line
- Clay — The hamlet of Clay is located on NY-31.
- Country Meadow — A very large (and still-growing) neighborhood off of Caughdenoy Rd, site of the 2008 Parade of Homes
- Elmcrest — A hamlet in the southwest part of Clay
- Euclid— A hamlet in the northern part of the town on NY-31
- Fairway East — A sprawling subdivision linking Morgan Road with Soule Road. There are many streets and approximately 500 homes.
- Gatewood — A neighborhood in the eastern part of the town off of Maple Road. Consists of three streets and 72 houses.
- Great Northern Mall — A large regional mall at the junction of routes NY-31 and NY-481. Built in Clay in 1988, it is one of three major enclosed malls in the Syracuse area.
- Kimbrook — A suburban residential community
- Lawton Valley Hunt — A very large housing development between Caughdenoy Road, NY-31, and Lawton Road. The final phase of the development has recently been completed.
- Lynelle Meadows — A suburban residential community
- Moyers Corners — A hamlet on NY-31 near the western town line, east of Belgium
- North Syracuse — The Village of North Syracuse is mostly within the Town of Clay with the remainder in the Town of Cicero.
- Pinegate North & South — A suburban residential community located across from Soule Road Middle and Elementary Schools
- Rodger Corner — A hamlet south of Clay village
- The Farmstead — A new upscale neighborhood off of Maple Road, site of the 2014 Parade of Homes
- Three Rivers — A hamlet at the western town line at the junction of the Oneida, Oswego, and Seneca Rivers
- Willow Stream — A suburban residential community
- Woodard— A hamlet in the southwest part of Clay
- Youngs — A hamlet north of Clay village

== Demographics ==
Historical population
Census	Pop.	Note	%±
1830	2,095		—
1840	2,852		36.1%
1850	3,402		19.3%
1860	3,583		5.3%
1870	3,156		−11.9%
1880	2,910		−7.8%
1890	2,630		−9.6%
1900	2,578		−2.0%
1910	2,431		−5.7%
1920	2,488		2.3%
1930	3,560		43.1%
1940	4,050		13.8%
1950	7,001		72.9%
1960	17,760		153.7%
1970	36,274		104.2%
1980	52,838		45.7%
1990	59,749		13.1%
2000	58,805		−1.6%
2010	58,206		−1.0%
2020	60,527		4.0%
U.S. Decennial Census

As of the census of 2000, there were 58,805 people, 22,294 households, and 15,940 families residing in the town. The population density was 1,224.9 inhabitants per square mile (472.9/km^{2}). There were 23,398 housing units at an average density of 487.4 per square mile (188.2/km^{2}). The racial makeup of the town was 92.13% White, 3.50% African-American, 0.47% Native American, 2.01% Asian, 0.02% Pacific Islander, 0.38% from other races, and 1.48% from two or more races. Hispanic or Latino people of any race were 1.39% of the population.

There were 22,294 households, out of which 38.0% had children under the age of 18 living with them, 56.9% were married couples living together, 11.0% had a female householder with no husband present, and 28.5% were non-families. 22.3% of all households were made up of individuals, and 6.4% had someone living alone who was 65 years of age or older. The average household size was 2.63 and the average family size was 3.11.

In the town, the population was spread out, with 27.7% under the age of 18, 7.3% from 18 to 24, 32.5% from 25 to 44, 23.1% from 45 to 64, and 9.3% who were 65 years of age or older. The median age was 35 years. For every 100 females, there were 93.0 males. For every 100 females age 18 and over, there were 90.1 males.

The median income for a household in the town was $90,412, and the median income for a family was $97,493. Males had a median income of $40,387 versus $27,996 for females. The per capita income for the town was $22,011. About 4.1% of families and 5.7% of the population were below the poverty line, including 7.5% of those under age 18 and 6.2% of those age 65 or over.

== Infrastructure ==
=== Fire departments ===
Clay is covered by Moyers Corners Fire Department and Clay Fire Department, with small sections covered by North Syracuse, Caughdenoy, and Brewerton Fire Departments.

=== Police Department ===
Clay maintained its own police department until 2008, when the Clay Police Department merged with the Onondaga County Sheriff's Office.

== Notable people ==
- Stacey Castor, convicted murderer
- Patrick Corbin, MLB pitcher
- Matilda Maranda Crawford, newspaper correspondent
- Richard Gere, actor
- James W. Ostrander, politician
- Jack Smith, attorney

== See also ==
- Syracuse, New York
- Weedsport
