= North Syracuse, New York =

Village in New York, United States

- Village
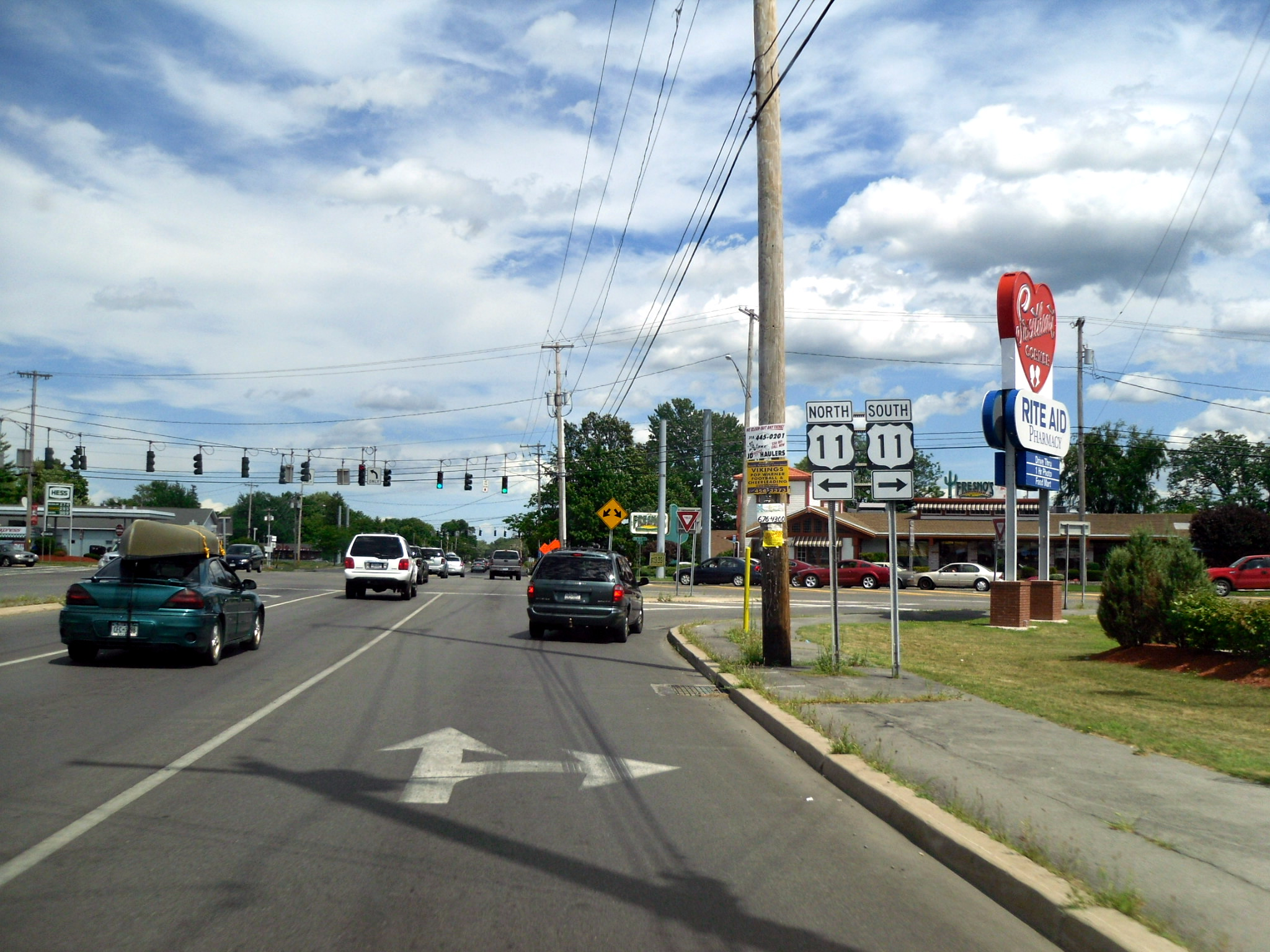
- Sweetheart Corner, viewed from the west

- Seal

- Location in Onondaga County and the state of New York.
- Coordinates: 43°8′0″N 76°7′56″W
- Country: United States
- State: New York
- County: Onondaga

Government
  - Mayor: Gary Butterfield

Area
  - Total: 1.99 sq mi (5.15 km^{2})
  - Land: 1.99 sq mi (5.15 km^{2})
  - Water: 0 sq mi (0.00 km^{2})
- Elevation: 420 ft (128 m)

Population (2020)
  - Total: 6,739
  - Density: 3,392.3/sq mi (1,309.77/km^{2})
- Time zone: UTC-5 (Eastern (EST))
  - Summer (DST): UTC-4 (EDT)
- ZIP code: 13212
- Area codes: 315 and 680
- FIPS code: 36-53660
- GNIS feature ID: 0958933
- Website: northsyracuseny.org

North Syracuse is a village in Onondaga County, New York, United States. As of the 2020 census, the population was 6,739. North Syracuse is located in the towns of Cicero and Clay, north of the city of Syracuse.

== History ==
The village was originally called Centerville and changed to its present name in 1880. It became an incorporated village in 1925. Among the first settlers, the Fergerson family located there in 1826. They still occupy the same land located in what is now the village center. Many local streets are named in their honor.

On July 18, 1846, the United States' first plank road opened in North Syracuse, primarily for salt transportation. The road cost $23,000, was 16-1/2 miles long, and was planked its entire length. Thomas Alvord, a state legislator who later became lieutenant governor, helped secure the passage of an act to construct, maintain and collect tolls. There were four tollgates about four miles apart that were operated by the company, a profitable enterprise for many years. The fees were 1 cent per head of cattle, 5 cents for a single horse, and 25 cents for a horse and wagon.

There was a dirt side and planked side to the road; the East Side was dirt and the West Side planked 3" thick by 8' long. Loaded wagons had the right of way on the planked side, the other side being reserved for empty wagons, single horses and for passing. Bicycles used the plank side on Sunday for racing. Due to wear and tear by horses' shoes and iron hoops on wagon wheels, a gang was constantly busy just making repairs.

North Syracuse was also the first New York State village to have its own fire district. The Volunteer Fire Department was established in 1913.

The current mayor of North Syracuse is Gary Butterfield, who has lived in North Syracuse since 1977.

== Geography ==
North Syracuse is located at 43°8′0″N 76°7′56″W (43.133334, -76.132321).

According to the United States Census Bureau, the village has a total area of 2.0 square miles (5.2 km^{2}), all land.

U.S. Route 11 passes through the village. Interstate 81 passes along the east side of the village.

== Demographics ==
Historical population
| Census | Pop. | Note | %± |
|---|---|---|---|
| 1930 | 1,766 | | — |
| 1940 | 2,083 | | 18.0% |
| 1950 | 3,356 | | 61.1% |
| 1960 | 7,412 | | 120.9% |
| 1970 | 8,687 | | 17.2% |
| 1980 | 7,970 | | −8.3% |
| 1990 | 7,363 | | −7.6% |
| 2000 | 6,862 | | −6.8% |
| 2010 | 6,800 | | −0.9% |
| 2020 | 6,739 | | −0.9% |
U.S. Decennial Census

As of the census of 2000, there were 6,862 people, 2,999 households, and 1,751 families residing in the village. The population density was 3,496.2 inhabitants per square mile (1,349.9/km^{2}). There were 3,137 housing units at an average density of 1,598.3 per square mile (617.1/km^{2}). The racial makeup of the village was 94.93% White, 1.36% African American, 0.86% Native American, 1.08% Asian, 0.03% Pacific Islander, 0.23% from other races, and 1.52% from two or more races. Hispanic or Latino of any race were 0.99% of the population.

There were 2,999 households, out of which 28.8% had children under the age of 18 living with them, 41.9% were married couples living together, 12.1% had a female householder with no husband present, and 41.6% were non-families. 34.9% of all households were made up of individuals, and 16.4% had someone living alone who was 65 years of age or older. The average household size was 2.28 and the average family size was 2.98.

In the village, the population was spread out, with 24.2% under the age of 18, 6.5% from 18 to 24, 30.9% from 25 to 44, 21.1% from 45 to 64, and 17.4% who were 65 years of age or older. The median age was 38 years. For every 100 females, there were 90.1 males. For every 100 females age 18 and over, there were 86.2 males.

The median income for a household in the village was $37,031, and the median income for a family was $47,853. Males had a median income of $36,292 versus $24,484 for females. The per capita income for the village was $18,906. About 7.0% of families and 10.2% of the population were below the poverty line, including 15.7% of those under age 18 and 7.1% of those age 65 or over.

== Education ==
It is in the North Syracuse Central School District.
