= Snug Harbor =

Cultural center in Staten Island, New York

- Sailors' Snug Harbor
- U.S. National Register of Historic Places
- U.S. National Historic Landmark District
- New York State Register of Historic Places
- New York City Landmark
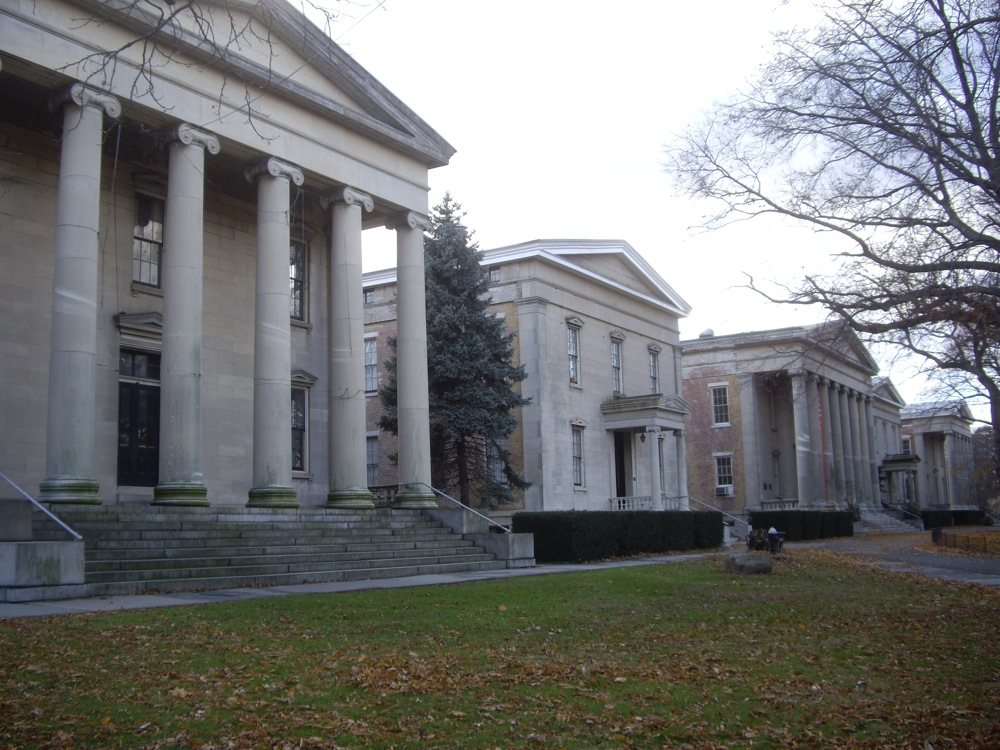
- Temple Row as seen in 2007

- Location within New York City Location within New York Location within the United States
- Interactive map of Sailors' Snug Harbor
- Location: 1000 Richmond Terrace, Staten Island, New York, US
- Coordinates: 40°38′33″N 74°06′10″W
- Built: 1831–1833 (Building C), 1840–1917 (subsequent buildings)
- Architects: Various, including: Minard Lafever and Richard Smyth (Temple Row); James Solomon (Veterans Memorial Hall); Louis Jallade (Great Hall); Robert W. Gibson (Music Hall)
- Architectural style: Greek Revival, Beaux Arts, Italianate, Victorian
- NRHP reference No.: 72000909
- NYCL No.: 0022–0027, 0742–0743, 1204–1205

Significant dates
- Added to NRHP: March 16, 1972
- Designated NHLD: December 8, 1976
- Designated NYSRHP: June 23, 1980
- Designated NYCL: October 14, 1965 (landmarks 0022–0027: buildings A–E and chapel); May 15, 1973 (landmarks 0742–0743: iron fence and gatehouse); October 12, 1982 (landmarks 1204–1205: interiors of building C and chapel)

Snug Harbor is an 83-acre (34 ha) campus containing more than two dozen architecturally significant buildings set along the Kill Van Kull on the North Shore of Staten Island in New York City, New York, US. It functioned as Sailors' Snug Harbor, a retirement home for sailors, during the 19th and 20th centuries. Since 1976, the buildings and grounds have been managed by Snug Harbor Cultural Center and Botanical Garden as a cultural center complex and used by various cultural and arts organizations. The entire complex is a National Historic Landmark district, and several structures are New York City designated landmarks.

Captain Robert Richard Randall bequeathed funds and land for a sailors' home upon his 1801 death. Fights over his will delayed the complex's development and forced its trustees to find a new site, where building C, the first structure at Snug Harbor, opened in 1833. Additional structures were built throughout the 19th and 20th centuries. Following a prolonged preservation dispute and several redevelopment proposals in the 1960s and 1970s, the institution moved to North Carolina. The Snug Harbor Cultural Center, a nonprofit organization affiliated with the Smithsonian Institution, has gradually renovated the grounds and many buildings over the years.

The buildings at Snug Harbor are designed in the Greek Revival, Beaux Arts, Italianate, and Victorian styles. Among those are buildings A–E, five interlocking Greek Revival structures known as Temple Row. The buildings are set in extensively landscaped grounds, surrounded by a cast iron fence. The grounds also include other structures such as a chapel and the Music Hall, along with the 55-acre (22 ha) Staten Island Botanical Garden. The Snug Harbor Cultural Center operates some of its own facilities and programs, including the botanical garden, the Newhouse Center for Contemporary Art, and the Music Hall. Other space is leased to institutions such as the Staten Island Children's Museum and the Staten Island Museum.

== Use as sailors' home ==
=== Creation ===
==== Randall will and challenges ====
Snug Harbor was founded through a bequest after the 1801 death of Revolutionary War soldier and ship master Captain Robert Richard Randall. US Founding Father Alexander Hamilton and later US Vice President Daniel D. Tompkins are sometimes credited with having written Randall's will, though the extent of their involvement is disputed. The will bequeathed much of his estate for public use. His country manor in what is now Greenwich Village, Manhattan, (Note: The estate was located near Washington Square Park. It does not line up exactly with the modern Manhattan street grid, but sources generally agree that the land is bounded roughly by Fifth Avenue to the west, 10th Street to the north, and Fourth Avenue to the east. The southern boundary is variously given as 6th Street, 8th Street, or both Waverly Street and Astor Place.) was reserved as an institution for "aged, decrepit and worn-out sailors", which he called "Sailors' Snug Harbor"; the phrase "snug harbor" referred to a comfortable retreat. The 21-acre (8.5 ha) tract, which Randall had acquired in 1790, was assembled from the land grants of two 17th-century Dutch colonists. Retirement benefits for the elderly had not yet been established in the US, and sailors could not receive such benefits until well into the 20th century.

Randall's will provided for the establishment of a board of trustees, which included the mayor of New York City, the president and vice president of the Marine Society, senior ministers of Trinity Church and First Presbyterian Church, the head of the New York Chamber of Commerce, and some later-abolished government positions. (Note: The positions of state chancellor and state recorder, who were named as trustees in the original will, had been abolished by the 20th century, while the mayor was removed from the board in 1950.) All changes not explicitly stated in the will required judicial approval, and external gifts were banned. Following delays, prompted by questions over whether governmental interests could legally have a vested interest in Randall's estate, the board of trustees was incorporated on February 6, 1806. The trustees held their first meeting on April 21. In the meantime, the Manhattan property was leased as a farm.

As early as 1817, the northward development of Manhattan had prompted the trustees to look elsewhere for a retirement home. Several challenges to Randall's will were also initiated, delaying further progress. One challenge came from a Stephen Brown, who alleged that Randall had been derelict in his duty as the executor of Brown's grandfather's estate; the trustees did not acknowledge Brown's claim. Another was initiated in 1826 by Anglican Bishop John Inglis of Nova Scotia, a distant cousin of Randall's, who claimed he was an heir to Randall's estate. Inglis, one of his cousins, and Brown filed claims against Randall's Manhattan property. Inglis's lawsuit was eventually escalated to the Supreme Court of the United States, which ruled in favor of the trustees.

==== New site and first building ====
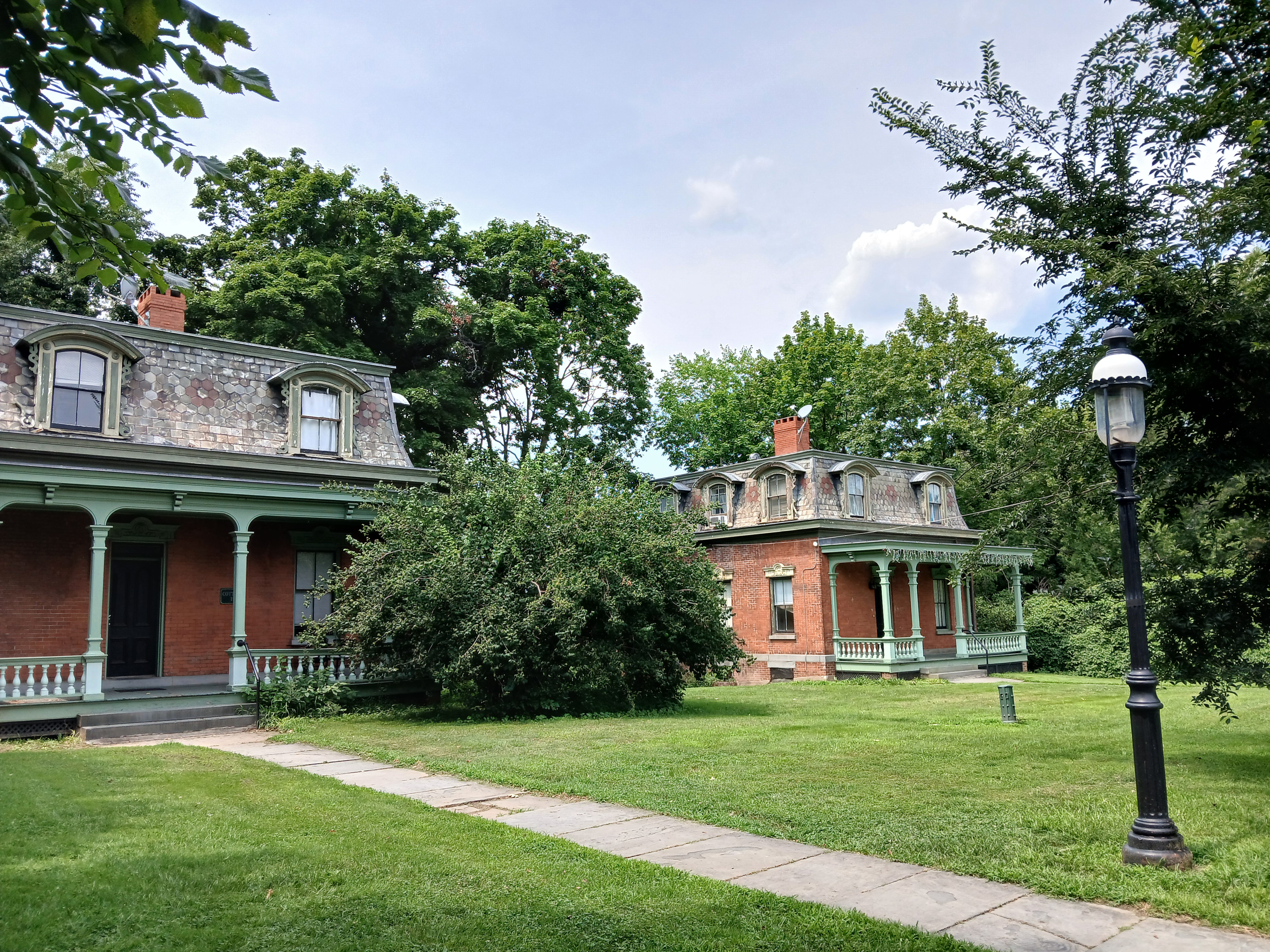
Some of the cottages among the cottage row in Snug Harbor

By the time the will challenges were settled, the once-rural land around the Manhattan site had been developed, and Snug Harbor's trustees decided to maximize profits by renting out the land. They changed the proposed site of the institution to a 130-acre (53 ha) plot on Staten Island overlooking the Kill Van Kull, which had belonged to Isaac Houseman. The initial site was purchased in May 1831. The trustees later bought 21 acres (8.5 ha) and leased another 36 acres (15 ha); their assemblage gradually expanded to 200 acres (81 ha). The institution retained the Manhattan property, leasing out the grounds for 21-year periods. Structures such as apartment buildings, department stores, the campus of New York University, and Washington Mews were developed on the sites.

The institution then looked to develop the first of what was to become five Greek Revival buildings. The trustees began soliciting construction bids after buying the site and began constructing a dock in July 1831. Work on the first structure, now building C, had begun by September, with a cornerstone laying ceremony that October or November. Minard Lafever was involved with the original design but departed abruptly, leaving Samuel Thomson & Son to finish the work. Building C was completed in August 1833, initially housing 37 retired sailors. John Whetten was appointed as the institution's first governor that year. Snug Harbor may have been one of the US's first retirement homes, though it was patterned after older institutions abroad, such as the Greenwich Hospital, London. Many of the initial residents were poor or disabled, and annual operating costs initially ran to $88.50 per resident (equivalent to $2,953 in 2025).

=== Operation ===
Tenancy at Snug Harbor was granted only to US citizens, who had served at least ten years on a foreign vessel or five years (Note: One source cites Randall's will as having required six years of service.) in the United States Navy or on an American civilian vessel. Residents were generally accepted if they were at least 60 years old or disabled, and sailors with sufficient tenure were accepted regardless of their demographics or rank. Residents could be rejected for moral turpitude, contagious diseases, or alcoholism, and other maritime tradesmen were refused admission if they were not sailors.

The residents were described by 19th-century sources as "inmates", though this term was no longer used by the 20th century. Residents were locally also known as "snugs" or "snuggies". While staff addressed all residents as "captain" regardless of their real-world rank, in practice, there was an implicit hierarchy based on residents' real-world ranks and service. There were relatively few rules, other than that residents be well-behaved, keep their rooms tidy, and abide by a curfew. Outside of curfew hours, residents were welcome to come or go as they pleased, and they could stay with families or friends for extended periods. Initially, the only exception was Sunday, when they were required to attend church on-site, though even this was no longer compulsory by the 1890s.

The complex had a kitchen and infirmary, alongside various amenities such as workshops, recreation rooms, theater, library, chapel, and music hall. It had a dedicated fire department, power plant, and stores. Three meals were served daily in the complex's mess halls. There was also a farm, along with other structures such as a greenhouse, piggery, and creamery. Though residents had few responsibilities, some had voluntary side jobs, although they could not work off-complex. Residents grew food and crops such as tobacco and wormwood, and they engaged in other activities such as model shipbuilding and games such as cribbage, billiards, and pinochle. They also received regular allotments of liquor and tobacco, and two suits a year.

Snug Harbor was managed by a succession of governors, many of whom were former captains, and it employed matrons, who did housework. Deceased residents were buried in Snug Harbor's cemetery. More buildings were added over the years as the population increased. Until the mid-20th century, Snug Harbor hosted few outside events; the grounds were sometimes opened for golf tournaments.

==== 1830s to 1870s ====
Starting with John Whetten, and with few exceptions, most of Snug Harbor's governors from 1831 to the 1960s were Marine Society members. Randall's corpse was disinterred from St. Mark's Church in-the-Bowery in 1834 and reinterred at Snug Harbor, where a granite obelisk was built. Some residents, unaccustomed to civilian societal norms, initially got into fights, and numerous serially-inebriated residents reportedly took to theft. The complex had 85 residents by 1839, nearly half of building C's 200-person capacity. This prompted the construction of wings on either side between 1840 and 1842. The institution recorded its first black resident in 1842. The same year, to address Whetten's concerns about misdeeds committed by Snug Harbor's more alcoholic residents, a fence around the property was built starting that year. Whetten retired in 1844.

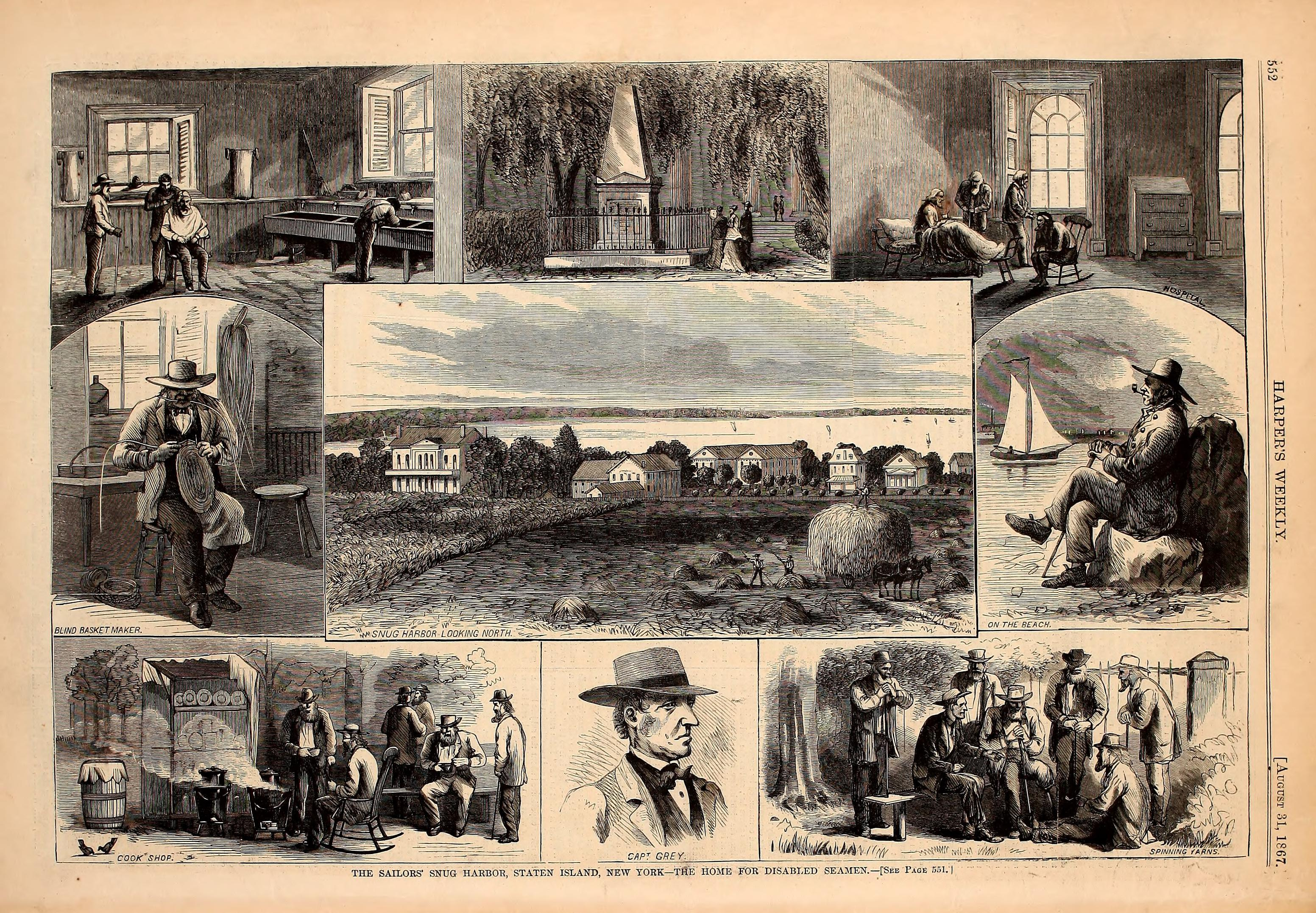
Sailors' Snug Harbor, seen in Harper's Weekly (1867)

Augustus F. De Peyster took over as Snug Harbor's second governor in 1845 and was by some accounts more well-liked by Whetten. The complex had grown to include 300 residents by 1850, about one-third of whom were non-Americans. A purpose-built chapel was constructed on the grounds in 1856; previously, residents had prayed in building C.

Retired sea captain Thomas Melville, the brother of Moby-Dick author Herman Melville, became the third governor of Snug Harbor in 1867. Under Melville's tenure, the trustees began paying residents to help with chores. Melville was also accused of embezzlement during his tenure, but was later exonerated. He also oversaw the construction of the final two buildings in Temple Row, which were finished in 1879–1880. During Melville's governorship, black residents were required to sleep and eat in segregated areas, but were allowed to mix with other residents elsewhere. Melville was a strict disciplinarian, frequently punishing residents who broke the rules by putting them on the "taboo list". Residents on the list were denied their tobacco ration and could not leave the premises.

==== 1880s to 1900s ====
Gustavus Trask became the fourth governor of Snug Harbor after Melville's death in 1884. He commissioned Augustus Saint-Gaudens to design a statue of Randall, which was cast the same year; building C's interior was also renovated that year. During Trask's tenure, several residents were investigated on suspicion of having sold their votes in the 1888 US presidential election. Trask also commissioned a church and a music hall, both designed by Robert W. Gibson. Snug Harbor's Music Hall was finished in July 1892, followed by the Randall Memorial Church the next year. The original chapel was also moved about 200 feet (61 m) in 1893. During that decade, the trustees unsuccessfully attempted to obtain tax exemptions.

Trask resigned in 1898 following accusations of misconduct, being replaced by Daniel Delehanty. Subsequently, Delehanty instituted several major reforms, including eliminating several rules, hiring additional staff, and expanding the hospital. Snug Harbor had about 1,000 residents at the beginning of the 20th century, many of whom had decades of service as sailors; they occupied rooms with one to five people each. The complex had grown to include numerous buildings, (Note: Sources cite figures of more than 30, 42, or 50 structures. These included 8 administration buildings.) along with forests and the complex's farm. The institution itself had become was one of the city's wealthiest, earning about $400,000 annually. It earned an annual surplus of $100,000 from renting out the Manhattan sites and had become one of Manhattan's largest landowners. By then, many of the residents were nearing or above age 90, and an average of fifty residents died every year. Although residents frequently attended events at the Music Hall, less than 10% attended church because Sunday service was no longer compulsory.

Snug Harbor's residents were disenfranchised in the early 1900s because of voting restrictions imposed on charitable institutions. The interior of the Randall Memorial Church was destroyed in a 1904 fire. Delehanty banned non-smoking residents from receiving tobacco in 1907, following reports that some residents were illicitly reselling tobacco, and a dispute regarding rental rates for the Manhattan property arose the same year. Delehanty resigned that December and was succeeded by A. J. Newbury. One magazine wrote in 1908 that the institution was no longer using rental income to help the sailors, instead using the funds for real estate investment.

==== 1910s to 1930s ====
The trustees were considering selling the Manhattan sites by 1911; the sites' annual return on investment was 2.5%, but the trustees wanted to invest in more profitable ventures. Since Randall's will had prohibited the land from being sold, the trustees sought to change the will. The New York Supreme Court ruled in 1912 that the trustees could sell the Manhattan land; disputes over the ruling continued until 1914, when the state's high court, the New York Court of Appeals, upheld the sale. New stained glass windows were installed at Randall Memorial Church in 1915. The trustees hired Louis Jallade that year to design a new recreation building, which opened in 1917 as the Great Hall. Newbury remained governor until his death in 1919, when George Ernest Beckwith was appointed in his place. The trustees loosened the bylaws during Beckwith's tenure.

Sailors' Snug Harbor had a $2 million surplus by 1922, though the trustees refused to release more details about their finances than necessary. Snug Harbor continued to host events for its residents, many of whom were elderly. The complex had 30 buildings across 150 acres (61 ha). A section of the site to the south was sold in 1927 to developers, who built the neighborhood of Randall Manor. By the early 1930s, Snug Harbor had around 900 residents and 200–300 staff members. The institution's holdings were valued at $20 million or $30 million, enough to sustain it despite the Great Depression. By then, the age requirement for residency had been raised to 65 years, due to high demand for space in Snug Harbor, although disabled sailors were still exempted. At the complex's centennial, it had accommodated 9,200 total residents.

Residents' voting rights were restored in 1932, and a plaque celebrating the complex's centennial was dedicated in April 1934. After Beckwith died in mid-1934, Howard A. Flynn took over as Snug Harbor's governor. The number of residents began to decline in the mid-20th century due to several factors. The establishment of Social Security in the 1930s provided retirement benefits to every American, reducing the need for facilities like Snug Harbor; additionally, revenues from the Manhattan properties decreased, and resources were diverted after the outbreak of World War II. There were also fewer sailors in general, with the growing popularity of trains and, later, automotive travel.

==== 1940s and 1950s ====
Snug Harbor's trustees offered to donate 9 acres (3.6 ha) of the Staten Island campus to the city government in 1940, but Mayor Fiorello La Guardia accused the trustees of using the gift to evade taxes. The New York City Board of Estimate ultimately accepted the land donation in 1943. The city government also considered taking over Snug Harbor, particularly the Randall Memorial Church, but the city's corporation counsel determined that Randall's will prohibited such a gift. The American entry into World War II prompted many residents to enter or re-enter the armed forces. Flynn served as the institution's governor until 1947, and he was succeeded by Henry R. Patterson. (Note: Sometimes referred to as "Robert Patterson") By then, Snug Harbor was increasingly relying on outside consultants' advice, as some trustees, including the mayor, never showed up to meetings. Mayor William O'Dwyer announced his intention to leave the board of trustees in 1949, receiving judicial approval. Also in 1949, the state attorney general sued the trustees after finding that residents were being charged fees; the suit was dropped when the fees were ended.

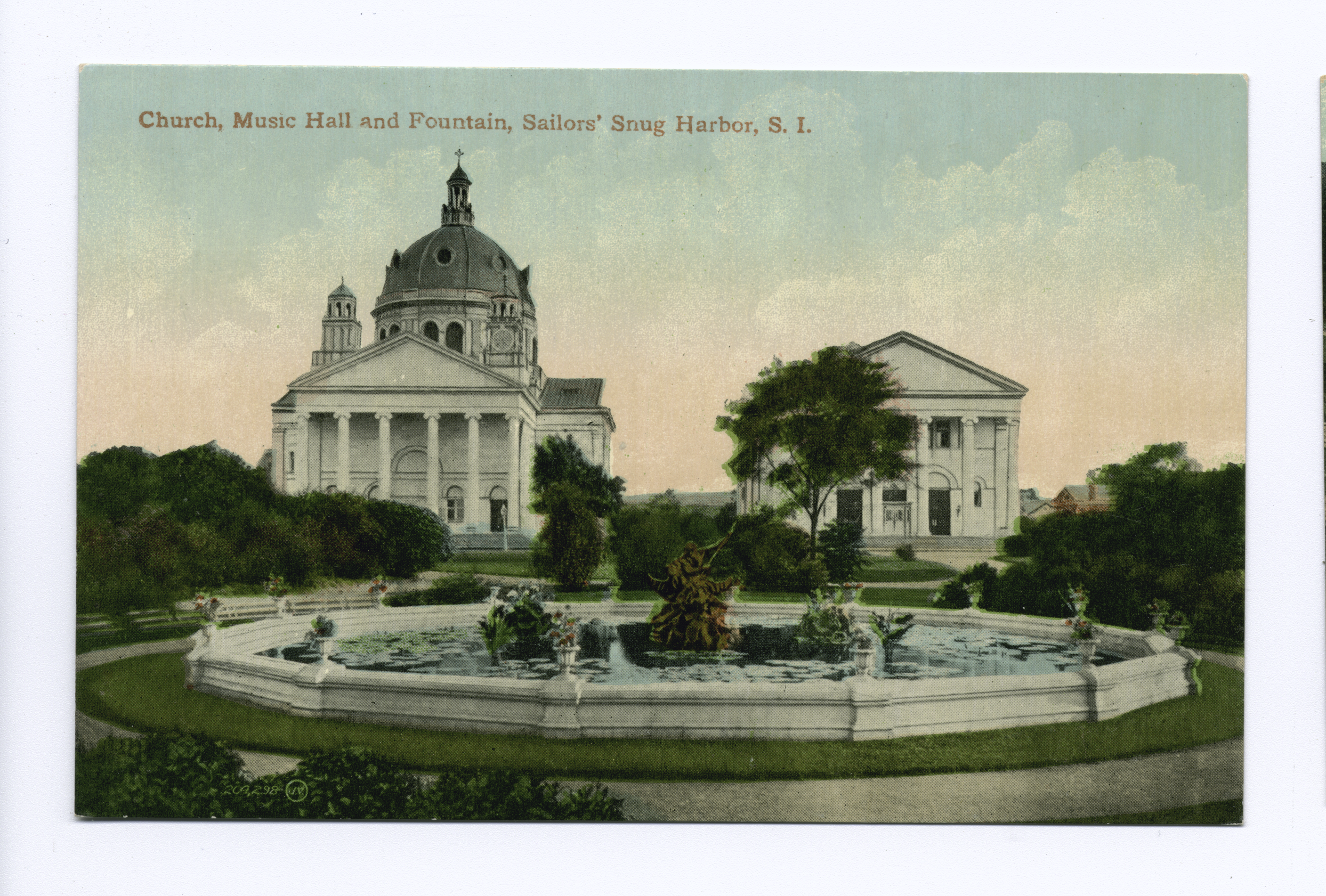
Randall Memorial Church, on left, was demolished in 1952

Snug Harbor was in financial difficulty by 1950, with about 375 remaining residents. That year, 23 buildings were demolished as part of a master plan created by Otis N. Auer and Harvey Wiley Corbett, the first major change to the campus since World War I. The work included adding or upgrading mechanical systems and consolidating activities in the remaining buildings. The trustees announced plans in 1951 to demolish the Randall Memorial Church. Despite proposals to save the chapel, it was demolished in 1952. The trustees also razed the complex's old hospital, which was replaced by a new infirmary. The complex's farm, the only one surviving on Staten Island's North Shore in the 1940s, was leased to developers who built apartments there.

Patterson retired in 1952, and his successor, Charles Baldwin, promised not to make further changes or sell property. After Baldwin died in early 1955, Frank Hickok served as interim governor until William C. Twigg was appointed permanently in 1956. By that decade, Snug Harbor was struggling financially; rental income from the Manhattan sites was insufficient to finance even a renovation of the Staten Island buildings. The institution's staff hierarchy was reorganized in the 1950s, and there was talk of converting Snug Harbor to a community college campus. Though the trustees initially disagreed on whether to transfer many management duties to a new director's position, they eventually employed a succession of directors. The trustees also began allowing public events in the mid-20th century, including graduation ceremonies and art shows. The institution still operated with few rules, though they did start charging fees for items to raise money. The number of residents had declined to just over 300.

=== Site proposals and sale ===
==== 1960s proposals ====
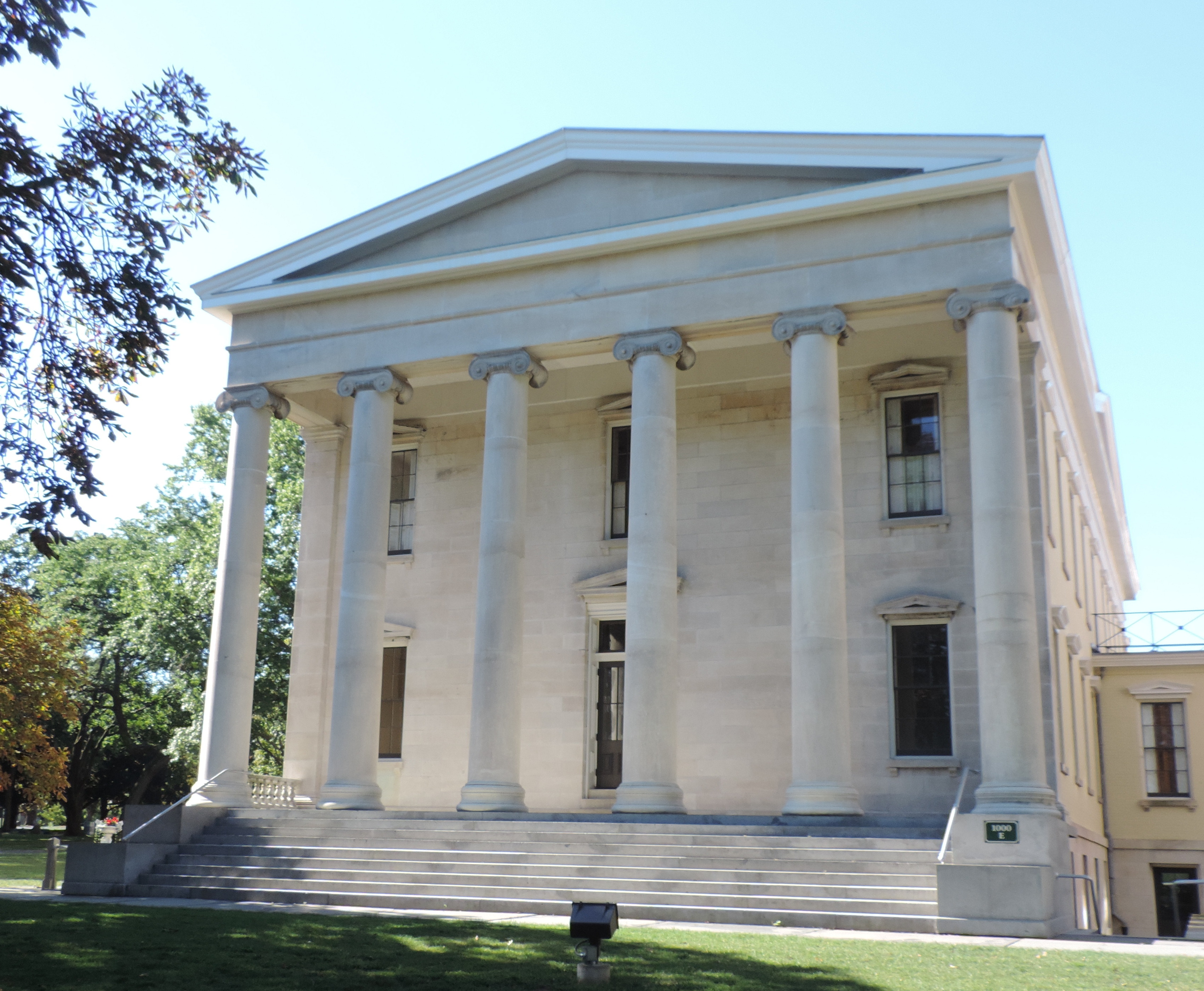
Building E, one of four structures in Temple Row considered for demolition in the 1960s

Twigg died in 1961, and the next year he was replaced by Sidney Trew. By then, younger sailors were increasingly living with their families, and retirement benefits had reduced demand by so much that each remaining resident had their own room. During that time, the trustees proposed redeveloping part of the site, including constructing an apartment building on some vacant land. The trustees tried to have the surrounding land rezoned for retail but were rejected twice; the proposal did not proceed due to financial difficulties. They ignored local residents' pleas that the area around the complex be rezoned to prohibit high-rises. City officials alternatively suggested turning the grounds into a park, allowing the trustees to pay reduced property taxes. By the mid-1960s, the complex had an annual maintenance outlay of $1.1 million, which the leases in Manhattan could not cover. The trustees unsuccessfully tried to sell the Staten Island property to the city.

The complex admitted its first female resident in 1965, The trustees also contemplated allowing married couples to live at the complex, which previously had been restricted to men without spouses. The plans included a new clinic, apartments, and cottages. The new structures would replace dormitory buildings A, B, D, and E, which had been cited for building-code violations. In October 1965, the New York City Landmarks Preservation Commission (LPC) designated buildings A–E and the chapel as six of the city's first 20 official landmarks. Snug Harbor's trustees generally opposed the four dormitories' designations, which the Board of Estimate ratified that December. In 1966, Snug Harbor's trustees asked the court for permission to charge fees and admit sailors' wives for the first time. New York Attorney General Louis J. Lefkowitz endorsed admitting women but initially opposed the planned rental fees; he later approved the fees.

The institution began charging rent in May 1967, and residents unsuccessfully sued to stop it. Concurrently, the New York Supreme Court ruled that the trustees could not be compelled to pay the maintenance costs that were mandated as a result of the landmark designations. The ruling effectively voided the designation, allowing redevelopment to resume, but the LPC sued to have the designation restored. The Cultural Arts Council made a competing proposal in December 1967, which called for the buildings to be converted into a cultural center. The Supreme Court's Appellate Division upheld the landmark designations in 1968. Separately, Lefkowitz sued the trustees on allegations of "mismanagement and waste"; the suit was dropped for a lack of evidence. The idea of donating the landmarked buildings to the city was first proposed in late 1968. The proposal was not given serious consideration at the time, but Snug Harbor trustees dropped their plans to demolish some buildings. Trew resigned the same year, and Leo Kraszeski took over, quickly being promoted to Snug Harbor's directorship.

==== 1970s proposals and sales ====
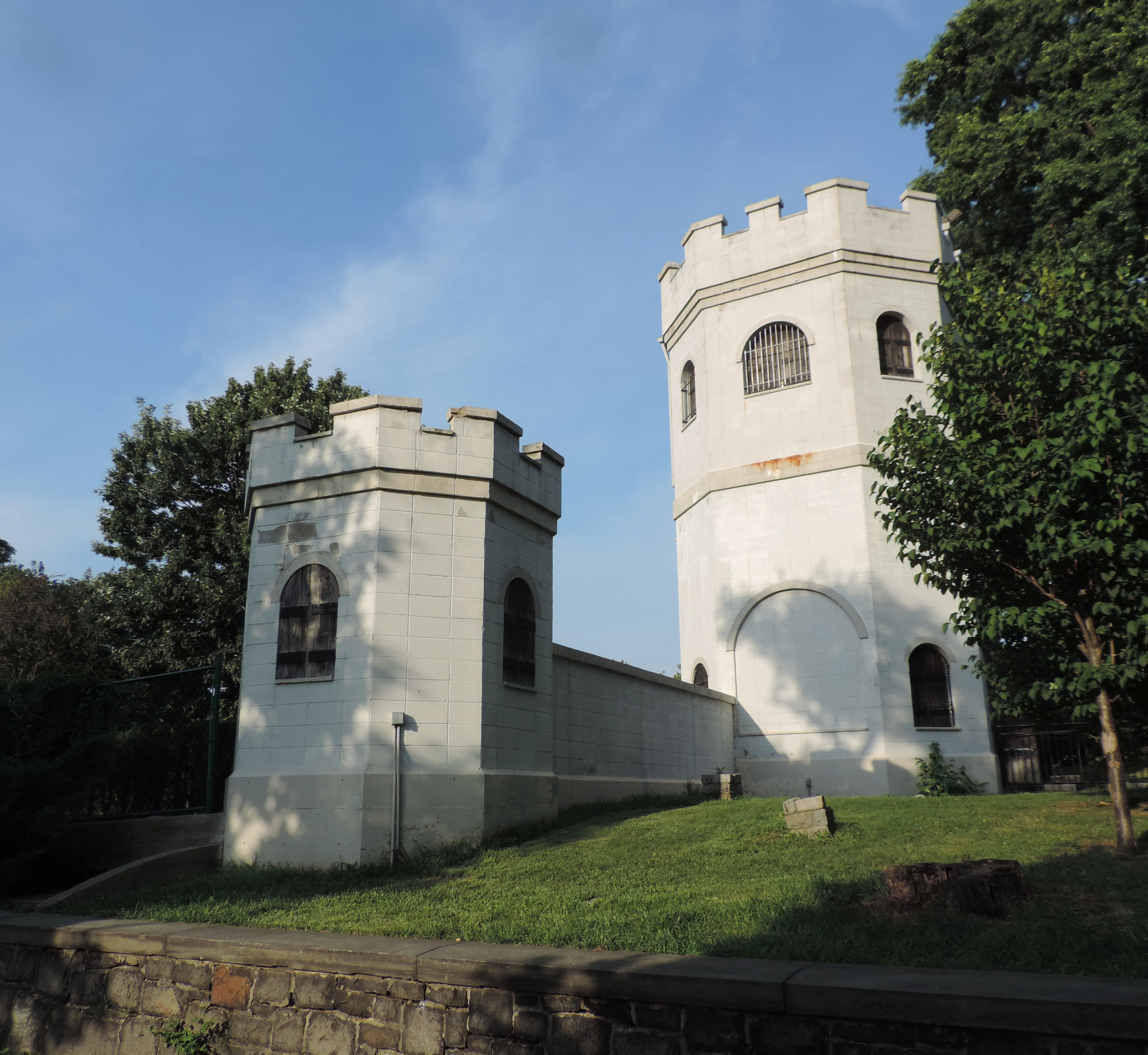
Castle guarding Secret Garden entrance

By the 1970s, the New York State Department of Health found that Snug Harbor's infirmary building did not meet modern building codes. The trustees were losing money operating the Staten Island campus and could barely afford a new infirmary. Snug Harbor's trustees drew up plans for a new infirmary in 1970, which were rejected by both the LPC and the Health Department. By then, the Staten Island Museum—one of the founding members of the Staten Island Institute of Arts & Sciences, which wanted the city to buy the entire site—wished to move into one of the buildings. The city government announced plans in February 1971 to acquire 13 acres (5.3 ha) of the site, including the six landmarked buildings. The trustees asked the Manhattan surrogate's court for permission to sell the existing site and relocate to Sea Level, North Carolina, which the trustees chose after considering several other sites in the American South. Lefkowitz opposed the move, accusing the trustees of neglecting the site, and many of the 170 remaining residents also lodged objections.

The builder Sigmund Sommer offered to buy 65 acres (26 ha) of the remaining land in February 1972, with plans to develop 21 buildings there. The city-owned site was designated as parkland the next month. The city finalized the purchase of its portion of the site that September, and the Manhattan surrogate's court approved the Snug Harbor trustees' relocation in November. Following objections to Sommer's plans, the city announced plans to acquire his land as well, and the Board of Estimate designated Sommer's site as parkland in August 1973. The city government proposed $7.2 million for Snug Harbor in its 1973–1974 capital budget, which paid for Sommer's land. In total, the two land acquisitions totaled either $8.7 million, $9.2 million, or $9.7 million.

The sailors' home remained open temporarily, despite multiple inspections that discovered violations of health codes, as the construction of the Sea Level facility had been delayed. Officials from the city government and the retirement home also argued over who should repair the buildings, some of which were unusable. The 1975 New York City fiscal crisis left the city government unable to finance even minor maintenance; it eventually managed to procure $82,000 for emergency repairs in mid-1976. The state legislature also approved $4.5 million for repairs in 1975. By that decade, the complex regularly hosted parties and other events.

=== Relocation of institution ===
In June 1976, the institution moved to Sea Level, having dwindled to about 100 or 200 people. The institution's expenses had increased to $9,000 annually per resident. Two sailors initially held out, even after losing essential services and receiving eviction notices; they, too, left in September 1976. Kraszeski remained with the relocated institution until 1986. The original institution considered returning to building C in the late 1990s, shuttering its remaining retirement-home operations. This did not occur, and the trustees stopped operating the retirement home in 2000s, shifting their focus to distributing funds to sailors.

The Snug Harbor institution continued to operate until 2019, when it closed permanently due to damage from Hurricane Florence and Hurricane Dorian. The original board of trustees, known formally as Trustees of the Sailors' Snug Harbor in the City of New York, still exists as of 2023 and is headquartered in Manhattan. It continues to provide financial support to sailors using funds from the endowment. The Sailors' Snug Harbor Archives are preserved at the Stephen B. Luce Library at the State University of New York's Maritime College.

== Use as cultural center ==
After the city acquired the land, the Staten Island Museum announced plans to move there, while Children's Aid agreed to maintain Snug Harbor's burial ground. Ten trustees were appointed to the Snug Harbor Center Development Committee in January 1975. The group was incorporated that December as a nonprofit organization, the Snug Harbor Cultural Center, to maintain the facility and host events. The cultural center requested that the sailors' home lend them two paintings, a tray, a uniform, and a portrait of Thomas Melville. The center took over the complex's operations in July 1976 and began offering private tours of the complex that August. In conjunction with the United States Bicentennial, the complex hosted its first public event on September 12, 1976, with 15,000 attendees.

=== Early years ===
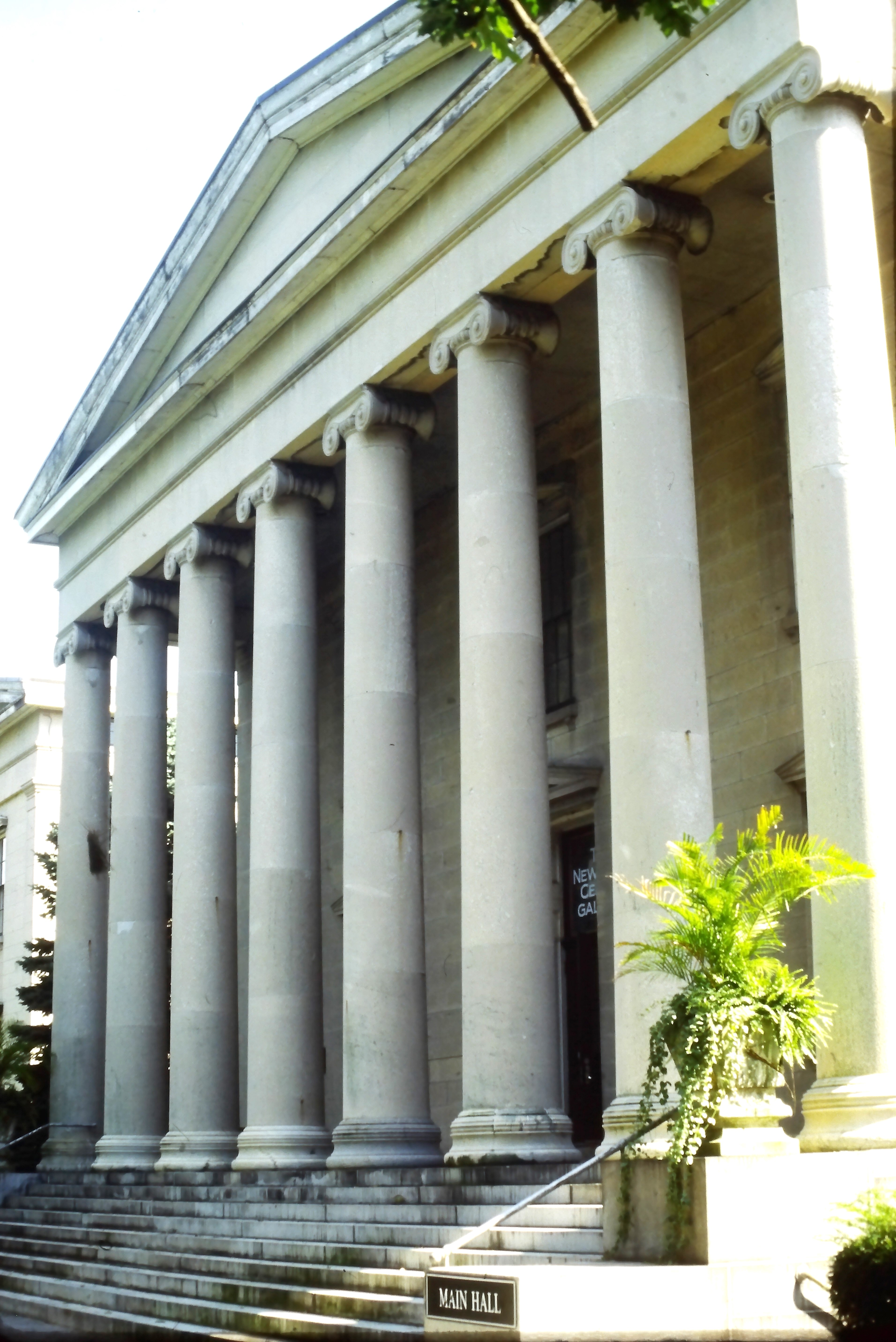
Building C, whose main hall hosted exhibitions as part of the Snug Harbor Cultural Center

From the outset, Snug Harbor faced funding shortages, with a full renovation estimated at $13.2 million. Emergency repairs were budgeted at $40,000, while facade stabilization was estimated at $750,000. Although the grounds were in good condition, the buildings needed upgrades to varying degrees. The Staten Island Botanical Garden became the center's first major tenant in 1977, although it did not have physical facilities initially. The cultural center's first director, Michael T. Sheehan, was appointed the next year. Although the entire complex had been designated as a National Historic Landmark district in 1976, making it eligible for federal preservation funds, cultural center officials were not notified for more than two years.

In 1979, the US government provided a $100,000 grant for the renovation of Snug Harbor's chapel, though it rejected another grant of $588,000 to restore building C. Another $650,000 was donated by the Staten Island War Memorial Association, later increased to $800,000, which was used to renovate the complex's chapel. The state government released $1.14 million of the state legislature's 1975 grant to pay for emergency repairs. The city and state government provided funding to pay annual expenses, while the cultural center raised additional funds raised independently from donations, memberships, and other sources. Although a 1980 bill allowed the federal government to take over Snug Harbor as part of the Gateway National Recreation Area, this was not being planned yet.

The cultural center initially struggled with funds, being unable to pay employees' payroll tax or even buy heating oil during particularly rough periods. By the early 1980s, several art galleries had opened at Snug Harbor, and the Music Hall was about to be restored. The Newhouse Gallery in Building C's main hall frequently hosted exhibitions, and the grounds staged live performances and shows during the summers. In addition to annual concerts hosted by the New York Philharmonic and Metropolitan Opera, the complex hosted events presented by the Snug Harbor Cultural Center or other institutions. Dozens of dormitory rooms were rented to artists, and there were long-term plans to relocate multiple museums, cultural institutions, and art galleries there.

=== Mid-1980s to 1990s ===
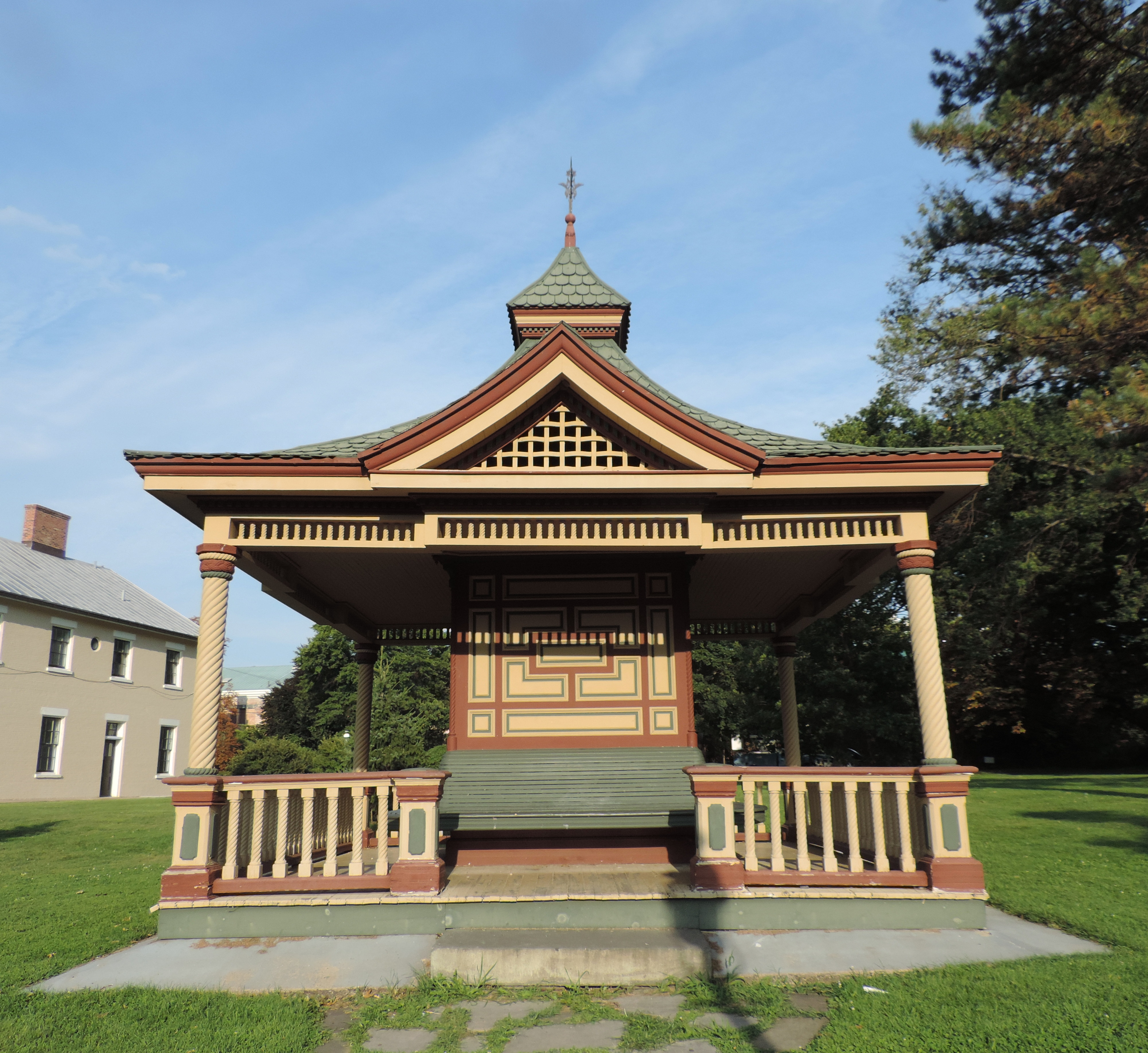
A gazebo at the complex

The cultural center raised millions of dollars to renovate multiple buildings in the 1980s. A renovation for the Staten Island Museum was announced in 1984, covering buildings A and B. Another renovation was planned for the separate Staten Island Children's Museum, located within Snug Harbor's former maintenance building. The chapel was restored as well; it was rededicated as the Veterans Memorial Hall in May 1985 and reopened as a concert hall that October. Other projects planned at the complex included new parking lots, the repainting of buildings A–E, upgrades for the Botanical Garden, and restoration of building C's main hall. The cultural center hired the preservation consultant Phillip Neuberg in 1985 to oversee the multi-year renovation program. The Children's Museum opened there in 1986, and the recreation hall reopened that year as an event venue called the Great Hall. The cultural center's annual operating expenses had increased to over $1.7 million by then. Renovations of buildings A and B for the Staten Island Museum were delayed by cost overruns, and the structures remained empty for decades.

Rafael Viñoly won a design competition in 1987 to redesign the Music Hall as part of a $12 million project. The Music Hall renovation was downsized and delayed after costs reached nearly $20 million. The cultural center presented a multi-phased renovation plan in 1989, which included landscaping the grounds, renovating the existing buildings, and constructing new buildings for up to $100 million. Quennell Rothschild Associates presented a master plan for the site that year, and the Dormitory Authority of the State of New York received authorization to issue bonds to fund the renovation of several cottages. Four cottages were subsequently converted to artist dormitories, and some recital halls were also built. Thirteen of the buildings had been renovated by 1990. A Chinese garden was under development, the gatehouse was being restored, and fundraising for the Music Hall was underway. Workers also began restoring building C's main hall after part of the ceiling fell down.

The complex scaled back its event offerings after experiencing major funding reductions in the early 1990s, and many renovation projects stalled; there were 250,000 annual visitors by then. Building D, which was leased to the Noble Maritime Collection in 1991, was in such poor condition that volunteers spent several years restoring it. The same year, the city government hired Jan Hird Pokorny to renovate ten of the buildings. Building C's main hall was rededicated in 1993, followed the next year by the complex's Botanical Garden pond. In addition, work on the Music Hall began in 1996, after the project was downsized to $3 million. The Music Hall partially reopened the next year. The New York Chinese Scholar's Garden was completed at Snug Harbor in June 1999. Other renovation projects in the late 1990s included a new dock and restorations of the cottages.

=== 2000s to present ===
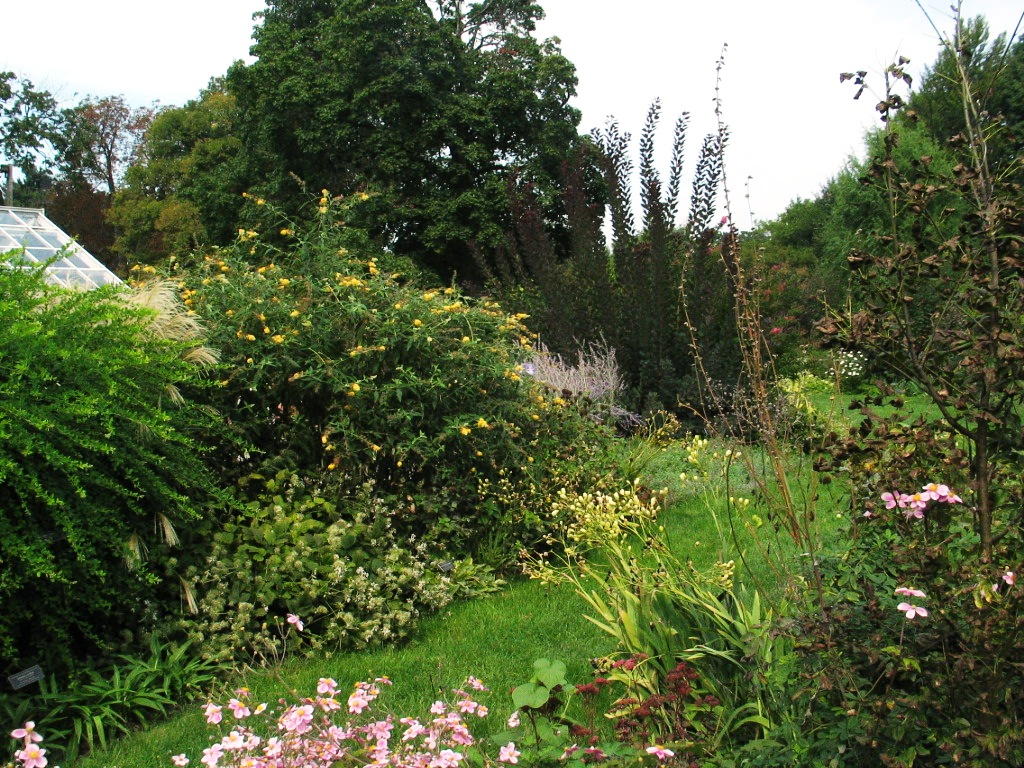
Greenery in Snug Harbor

Connie Gretz's Secret Garden was dedicated at Snug Harbor in 2000, and the Noble Maritime Collection opened that October. During the early 2000s, the barn occupied by the Staten Island Children's Museum was expanded, and a basement gallery and an enclosed breezeway were built between the museum's two buildings. A renovation of building P and the addition of the Tuscan Garden were announced in 2003, and a second phase of the Music Hall project was completed the next year. The cultural center also began seeking tenants for building E, which was decrepit and unfit for habitation. Three other landscape projects at Snug Harbor, announced in 1998, were delayed due to a lawsuit that was voided in 2004. Snug Harbor also received city funding to renovate the landscape and buildings A and P, though its leadership sought further funding to renovate four more buildings. The city provided more funds for the long-stalled renovation of buildings A and B in 2007, and a conservation center between buildings B and H was built that year.

A memorial garden to victims of the September 11 attacks opened in 2008, and the Tuscan Garden opened in October 2010. Work on the Staten Island Museum buildings resumed in 2011. The Veterans Memorial Hall was damaged by a burst pipe in 2014; it remained closed for years because the cultural center did not prioritize repairing it. After cultural center officials reported a severe funding shortage in 2015, saying that the city's $950,000 annual appropriation was insufficient, the city increased the annual appropriation and provided $10.5 million in capital funds. Although the cultural center had struggled to attract visitors in previous years, city officials believed the redevelopment of nearby St. George would entice more visitors. The Staten Island Museum moved into Building A in September 2015, following a full reconstruction.

Work on a restoration of the Music Hall commenced in 2019; that project was expected to be complete in two years but was delayed. Also postponed was the Staten Island Museum's plan to expand into building B by 2022. Snug Harbor remained open during the COVID-19 pandemic in New York City but postponed many programs and temporarily closed its buildings and Chinese garden. The city government provided funding in 2021 for the renovation of buildings B, G, and K, and the Children's Museum, and it subsequently allocated funds for mechanical upgrades. The Snug Harbor institution's trustees donated the burial ground to the city in 2024, and a boardwalk, observation platform, and new entrance opened the next year.

== Site and layout ==
Snug Harbor is located in Randall Manor on the North Shore of Staten Island in New York City. It faces the Kill van Kull, a strait separating New York and New Jersey, and is accessed by Richmond Terrace, a west–east avenue. The grounds originally covered 130 acres (53 ha) but have been reduced over the years to 83 acres (34 ha). (Note: Figures in other sources add up to 80 acres (32 ha).) Various chestnut, oak, and pine trees are planted across the grounds, and there are landscape features such as hills and ponds. One of Snug Harbor's trees, a paulownia, is designated as a "great tree" by the New York City Department of Parks and Recreation. The complex also includes a gazebo and numerous lawns, including the 7.5-acre (3.0 ha) South Meadow. Snug Harbor also has botanical gardens (see § Staten Island Botanical Garden), which span 55 acres (22 ha), along with parking lots.

=== Iron fence and gatehouses ===
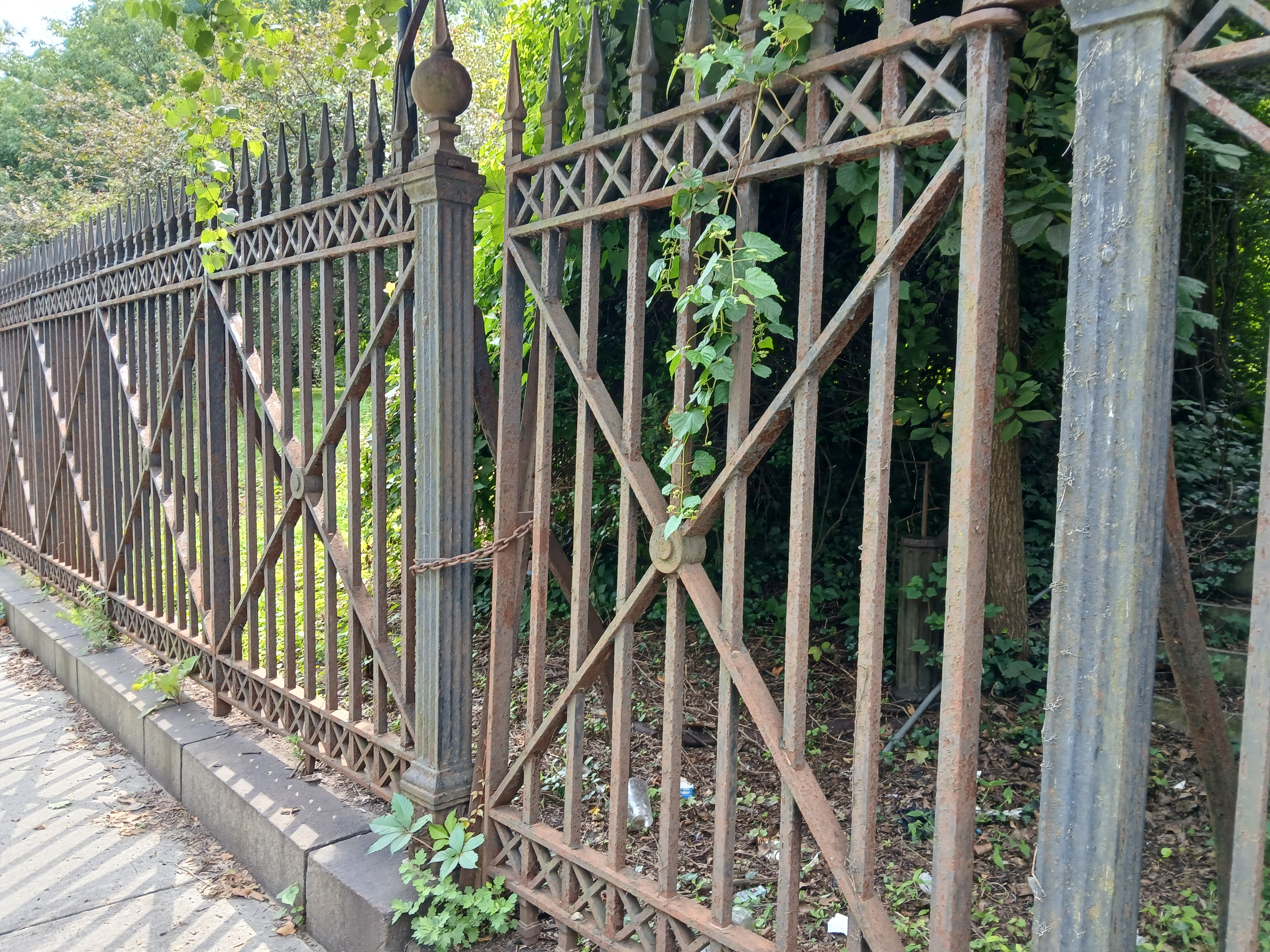
Iron fence on Richmond Terrace

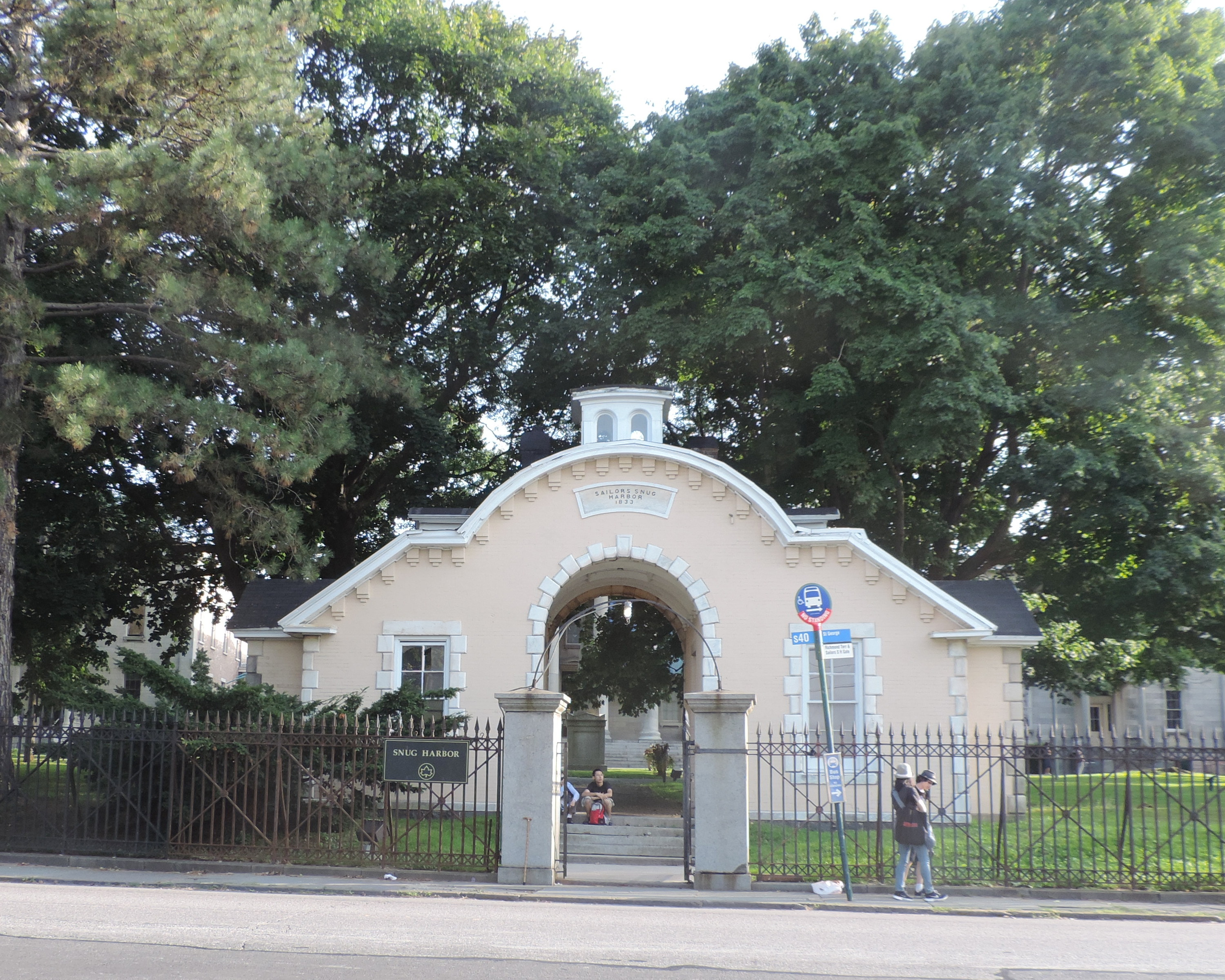
Northern gatehouse

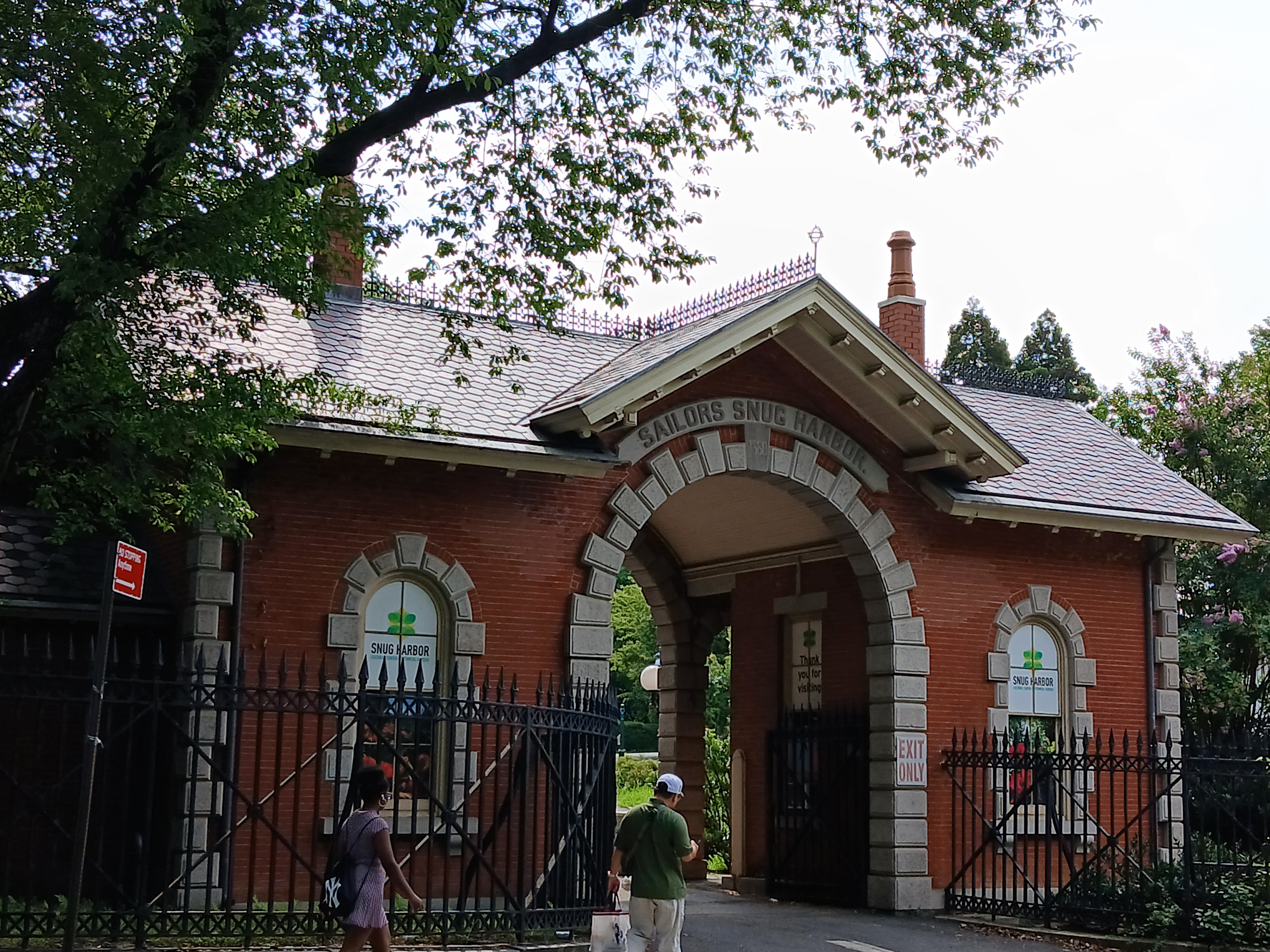
Western gatehouse

An iron fence, built in the Greek Revival style, surrounds the property. The fence, dating from 1842, is variously attributed to William Alexander or Frederick Diaper. Several gates flanked by granite posts are embedded in the fence. The grounds are accessed by numerous gatehouses that date to 1851–1875 and are designed in the Italianate, Second Empire, and Romanesque styles. There are five gates: two for vehicles and three for pedestrians only. The vehicular gates are the west gate on Snug Harbor Road and the east gate on Tysen Street. The others are the north gate on Richmond Terrace, the south gate on Henderson Avenue, and the Kissel gate on Kissel Avenue at the far western end of the property.

The main vehicular entrance is the western gatehouse, which dates from 1880. The north gatehouse on Richmond Terrace, built in 1874, is a designated city landmark. Located in front of building C and set back from the fence, it is trapezoidal with a high central archway, flanked by guard rooms with rectangular windows. The quoins surrounding the archway and window openings are made of leftover marble and sandstone from the original structures. The top of the northern gatehouse has brick corbels supporting a cornice, along with a square cupola. A path leads through the northern gatehouse to a marble monument to Robert Randall.

=== Artwork ===
The grounds included a 1893 zinc fountain featuring the god Neptune, located between Temple Row and the governor's house. The New York Times described the statue as sitting "in the middle, astride a shell held aloft by sea monsters, his trident raised. Jets of water spurt from the fountain's center and from bouquets of metal calla lilies to its sides." A replica of the statue, cast in 1994 due to the original's extreme deterioration, sits on the East Lawn. The grounds also featured a bronze statue of Randall designed by Augustus Saint-Gaudens in 1884. After the original was relocated to Sea Level in the 1980s, a replica was installed in 1983.

=== Burial ground ===
Deceased residents were buried in a graveyard called Monkey Hill, covering about 6 acres (2.4 ha). Containing up to 8,000 corpses, it is located in nearby Allison Pond Park, which used to be part of the complex. The pond supplied water to Snug Harbor until 1939. Much of the land was sold to the city in 1975 and turned into a public park with hiking trails, while the Snug Harbor trustees retained the actual burial plot until 2024. The headstones were removed and placed into storage in the early 20th century due to vandalism; the majority of the bodies lie in unmarked graves. A brick wall surrounds the plot.

== Architecture ==
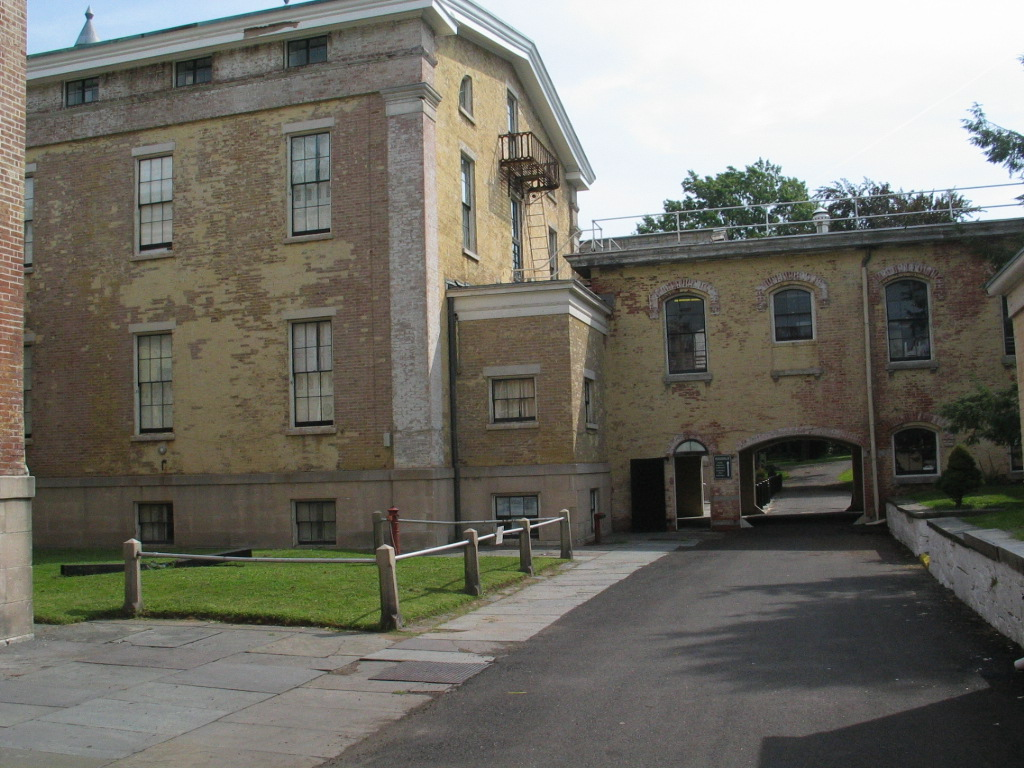
Buildings at Snug Harbor on Shinbone Alley, behind Temple Row

The Snug Harbor Cultural Center has more than two dozen remaining structures from the retirement home. (Note: It is variously cited as having 26 or 28 structures.) Minard Lafever's original structure, building C, was designed in the Greek Revival style. Later structures were designed in a variety of styles, such as the Beaux-Arts, Gothic Revival, Italianate, Second Empire, and Victorian styles; many of the buildings have since been demolished. At its peak, the site may have had either 50, 55, more than 60, or 70 buildings. During the complex's time as a retirement home, it had nautical decorations such as paintings, ship models, compasses, and sextants.

=== Temple Row ===
The five connected Greek Revival buildings at Snug Harbor, known as Temple Row, are located at the northern end of the site (near Richmond Terrace) and are labeled as buildings A–E from west to east. The five buildings were designed by Lafever and Richard Smyth and were constructed from 1831 to 1880. The buildings are parallel to each other, but due to the differing facade designs, buildings B and D appear set back from buildings A, C, and E. Building C was an administration building, and the other Temple Row buildings were dormitories. Brick passageways, known as "hyphens", link the five structures. Although the buildings use Greek Revival motifs, they are not strictly historically accurate; for example, the rear facades have incomplete motifs.

These buildings were originally incorrectly attributed to Martin E. Thompson, an architect whom Lafever had followed. According to the researcher Barnett Shepherd, Lafever was mentioned in documents from building C's construction, while Thompson, who was not, was inaccurately given credit in a book by the historian Talbot Hamlin.

==== Building C ====
Administration Building C

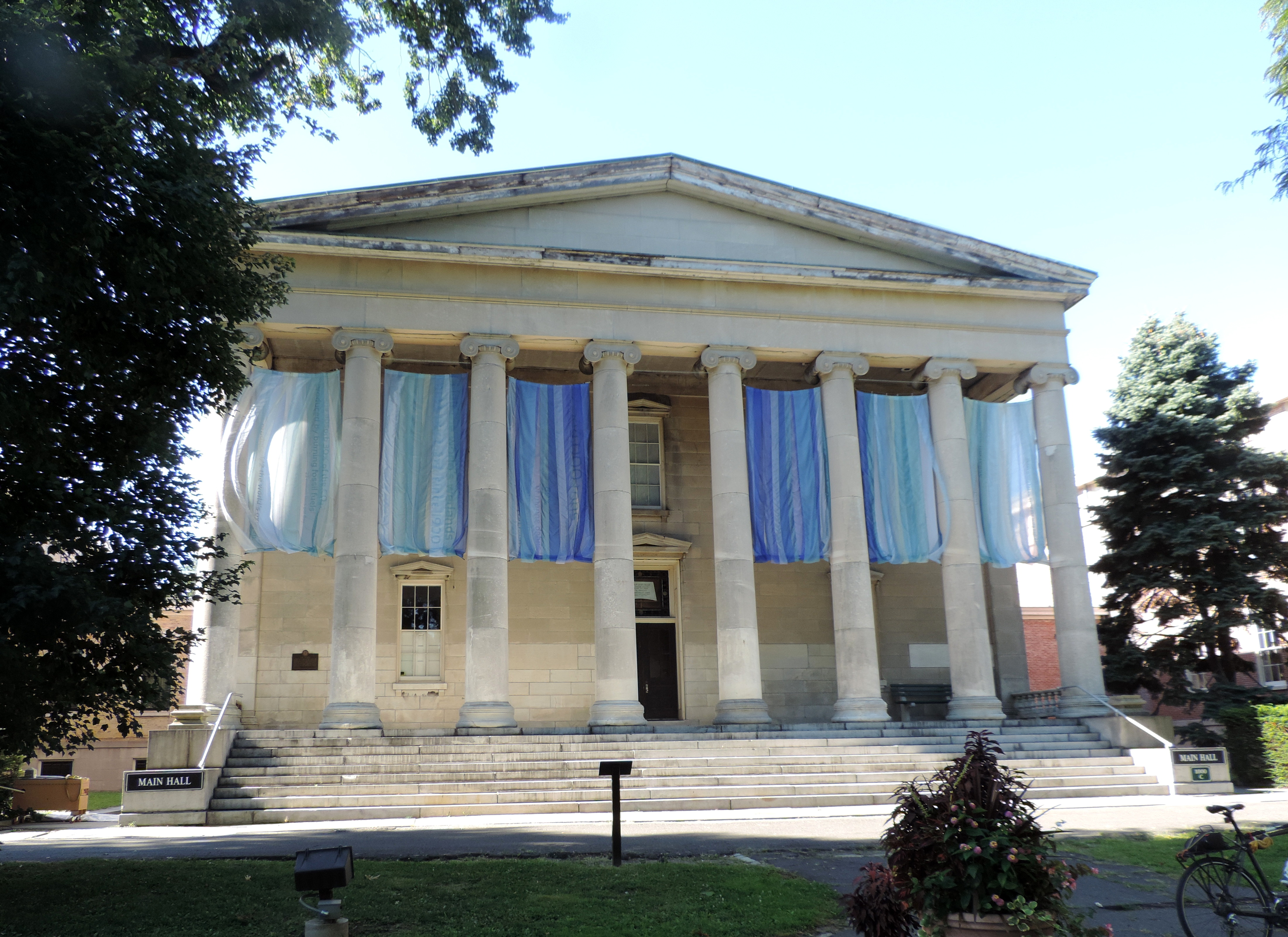
Exterior

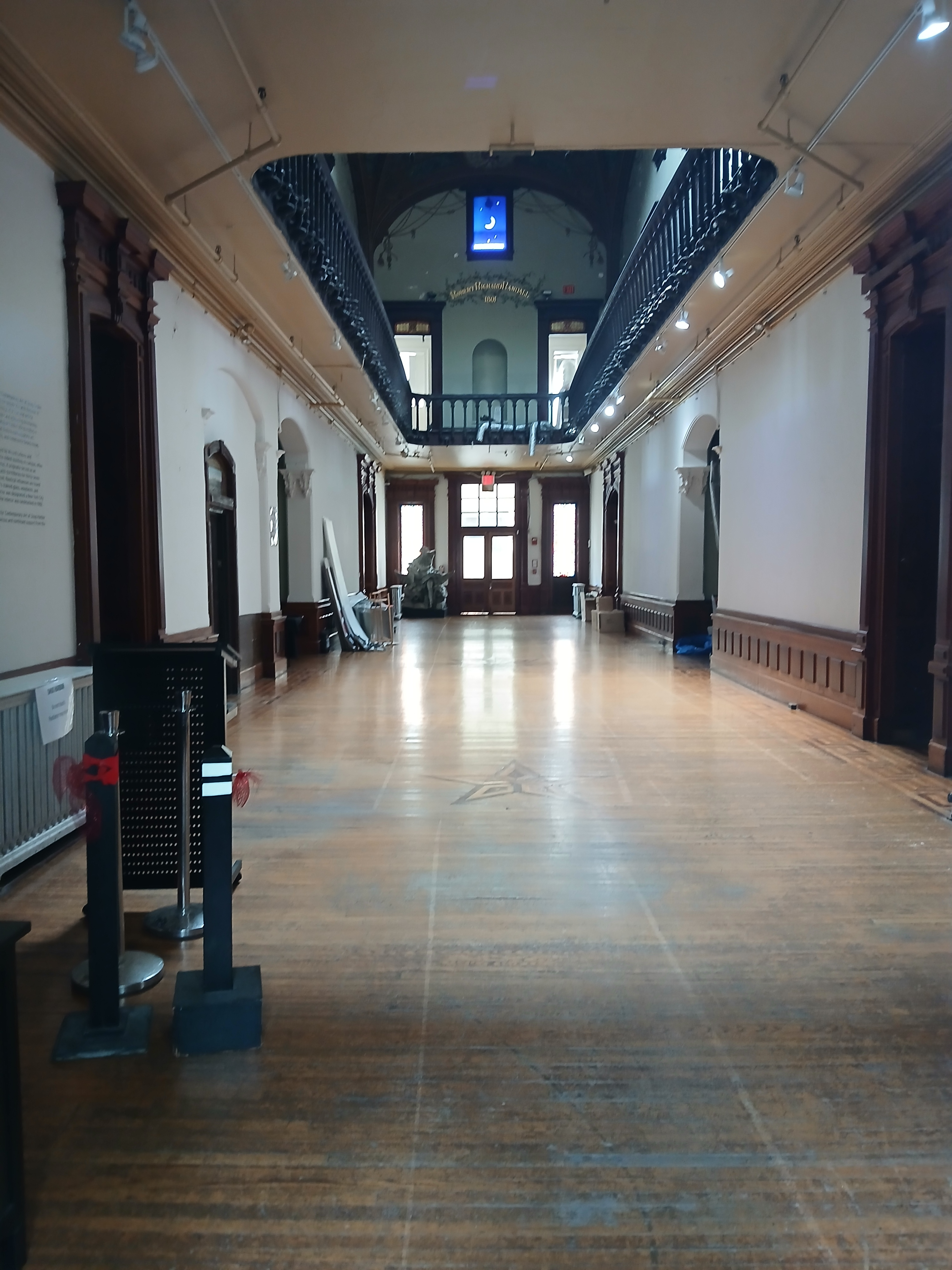
Interior rotunda

Building C, also known as the Administration Building, was completed in 1833 and is Lafever's oldest surviving work. It houses part of the Newhouse Center for Contemporary Art. The building consists of two stories, a raised basement, and an attic; it is rectangular in plan with a gable roof. The main entrance contains a set of steps underneath a stone portico, consisting of eight columns supporting a classic pediment. Early renderings show that the columns had no fluting and that the frieze and door frames were unornamented. The sides of building C are eight bays wide. The rear elevation is made of brick and has simpler Greek decorations.

Building C was originally an administrative building with 34 rooms, including bedrooms, kitchens, dining rooms, washrooms, and recreational rooms. The entrance leads to a 2 1/2 -story main hall with ash floors and a vaulted ceiling, which occupies one-third of the first floor. Doorways lead to other rooms on the first floor and to the other buildings, and a hallway connects with the infirmary. A staircase on the left (east) side of the main hall, with iron railings and wooden wainscoted walls, connects the first and second floors. The second floor consists of a balustraded balcony surrounding the main hall, with fourteen doorways. The ceiling, shaped like an inverted keel, rises from brackets at each of the main hall's corners. It contains a central, domed skylight and a 20-by-100-foot (6.1 by 30.5 m) mural. Various maritime-themed decorative elements and carvings are located on the ceiling and walls, while clerestory windows on the north and south walls resemble the sun and moon. Some interior decorations have been replaced over the years.

==== Buildings A, B, D, and E ====
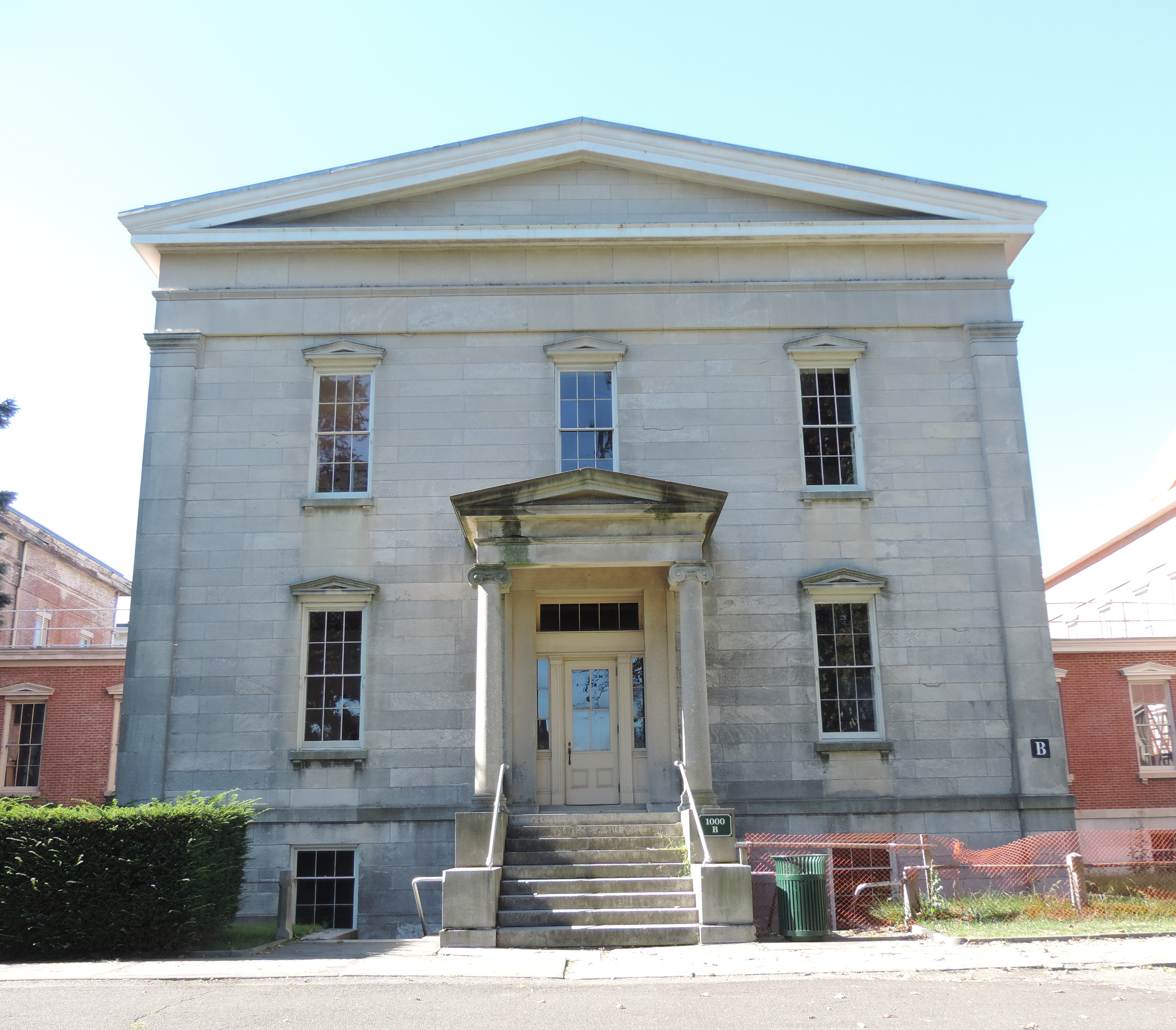
Building B

Buildings B and D were both designed by Minard Lafever and completed around 1840–1842. (Note: The AIA Guide to New York City cites building B as having been completed in 1840 and building D as having been completed in 1842. Barnett Shepherd cites the buildings as having been completed in 1840 and 1842, respectively, though he does not label the buildings by letter.) Building B is not open to the public, and building D houses the Noble Maritime Collection. Both are two stories high with an attic and a high basement, and they are rectangular in plan with gable roofs. The front facades are made of smooth stone and contain a small porch with a gable and a simple stoop. The structures were initially intended as dormitory buildings. Inside both buildings, a hallway runs from north to south, and an east–west transverse hallway connects with the hyphens.

Buildings A and E were both designed by Richard Smyth and completed in 1879–1880. Building A is used by the Staten Island Museum, while building E, long used as a storage facility, is not open to the public. Both buildings consist of two stories and raised basement and an attic, and they are rectangular in plan with gable roofs. The main entrances of both buildings contain a set of steps underneath a stone portico, consisting of six columns supporting a classic pediment, decorated in the Ionic order. The structures were originally dormitory buildings.

=== Veterans Memorial Hall ===
The Veterans Memorial Hall (completed 1856), formerly the chapel, was designed by local builder James Solomon. It is located south of the Snug Harbor Music Hall, near the campus's east end. Stylistically, it is a "transitional" building, with stylistic elements mainly rooted in Italianate architecture as well as some elements of Greek Revival architecture. The design of the chapel is based on that of a typical New England church. The chapel contains a gable roof. The front entrance consists of a tower with a belfry projecting from the front end of the chapel. The entrance leads to a plaster-walled vestibule with three round arches and three plaques. The brick facade has six round-arched windows on each side, separated by pilasters. At the rear is a one-story extension with an office and sacristy. The chapel has stained glass windows.

Veterans Memorial Hall

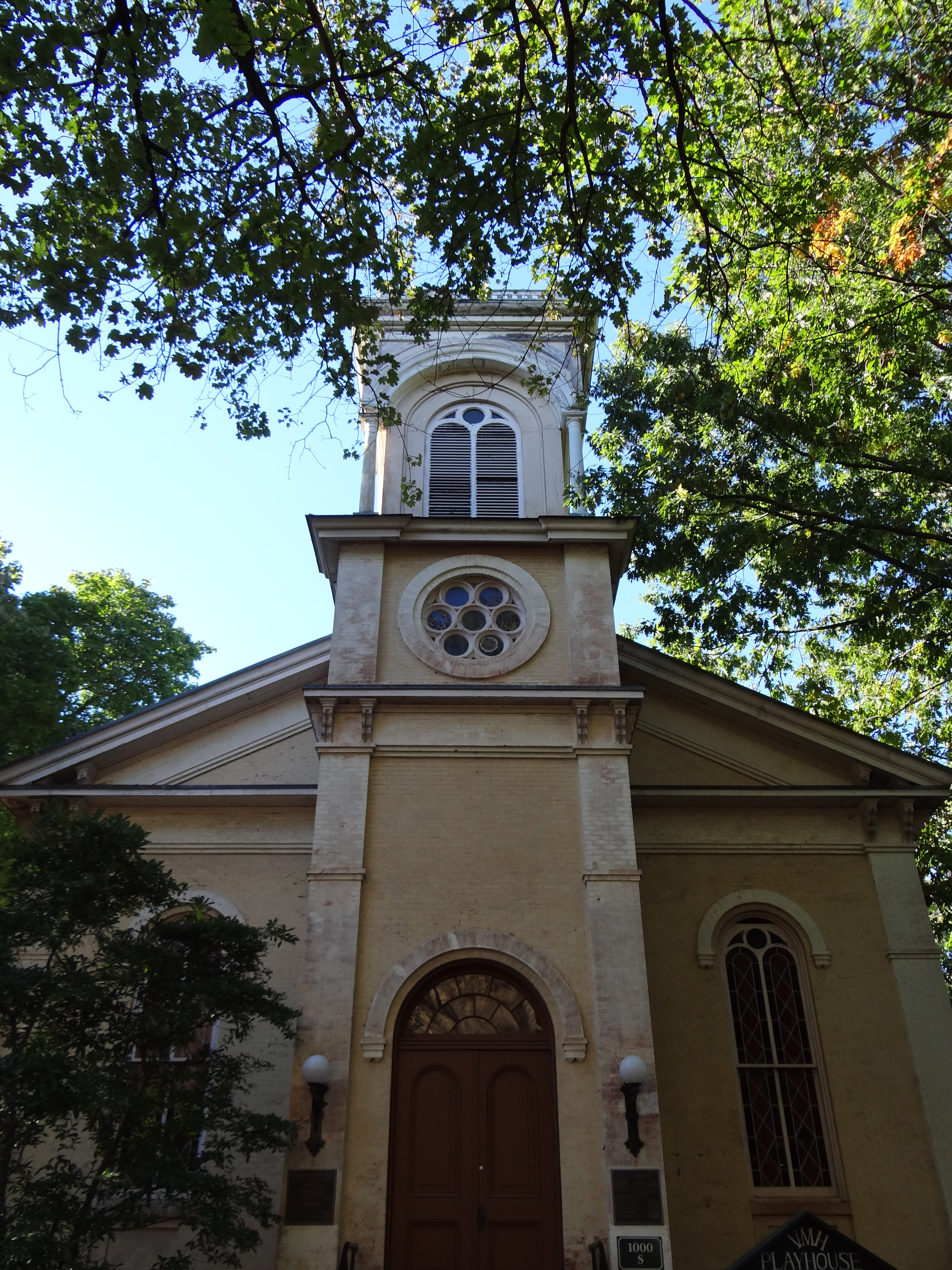
Exterior

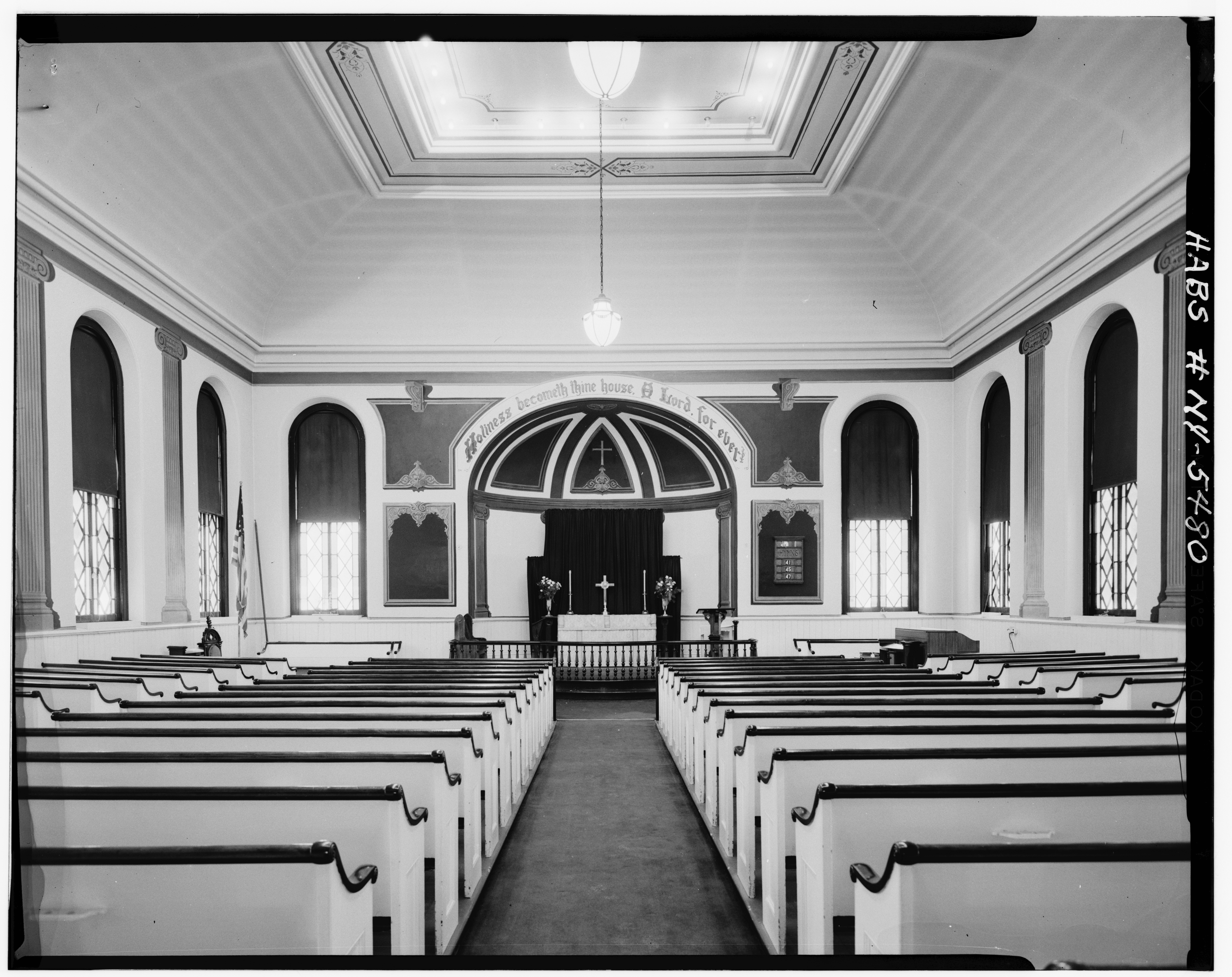
Interior

Inside is a rectangular space that could fit 600 people; in the 1980s, the capacity was reduced to 205. The space also contains wooden pews and wainscoted walls. The coved ceiling has a recessed panel with two lamps. A gallery on the north end is supported by two cast-iron columns and has recessed wood paneling. An apse at the south end surrounds a raised former altar area. At the center of an apse is a doorway to the office, which has plastered walls with bookcases built into them, as well as a stone fireplace. There are also plaques honoring Vietnam veterans. As part of the hall's 1980s renovation, a lobby, box office, and other front of house facilities were added beneath the existing chapel.

When built, the main entrance was through a central round arch at the front, topped by a pediment with Doric pilasters. A round-arched window and lintel flanked the main entrance, while a full-height pilaster was located at each corner. One observer in 1873 called the chapel a "plain but handsome brick building, without any cupola or belfry." The chapel's bell tower and stained glass date to 1883, and the entire chapel was moved in 1893. The Veterans Memorial Hall was renovated into a concert hall in 1985, though it is not open to the public as of 2018.

=== Other buildings ===
Another set of buildings, labeled F through H, are respectively located south of buildings D through B, and are connected to each other and to the buildings immediately north of them. These buildings are linked by tunnels, which are closed to the public. When the cultural center opened, building H was used as a visitor center and concession shop, while building G was used by the Newhouse Center.

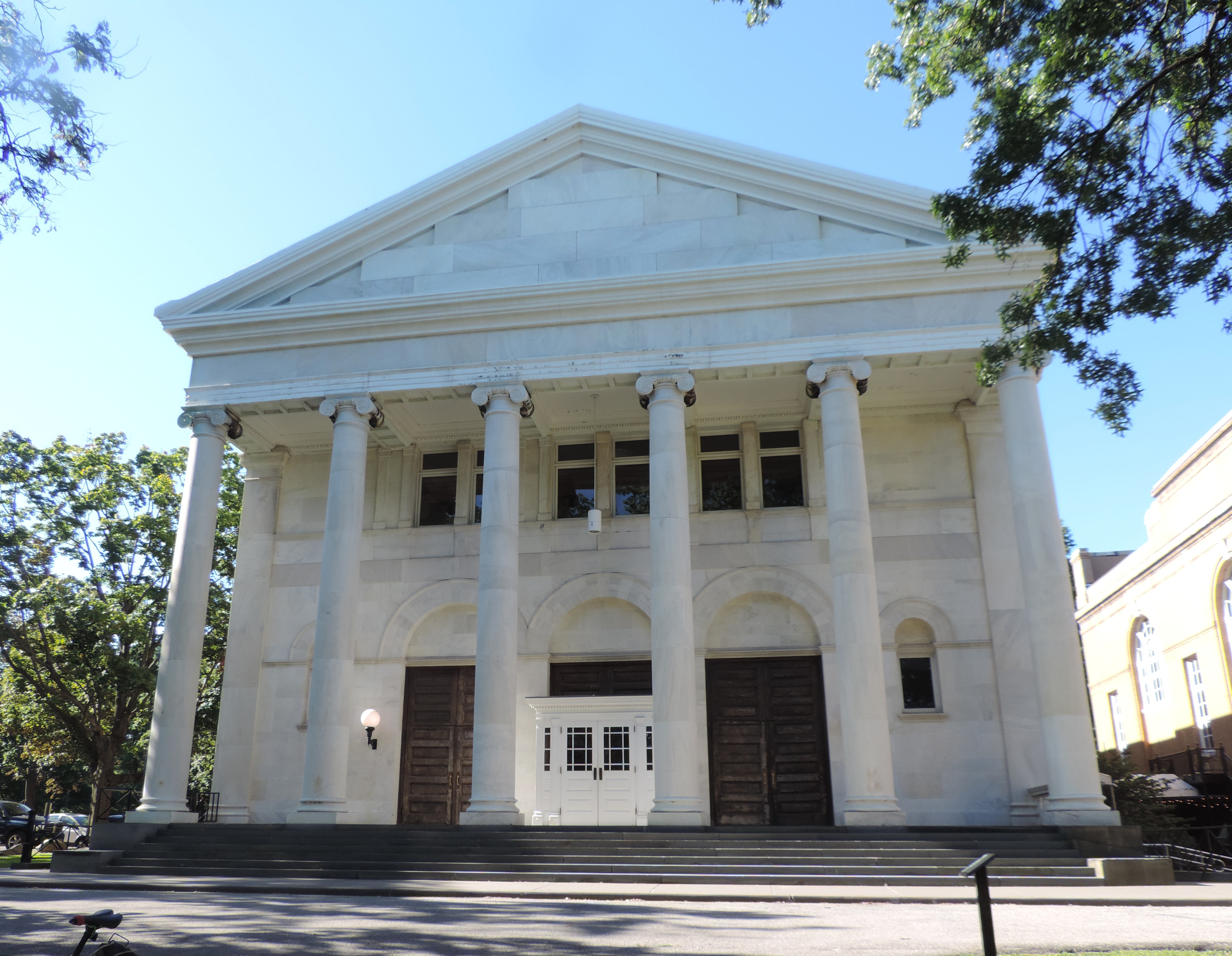
Music Hall

The Great Hall and Music Hall are located east of buildings H through F. The Great Hall was designed in the Beaux-Arts style by Louis Jallade and completed in 1917, with Doric columns and a large window on one facade, and brick walls on the other facades. Inside are a chandelier, wood panels, and vaulted ceiling; the Great Hall's main hall can accommodate 450 people, while the Lower Great Hall below can hold 250 people. The adjacent Music Hall, a 686-seat Greek Revival auditorium, was designed by Robert W. Gibson and opened in 1892. It is the second-oldest music hall in New York City, after Carnegie Hall; the orchestra level originally had 600 seats, while the balcony had 300 seats for trustees and their guests.

A matron's house and a maintenance building are south of buildings H through F and east of the chapel. The Staten Island Children's Museum and World Trade Center Educational Tribute are in the center of the grounds, south of the maintenance building and matron's house, while the Snug Harbor Administration building is south of the museum. On the west end of the site are five cottages; one is used as a gift shop, while the others accommodate uses such as film shoots and intern housing. The Governors' House, a Victorian structure, dates from the 19th century.

=== Former buildings ===
On the campus was formerly the Randall Memorial Church, designed in the Renaissance style by Robert W. Gibson. The building, completed in 1893, was patterned after St. Paul's Cathedral, London. It had a floor plan shaped like a Greek cross, with four arms intersecting at an octagonal vault. The facade was made of brick and marble, with a 135-foot-tall (41 m) copper dome and a pair of turrets, while the interiors were clad in marble.

Over the years, there have also been other structures, including a hospital, dining hall, and gazebo. The hospital, with four wings at its peak, was designed in a Greek Revival style. There was also a theater with a curtain depicting the Vanderbilt family's Staten Island farmhouse.

== Management ==
The Snug Harbor Cultural Center and the Staten Island Botanical Garden merged in 2008 to become the Snug Harbor Cultural Center and Botanical Garden, four years after the merger was first proposed. The combined entity is a Smithsonian Institution–affiliated nonprofit organization that operates the Snug Harbor complex. In fiscal year 2023, it recorded revenue of $5.56 million, expenses of $5.48 million, assets of $5.12 million, and liabilities of $435,000.

The Snug Harbor Cultural Center manages the grounds and some of its own programs, including the Staten Island Botanical Garden and the Newhouse Center. Other occupants, including the Noble Collection, Staten Island Children's Museum, and Staten Island Museum, lease space at the site. Friends of Snug Harbor, a volunteer group, raises funds and hosts events and other activities. There are numerous venues for performing arts, recreation, and other cultural events throughout the complex. The Snug Harbor Cultural Center and the Staten Island and Children's museums are members of the city's Cultural Institutions Group (CIG), a partnership of cultural and educational institutions; the Noble Maritime Collection also became part of the CIG in 2025. Although the grounds are accessible free of charge, some institutions and attractions charge a fee.

=== Staten Island Botanical Garden ===
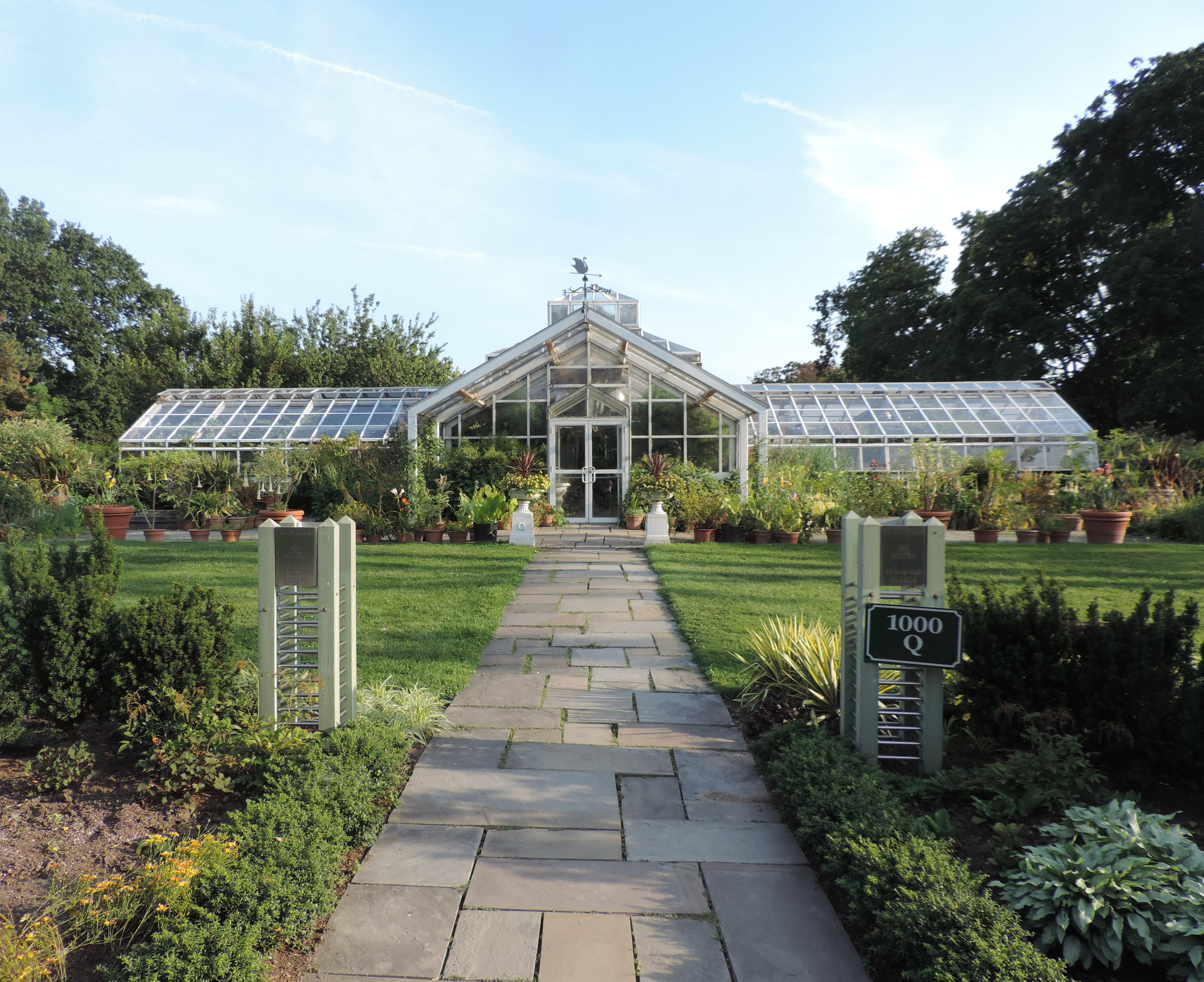
The conservatory

The Staten Island Botanical Garden, part of the cultural center since 1977, is managed directly by the Snug Harbor Cultural Center. Arranged based on Quennell Rothschild Associates' 1989 landscape plan, it includes landscape features such as a pond, lawns, and rows of trees and flowers. There is a conservatory known as the Carl Grillo Glass House, which hosts exhibits about three biomes. The grounds also contain a restaurant within a cottage, along with a 20-acre (8.1 ha) wetland. The Heritage Farm, covering about 2 acres (0.81 ha) at the Botanical Garden, hosts urban-agriculture training programs.

There are over 20 special gardens at the Botanical Garden. Among these are the White Garden, inspired by Vita Sackville-West's garden at Sissinghurst, and the Lions sensory garden, which includes plants selected for their texture, smell, and sound. Connie Gretz's Secret Garden, named for the late wife of a local resident, contains a moat, castle, maze, and walled secret garden. The New York Chinese Scholar's Garden, an authentic, walled Chinese garden, was built in the style of the famous gardens of Suzhou, with features such as pavilions and a pond. The Tuscan Garden contains terraces, pools, potted plants, and other features inspired by a similar garden at Florence's Villa Gamberaia. The Healing Garden includes a path, a wall memorializing Staten Island's 9/11 victims, a sculpture, and saplings from a tree that survived the 9/11 attacks. Other special gardens include butterfly, herb, perennial, portage, rose, and shade gardens and a Victorian pond.

=== Newhouse Center for Contemporary Art ===
The Newhouse Center for Contemporary Art, established 1977, exhibits work by Staten Island residents or about Staten Island and is also a subsidiary of the Cultural Center. The Newhouse Center provides artist-in-residence exhibitions and 15,000 square feet (1,400 m^{2}) of gallery space in buildings C and G. Although the Newhouse was founded with a focus on Staten Island-based artists and art that reflects the history of Staten Island or Snug Harbor, the Newhouse has since refocused more broadly on contemporary art. It can mount large shows and large works, along with outdoor sculpture shows.

=== Noble Maritime Collection ===
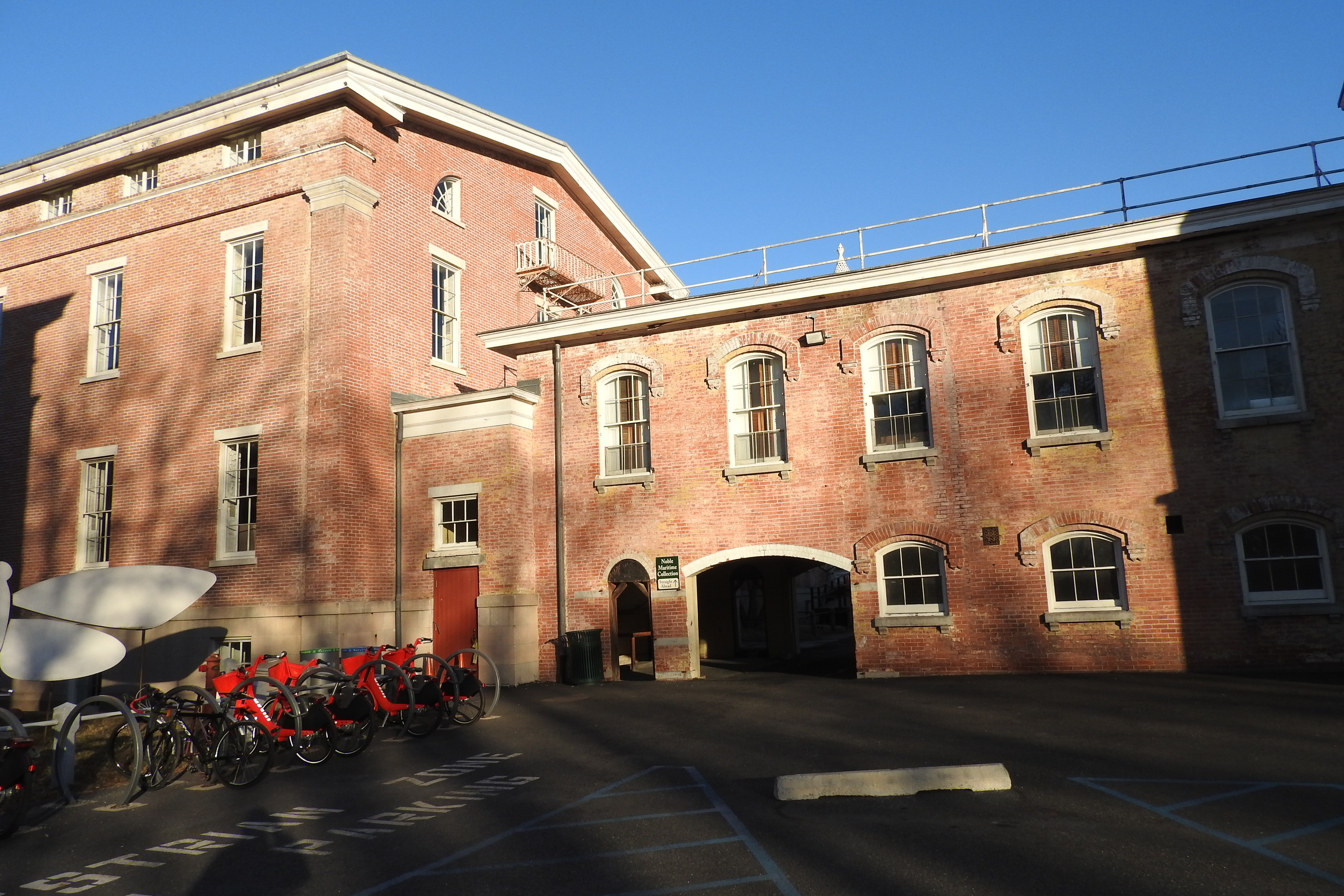
The Noble Maritime Collection is located in building D (pictured), with a particular emphasis on the work of artist, lithographer, and sailor John A. Noble.

The Noble Maritime Collection is a museum in building D, with a particular emphasis on the work of artist, lithographer, and sailor John A. Noble (1913–1983). It opened in 2000 and features Noble's paintings, drawings, and other artworks. The museum also includes exhibits such as an interactive old printing press, a replica of a houseboat Noble used as a studio, ship models, and a salvaged ferryboat light. The Washington Post called the houseboat "a home on the water and an artist's lair all in one", while The New York Sun called the Noble Collection "an unsung gem among New York museums".

=== Staten Island Children's Museum ===
The Staten Island Children's Museum, which has a collection of hands-on exhibits, has been located at Snug Harbor since 1986. Its three-story main building dates from 1913, spanning 20,000 square feet (1,900 m^{2}). An enclosed walkway connects to a 6,000-square-foot (560 m^{2}), two-story barn, dating from 1891, has exhibits of biomes.

=== Staten Island Museum ===
The Staten Island Museum opened a location at Snug Harbor in September 2015, later moving all its operations from its previous St. George location to building A. The museum includes artwork, documents, scientific exhibits, and objects relating to the history of Staten Island.

=== Other organizations and events ===
Snug Harbor is home to the Staten Island Conservatory of Music. The Children's Montessori School, located at Snug Harbor since c. 1978, is a Montessori school with mixed-age classrooms where students work independently. In addition, it contains Art Lab, a school of fine and applied art, which has been operating at Snug Harbor since 2000. The Council on the Arts & Humanities for Staten Island is also headquartered at Snug Harbor. Over the years, Snug Harbor has also hosted a variety of smaller organizations. Previously, these included a contract bridge club, a vocational studies program, and Alcoholics Anonymous chapters.

The Snug Harbor Cultural Center provides space for artists and arts organizations as well. Each year, Snug Harbor hosts the Snug Harbor Artist Residency Program, a two-month fellowship for artists; eight artists are selected each year, creating artworks that are exhibited at the end of the residency. The complex also hosts activities such as dance, yoga, and martial arts, and it is sometimes used for weddings. Walking tours of the complex are hosted as well.

== Transportation ==
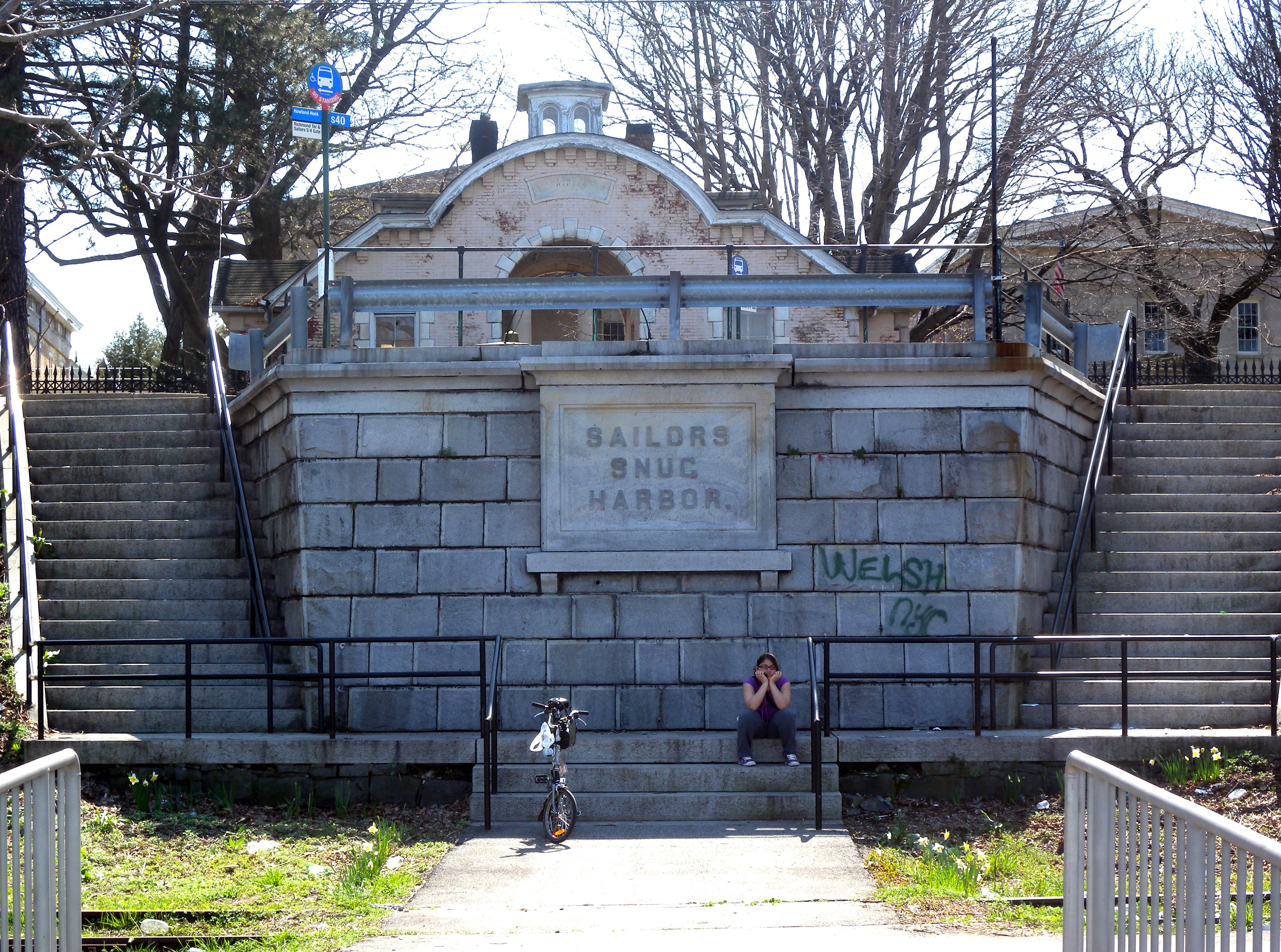
Remnants of the Staten Island Railway's former Sailors' Snug Harbor station

When Snug Harbor opened, it was served by a dock, where a boathouse was built in 1879. The Staten Island Railway and local streetcars began traveling to the Staten Island Ferry at St. George Terminal in 1886, providing additional means of access. The Sailors' Snug Harbor station was served by the Staten Island Railway's now-defunct North Shore Branch until 1953; a retaining wall and stairways from the station still exist. The S40 bus, which travels to and from St. George Terminal, stops at Snug Harbor's front gate. The cultural center initially operated a shuttle to St. George Terminal, which stopped running in the early 1990s.

== Impact ==
=== Reception and media ===
Because of the architectural styles used, Snug Harbor is sometimes described as having a Victorian feel. In 1895, one observer described the complex as having a "peculiar and lasting charm", describing Temple Row as having a "substantial and artistic" appearance. Another observer in 1946 said the residents' advanced ages contributed to the buildings' Victorian character. The Staten Island Advance wrote in 1960 that the complex "may appear to the passerby as about as aloof and apart as a ship at sea". The site has been described as Staten Island's "crown jewel" and "an incomparable remnant of New York's 19th-century seafaring past". The complex's 1976 National Historic Landmark designation report said the buildings had "no equal in scale, extent or quality in America". The architecture garnered notice from observers such as the writer Herman Melville and the sailor Joshua Slocum, who frequently discussed Snug Harbor. Numerous sources regarded buildings A–E as among the US's best Greek Revival buildings.

After the cultural center opened to the public, the architect David Gibson compared it to "an architectural catalog of stylistic development in the United States for 90 years". The Atlanta Constitution wrote in 1982 that the garden "lends softness to the soaring marble pillars of the buildings". In 1987, Paul Goldberger of the New York Times likened Snug Harbor to a campus, saying that buildings A–E "seem at once to embrace the 19th-century tradition of picturesque design and, by virtue of their rigid linear order, to reject it." The AIA Guide to New York City described Temple Row as "five Greek temples serenely surveying an immaculately groomed lawn", while another book called the row "the most ambitious moment of the classic revival in the United States".

Of the cultural center, a Times writer said in 2001 that the complex "offers an escape for every taste and age", a sentiment repeated in New York magazine. The Staten Island Advance called the complex's artistic and cultural offerings "unparalleled on Staten Island", enhanced by the architecture. The buildings were also the subject of Barnett Shepherd's 1979 book Sailors' Snug Harbor (1801–1976), and numerous residents have published books as well.

=== Landmark designations ===
Parts of the complex had been identified as candidates for historical preservation as early as the 1950s. The complex includes eight city landmarks designated by the New York City Landmarks Preservation Commission (LPC), specifically buildings A–E, the Veterans Memorial Hall, the Richmond Terrace gatehouse, and the fence. Buildings A–E and the Veterans Memorial Hall were individually listed as city landmarks in October 1965. The gate house and fence were listed as city landmarks in 1973; the fence's designation applies to 1/3 mile (0.54 km) on the northern edge of the property. The interiors of building C and the Veterans Memorial Hall were similarly designated in 1982.

The complex was added to the National Register of Historic Places in 1972, and the grounds were declared a National Historic Landmark district in 1976. Except for the eight existing city landmarks, most of the complex is not designated as part of a city landmark site or district, comprising another 22 buildings. The LPC proposed designating the complex as Staten Island's first city historic district in the 1980s, but the Snug Harbor Cultural Center opposed it. The more restrictive city historic district status would have mandated LPC approval for all modifications to the district, potentially increasing renovation costs. Amid the cultural center's continued opposition, the LPC deferred a decision on the historic-district designation until 2016, when the agency declined to designate the district.

== See also ==
- List of New York City Designated Landmarks in Staten Island
- National Historic Landmarks in New York City
- National Register of Historic Places listings in Staten Island
