= Snug Harbor Music Hall =

Building in Staten Island, New York

Coordinates: 40°38′37″N 74°06′05″W

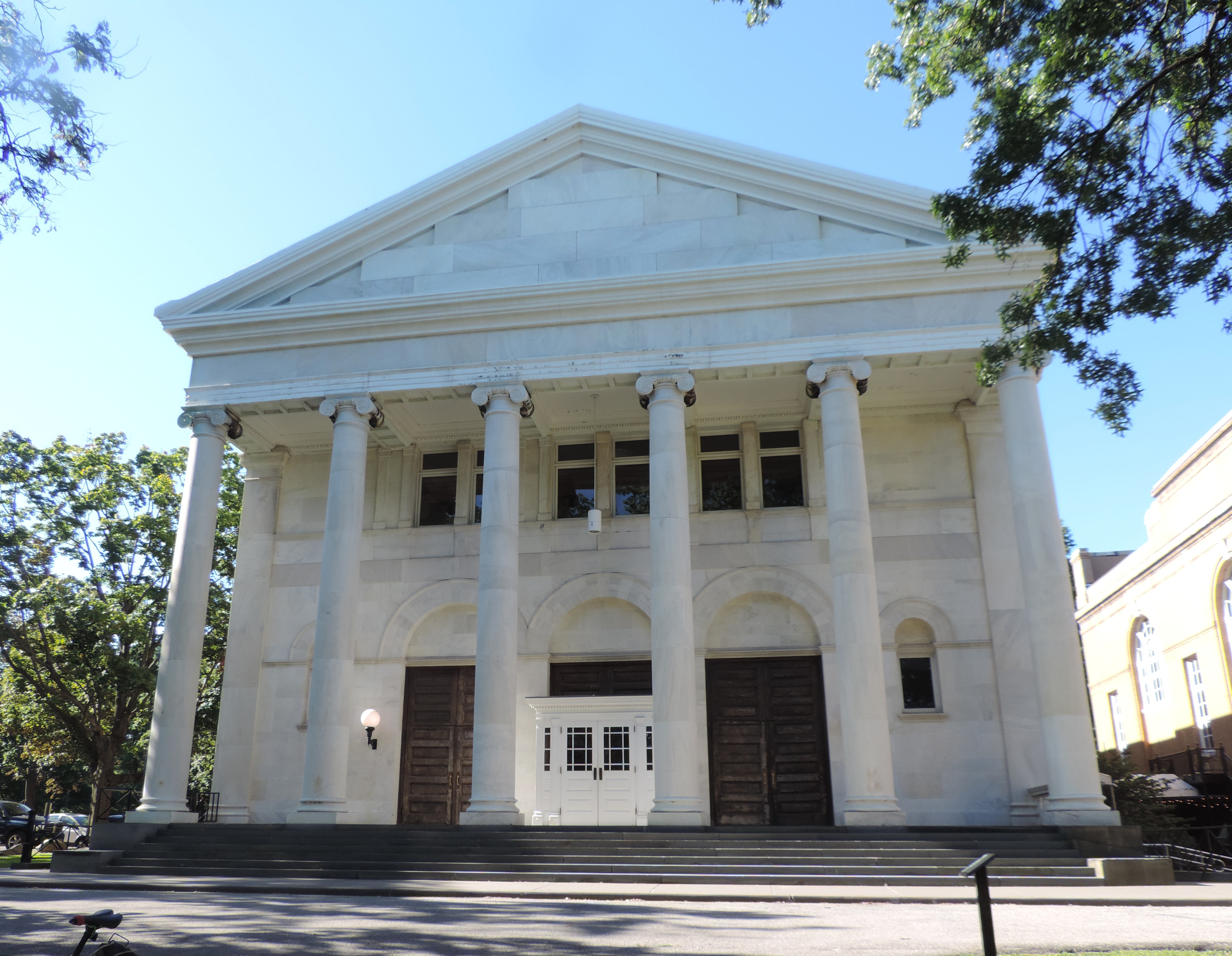
Music Hall

The Snug Harbor Music Hall (officially the Honorable Ralph J. Lamberti Music Hall) is a 686-seat Greek Revival auditorium on the grounds of Sailors' Snug Harbor in the New Brighton neighborhood of Staten Island, New York. It opened in July 1892, making it the second-oldest music hall in New York City, following Carnegie Hall. It was designed by the English immigrant architect Robert W. Gibson. Its inaugural performance was the cantata, "The Rose Maiden." In attendance were around 600 residents in plain wooden seats and 300 trustees with their guests in upholstered balcony seats. Entertainment in the decades that followed included the Georgia Minstrels and the Boston Ladies Schubert Quartet. It added film screenings in 1911 and sound projection in 1930. The building closed sometime in the 1970s when the campus faced a lack of funds and a decline in residents.

Its interior melds ancient Roman architecture with the Greek myth of Orpheus.

== Renovations ==
In 1987, Rafael Vinoly Architects won the Snug Harbor Cultural Center's design competition for the renovation of the Snug Harbor Music Hall. Vinoly's plans included carefully expanding the stage and other facilities without compromising its iconic original interior and exterior designs. The plans also included basic restoration of the hall's deteriorating interior. Peeling paint, large holes in the balcony floor, and chunks of fallen plaster were all set to be fixed for $12 million. The budget quickly became $20 million and the project was put on hold and eventually canceled. The building was left in a poor condition while it was closed, despite conservation efforts. In 1996 Vinoly's firm began overseeing a much more modest renovation project with a budget of $3 million. This plan included only the bare minimum, intending to get the building operable and welcoming guests again for the first time in over 20 years.

The Music Hall partially reopened in 1997. The renovated Music Hall initially lacked restrooms and other facilities, which were built as part of a $3.2 million second phase. This phase also included restoring some of the original design details. In addition, the Music Hall was renamed in 2003 for Ralph J. Lamberti, a former Staten Island borough president who had also led Snug Harbor's board of directors. The second phase was finished in 2004, after which the City Council appropriated funds for a third phase, which included dressing room renovations and installation of other finishes.

Designed by Studio Joseph Architects through DDC's Design Excellence Program, the City of New York committed nearly $20 million in 2019 to upgrade the Snug Harbor Music Hall, allowing it to accommodate larger-scale modern performances and events. The main scope of the project is its eastern annex. The annex includes a new loading dock, increased backstage space and facilities, two offices, a restroom, ADA compliant dressing rooms, and access between the music hall and the annex. Additionally, the entire building will get an upgrade to its fire alarm and suppression system to meet modern-day fire codes. The renovations brought the entire facility up to Actors Equity standards, allowing it to host Equity showcases and productions now for the first time in its history. The building was also made more ADA accessible than it had ever been before. The entire new annex, main floor, stage, and orchestra pit were all planned with ADA-compliant amenities. This renovation was again delayed, and in 2024 the city provided $2.1 million to finish the renovation.
