= Randall Manor, Staten Island =

Neighborhood in New York City

Coordinates: 40°38′28″N 74°06′12″W

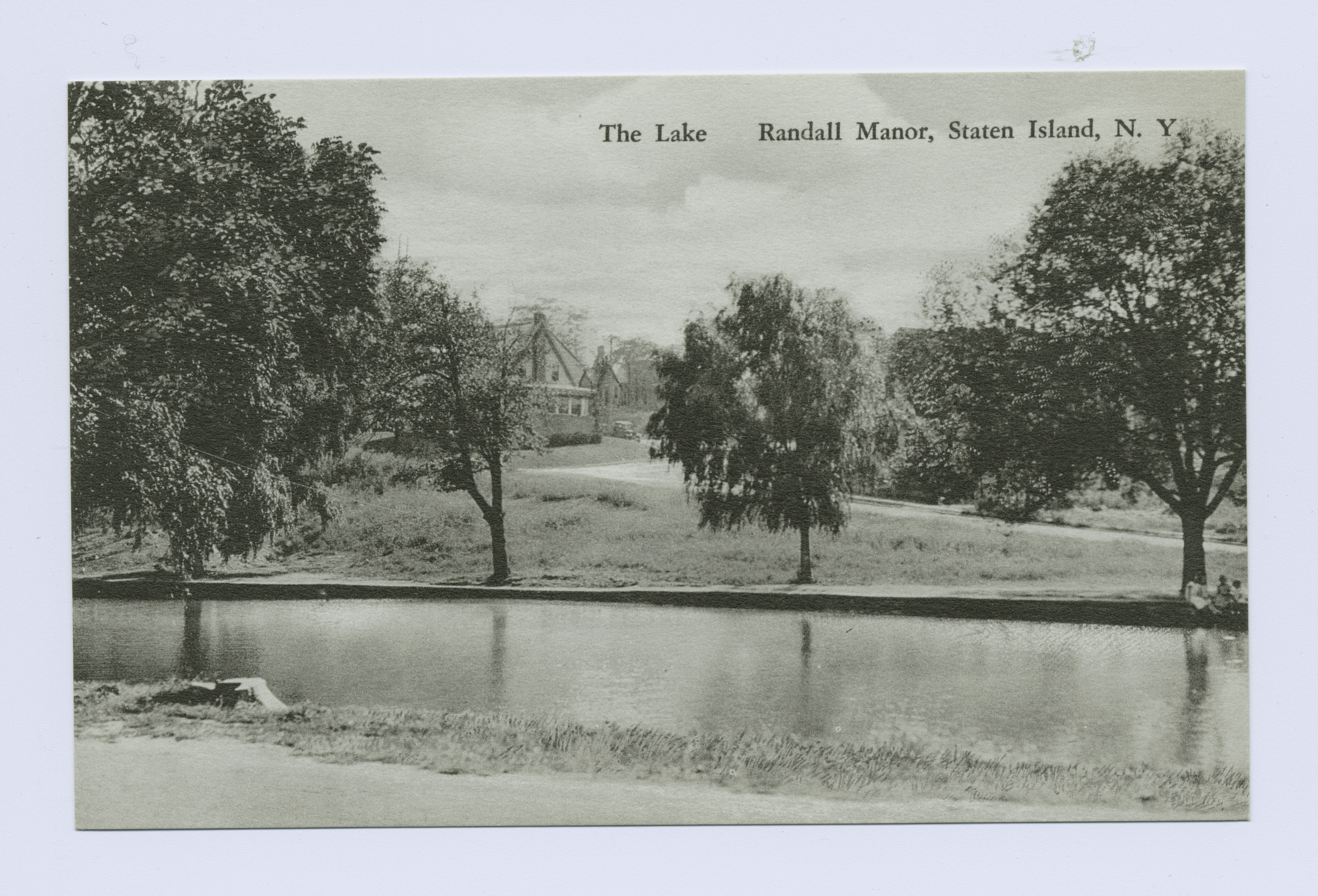
Postcard, early 20th century

Randall Manor is a neighborhood on the North Shore of Staten Island, one of the five boroughs of New York City, United States. The neighborhood is bound by Bard Avenue to the West, Henderson Avenue to the North, Forest Avenue to the South, and Lafayette Avenue to the East. It used to be part of Elliottville, Staten Island.

Named after Captain Robert Richard Randall, the founder of Sailors Snug Harbor, the neighborhood lies immediately to the south of the latter, between New Brighton and West Brighton.

== Features ==
Randall Manor is one of the few affluent enclaves on Staten Island not situated upon the backbone of hills that run diagonally across the island from northeast to southwest, which include Emerson Hill and Todt Hill. Development in the area had largely been completed by the time the Verrazzano–Narrows Bridge opened in 1964, so Randall Manor has been almost unaffected by the construction boom that accompanied the bridge's opening. Possessing the advantage of being located in proximity to the St. George ferry terminal, Randall Manor remains one of the most desirable and attractive locations on the island.

== Transportation ==
Randall Manor is served by the S48 and S98 local buses on Forest Avenue, the S46 and S96 along Castleton Avenue, and the S44 and S94 along Henderson Avenue. The SIM30 express bus also stops in the neighborhood.
