= Barnett Shepherd =

American local historian, architectural historian and preservationist (1938–2025)

Barnett Shepherd in 1997

Isaac Barnett Shepherd (July 26, 1938 – August 6, 2025) was an American local historian, architectural historian and preservationist. In 1977, he founded the Preservation League of Staten Island. He was the executive director and CEO of Historic Richmond Town.

== Early life and education ==
Shepherd was born on July 26, 1938, in St. Joseph, Missouri, to Clarence Shepherd Jr., a plant manager for the United States Gypsum Company who at one point was mayor of Diboll, Texas, and Marjorie Shepherd, née Lancaster, a milliner and artist. He was raised in Greenville, Mississippi, and attended schools in New Jersey and Oregon. He earned a bachelor's degree in English literature from Alma College in Michigan in 1960, a master of divinity degree from Union Theological Seminary in Manhattan in 1960, and a master's degree in art history from Indiana University in Bloomington in 1970.

== Career ==
=== Ministry ===
Shepherd was a Presbyterian minister for five years, having been attracted to the ministry by the church's efforts towards racial integration in the Southern U.S. and in the country as a whole. He opened an integrated church in Birmingham, Alabama, during the civil rights era, and worked as an associate minister in Columbus, Indiana.

=== Art history and architectural history ===
Finding that he had a greater interest in art and culture, Shepherd returned to graduate school and earned a master's in art history. He taught that subject at the University of Florida. In order to be in a hub of art activity in New York City, he moved in 1972 to Staten Island, where for a time he painted full-time. He became interested in Staten Island's history, and architectural history in particular, and began to publish works on the latter topic. He obtained employment at the Staten Island Museum with a specialization in architectural history. There he created an exhibition on Staten Island architecture and led walking tours.

=== Historic preservation ===
Realizing the need for a historic preservation organization on Staten Island, and finding that there was none, Shepherd together with others founded the Preservation League of Staten Island in 1977. He was its president until 1981, and its executive director from 2012 to 2017. He was instrumental in preserving and promoting the Snug Harbor Cultural Center & Botanical Garden and the St. Paul’s Avenue-Stapleton Heights Historic District. He was executive director and chief executive of Historic Richmond Town from 1981 to 2000. There he oversaw the preservation of multiple properties.

== Works ==
- Shepherd, Barnett (May 1976). "Sailors' Snug Harbor Reattributed to Minard Lafever". Journal of the Society of Architectural Historians. 35 (2): 108–123 – via JSTOR.
- Gibson, David; Shepherd, Barnett; Bauer, Steven (1979). Sailors' Snug Harbor: an Historic Structures Report. New York: Snug Harbor Cultural Center. LCCN 79127544.
- Shepherd, Barnett (1979). Sailors' Snug Harbor, 1801-1976. New York: Snug Harbor Cultural Center. LCCN 79016979.
- Shepherd, Barnett (1979). A Staten Island Ferry Rider's Guide to the Sights of Upper New York Bay (Map). Staten Island, New York?: Barnett Shepherd?.
- Shepherd, Barnett (1980). Inventory of Architectural Drawings in the Collection of the Staten Island Historical Society. Staten Island, New York: Staten Island Historical Society.
- Shepherd, Barnett (1999). "Randall, Robert Richard". American National Biography Online. Oxford: Oxford University Press.
- Mosley, Lois A. H.; Shepherd, Barnett (2003). Sandy Ground Memories. Staten Island, New York: Staten Island Historical Society. ISBN 9780960675654.
- Salmon, Patricia M.; Shepherd, Barnett (2008). The Staten Island Ferry: A History. Staten Island, New York: Staten Island Museum. ISBN 9780971226722.
- Shepherd, Barnett (2008). Tottenville: the Town the Oyster Built: a Staten Island Community, its People, Industry and Architecture (1st ed.). Staten Island, New York: Preservation League of Staten Island. ISBN 9780615264349. LCCN 2008910997.
- Shepherd, Barnett (March 30, 2012). "The Reminiscences of Barnett Shepherd" (PDF). New York Preservation Archive Project (Interview). Interviewed by Juselius, Elin.
- Shepherd, Barnett (2013). Staten Island Scenery: Paintings, Prints, Drawings and Photographs, 1679-1900. Staten Island, New York: The Staten Island Historical Society. ISBN 9780960675623. LCCN 2013952669.

== Personal life ==
Shepherd was openly gay. He married his longtime partner, Nick Dowen, in October 2024. They lived in the Judge Jacob Tysen House, built in 1834, on Staten Island.

== Death ==
Shepherd died on August 16, 2025, on Staten Island, at age 87.
