= New York Chinese Scholar's Garden =

Garden in Staten Island, New York

Coordinates: 40°38′31″N 74°6′16″W

The New York Chinese Scholar's Garden (simplified Chinese: 寄兴园; traditional Chinese: 寄興園; pinyin: Jìxīng Yuán; Jyutping: Gei3hing1 Jyun4) is part of the Staten Island Botanical Garden, located in the Snug Harbor Cultural Center. Materials were shipped to Staten Island in the spring of 1998, when a team of 40 Chinese artists and artisans from Suzhou constructed the garden. It opened in June 1999.

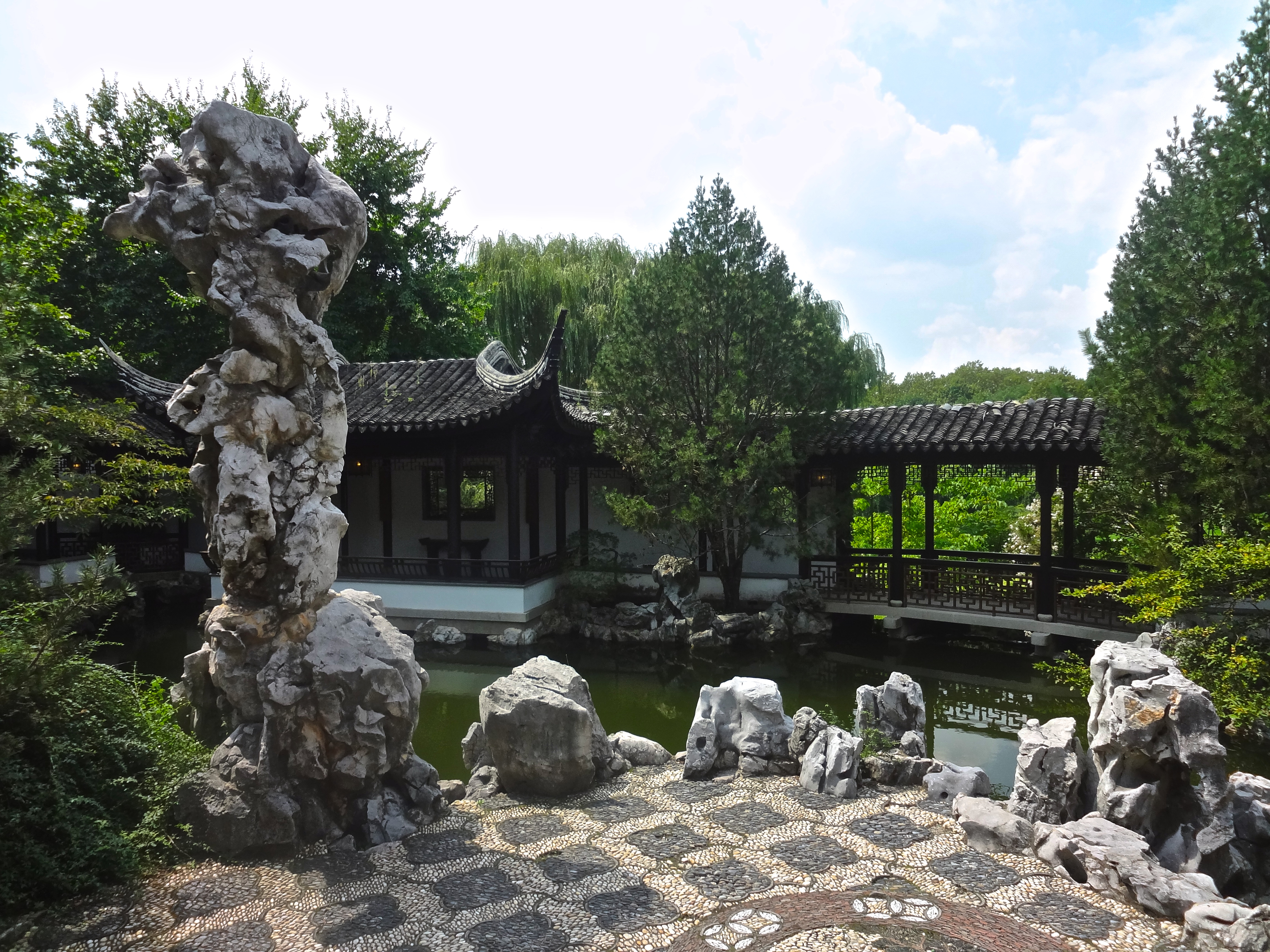
A view overlooking the koi pond within the New York Chinese Scholar's Garden in Staten Island.

President of the Botanical Garden Frances Paulo Huber recognized the need for an authentic Chinese garden in 1984. The garden was finally constructed with the support of many partners, including the Staten Island Botanical Garden, the City of New York, the Landscape Architecture Company of China, the Metropolitan Chinese American Community, various private foundations, and hundreds of individuals and corporate donors. After a long series of collaborations a contract was signed with the Landscape Architecture Corporation of China. Mr. Zou Gongwu was appointed as chief project designer.

== Design ==
The garden is designed with elegance (ya, 雅) in mind. The garden is traditionally entered through a narrow passage where meditation takes place, prior to entering the main garden. The design of the garden produces harmony through its views and concepts. The garden creates an infinite space within an enclosed area.

- The borrowed view extends space beyond the border of the garden.
- The hidden view creates suspense and excitement as one moves deeper into the garden.
- The opposite view is framed by a moon gate or floral window.

== Elements ==
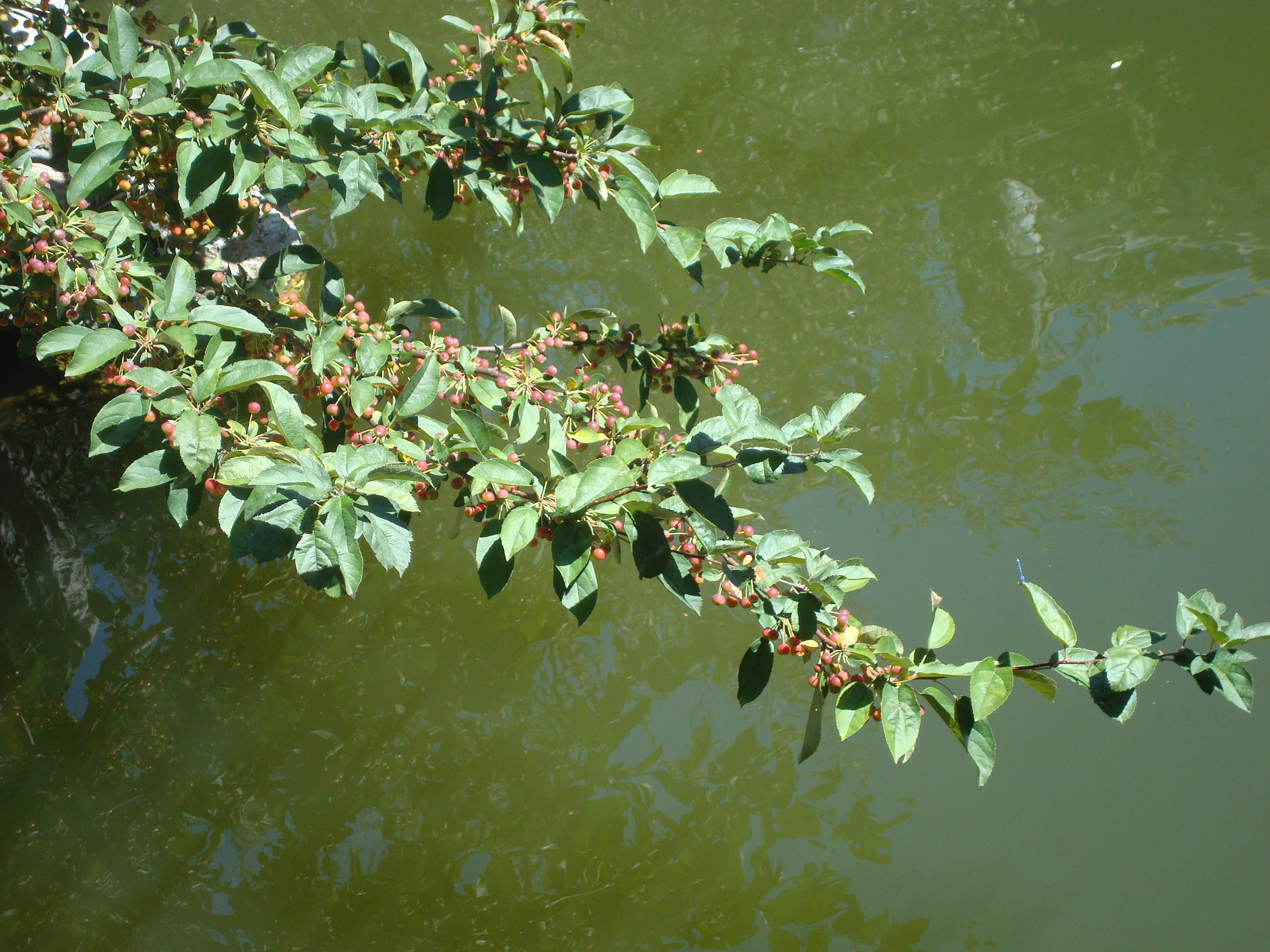
The New York Chinese Scholar's Garden

- Wood - Nails or glue are not used in a Chinese garden. Wooden elements are joined together using traditional Chinese construction techniques (a sophisticated mortise-and-tenon system characteristic of traditional Chinese Ming Dynasty construction).
- Rocks - In Chinese literature, rocks are described as the "bones of the earth."
- Water - The garden contains three ponds and one waterfall. Water is thought of as the arteries of the world.
- Plantings - China has contributed the rose, lilac, daphne, species of rhododendron, and the peony to the rest of the world. Trees, shrubs, and flowers are selected for shape, seasonal character, and symbolic meaning.
- Furniture - The furniture of the garden is called the "internal organs."
- Walls - Walls are strategically placed in the garden for design purposes.
- Walkways - The curvature of the walkways offer many views and angles.
- Bridges - Bridges and paths frequently zigzag, providing visitors with ever-changing vantages to experience the garden. Chinese philosophers also believed that zigzagging paths would throw off evil spirits.
- Pavilions - There are two pavilion in the garden. One is for the scholar's study and the other provides visual access to various other scenes.
- Xie - A Xie is a building one half hovering over a lake. The designs makes it seem that the building is floating in the water.
- Painting and Calligraphy - Paintings and calligraphy represent the garden owner's knowledge of literature and art.
