= Robert W. Gibson =

American architect

Robert Williams Gibson
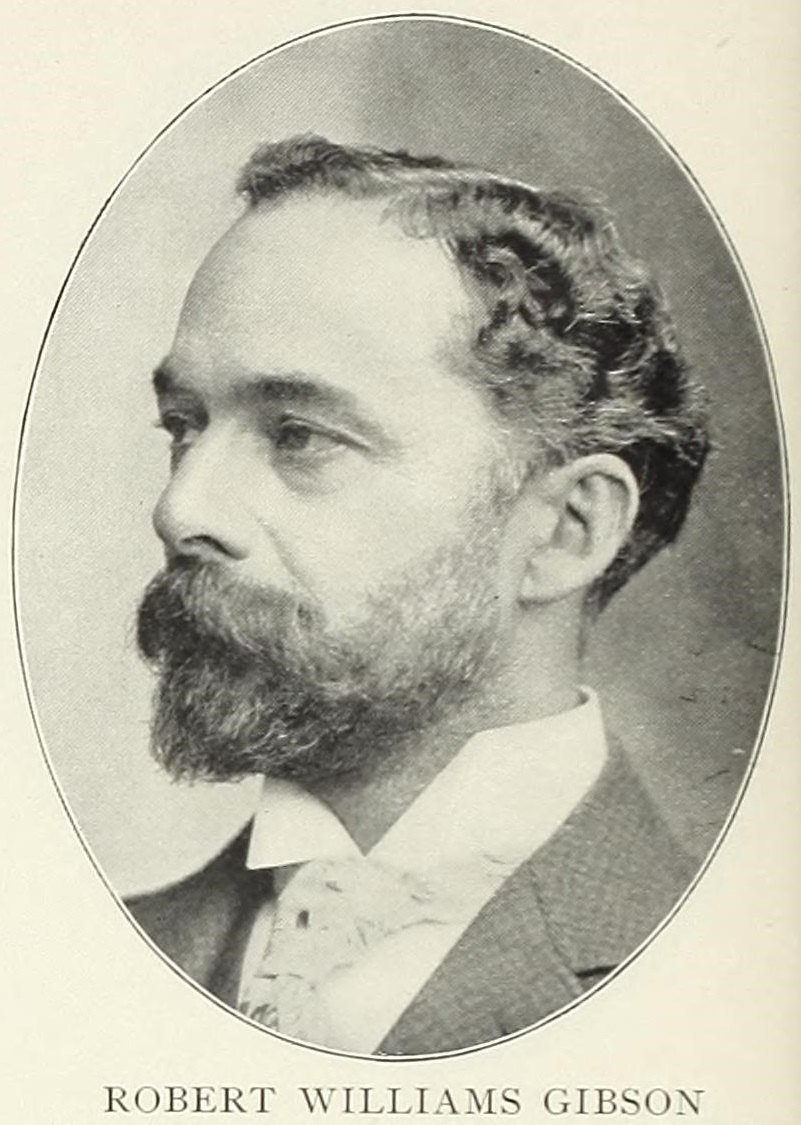
- Robert W. Gibson, circa 1899
- Born: November 17, 1854; Aveley, Essex, England
- Died: March 17, 1927 (aged 72); Woodbury, New York
- Occupation: Architect
- Practice: Gibson & Pretyman; Robert W. Gibson
- Buildings: Cathedral of All Saints, Albany, New York; Church Missions House, New York City; Branford House, Groton, Connecticut; Soo Line Building, Minneapolis, Minnesota

Robert W. Gibson, AIA, (1854 in England – 1927 in New York City) was an English-born American ecclesiastical architect active in late-nineteenth- and early-twentieth-century New York state. He designed several large Manhattan churches and a number of prominent residences and institutional buildings.

== Life and career ==
Robert Williams Gibson was born November 17, 1854, in Aveley, Essex, England, to Samuel Lodwick Gibson and Eliza (Williams) Gibson. In 1875 he entered the architectural school of the Royal Academy of Arts in London, graduating in 1879. Having been awarded a traveling scholarship, he spent the next two years traveling in Europe. He immigrated to the United States in 1881, initially settling in Albany, New York. For his first four years in the United States he worked in partnership with William Pretyman, a decorator and designer, as Gibson & Pretyman. This partnership was dissolved in 1884, after which he worked independently for the rest of his career.

The dissolution of Gibson's partnership coincided with the start of construction of the new Episcopal Cathedral of All Saints in Albany, having won a competition the previous year. A project of Bishop William Croswell Doane, the building was the first American Episcopal cathedral to be conceived on the scale of its European counterparts. The cathedral was to be built in phases, the first of which was completed in 1888. At that time the whole of the building was built only to a height of forty feet, with a temporary roof. All unnecessary exterior ornament was omitted. Gibson supervised a second phase beginning in 1902, and the choir and sanctuary were completed to their full height in 1904. A chapter house was also constructed at this time. Although further work was planned, the construction of the neighboring New York State Education Building and Doane's death prevented any additional construction work, and the cathedral is permanently incomplete.

In 1888, having completed the first phase of the cathedral and having been commissioned to design a bank for the United States Trust Company in New York, Gibson relocated to that city. From these two projects Gibson developed specialties in both of these building types, and they were a mainstay of his practice for almost thirty years. Gibson practiced architecture in New York until at least 1915, apparently retiring afterward.

After winning the Albany competition, Gibson entered, but did not win, at least three more design competitions for major churches. His entry into the 1889 competition to design the Cathedral of St. John the Divine in New York drew from a variety of sources, with an overall effect of the Decorated period of English Gothic architecture. In 1902 he entered the preliminary competition to design the Liverpool Cathedral, but nothing is known of his proposal. Lastly, in 1906 he entered the competition to design the new St. Thomas Episcopal Church in New York. Unlike his competitors, who proposed linear plans with entrances on Fifth Avenue, Gibson designed a building with a semicircular plan facing 53rd Street. His facade was based on the West Front of Peterborough Cathedral, with possible influences from Ely as well. Other competitions entered included the New York Stock Exchange Building and Alexander Hamilton U.S. Custom House, which was won by Cass Gilbert. Several competitors, including Gibson, alleged that Gilbert had conspired with Supervising Architect of the Treasury James Knox Taylor, his former business partner, to be awarded the commission.

Gibson joined the American Institute of Architects in 1885 as a fellow. He was a member of the AIA Board of Directors, and served two terms as president of the Architectural League of New York.

== Personal life ==
Gibson became a naturalized citizen of the United States in 1887. After moving to New York, he married Caroline Hammond in 1890. They had four children: Robert Hammond Gibson, Lydia Gibson, Katherine (Gibson) Van Cortlandt and Hester (Gibson) Huntington. His son, R. Hammond Gibson, was a naval historian. Lydia, his eldest daughter, was an artist who would become a noted Socialist activist and was married to Communist leader Robert Minor. Hester, the youngest, was less public with her politics but was involved in the work of the International Labor Defense and made the news in 1939 when she bailed out jailed Communist leader Earl Browder.

Gibson was a member of the Century Association and the Seawanhaka Corinthian Yacht Club.

In 1923, in retirement, Gibson published The Morality of Nature, a philosophical work. He died August 17, 1927, at his home in Woodbury, New York.

== Legacy ==
At least eleven of Gibson's works have been listed on the United States National Register of Historic Places, with others contributing to listed historic districts. Six more are designated New York City Landmarks.

== Architectural works ==
- Lodge, (Note: Albany Rural Cemetery was listed on the National Register of Historic Places in 1979.) Albany Rural Cemetery, Albany, New York (1882)
- Mausoleum of John Augustus Griswold, (Note: Oakwood Cemetery was listed on the National Register of Historic Places in 1984.) Oakwood Cemetery, Troy, New York (1883)
- Chapel, Albany Rural Cemetery, Albany, New York (1884)
- Episcopal Cathedral of All Saints, (Note: A contributing property to the Lafayette Park Historic District, listed on the National Register of Historic Places in 1978.) Albany, New York (1884–88 and 1902–04)
- House for George Evans, Albany, New York (1884, demolished)
- House for James E. Craig, (Note: A contributing property to the Washington Park Historic District, listed on the National Register of Historic Places in 1972.) Albany, New York (1885)
- Parish house of the Episcopal Church of the Ascension (former), Brooklyn, New York (1885, altered 1985 and 2018)
- House for William E. Spier, Glens Falls, New York (1886, demolished)
- Trinity Episcopal Church (former), Gloversville, New York (1886)
- National Commercial Bank Building, (Note: A contributing property to the Downtown Albany Historic District, listed on the National Register of Historic Places in 1980.) Albany, New York (1887)
- "Notleymere" for Frank L. Norton, Cazenovia, New York (1887–88, NRHP 1991)
- Troy Club, Troy, New York (1887–88, demolished 1981)
- Christ Episcopal Church, Herkimer, New York (1888)
- Parish house of Christ Episcopal Church, Rochester, New York (1888, demolished 1923)
- Rebuilding of the Episcopal Cathedral of St. Paul, Buffalo, New York (1888–89, NRHP 1973, NHL 1987)
- St. Stephen Episcopal Church, Olean, New York (1888–90, NRHP 2001)
- United States Trust Company Building, New York, New York (1888, demolished)
- 88 White Street, New York, New York (1889)
- Monument of Amasa J. Parker, Albany Rural Cemetery, Albany, New York (1889)
- Child's Hospital, Albany, New York (1890, demolished 1960)
- Greenwich Savings Bank Building, New York, New York (1890, demolished)
- Randall Memorial Church, Sailors' Snug Harbor, Staten Island, New York (1890–92, demolished)
- Snug Harbor Music Hall, (Note: A contributing property to the Sailors' Snug Harbor historic district, listed on the National Register of Historic Places in 1972.) Sailors' Snug Harbor, Staten Island, New York (1890–92)
- St. Michael Episcopal Church, New York, New York (1890-91, NRHP 1996, NYCL 2016)
- Grace Episcopal Church, Plainfield, New Jersey (1891–92, NRHP 2002)
- Seawanhaka Corinthian Yacht Club, Oyster Bay, New York (1891–92, NRHP 1974)
- Rhode Island Hospital Trust Company Building (former), Providence, Rhode Island (1891, demolished)
- Trinity Episcopal Church, (Note: A contributing property to the Downtown Ossining Historic District, listed on the National Register of Historic Places in 1989.) Ossining, New York (1891)
- West End Collegiate Church, New York, New York (1891–92, NRHP 1980, NYCL 1967)
- Christ Episcopal Church, Rochester, New York (1892–94, NRHP 2008)
- Church Missions House, (Note: Designed in association with Edward J. Neville Stent.) New York, New York (1892–94, NRHP 1982, NYCL 1979)
- St. John Episcopal Church, Northampton, Massachusetts (1892–93)
- Christ Episcopal Church, (Note: A contributing property to the Southside Historic District, listed on the National Register of Historic Places in 1998.) Corning, New York (1893–95)
- New York Eye and Ear Infirmary, New York, New York (1893 et seq.)
- Norwich Savings Society Building, (Note: A contributing property to the Downtown Norwich Historic District, listed on the National Register of Historic Places in 1985.) Norwich, Connecticut (1893–95)
- Coffee Exchange Building, New York, New York (1894, demolished)
- New York Clearing House Association Building, New York, New York (1894–96, demolished)
- Bank of Buffalo Building, Buffalo, New York (1895, demolished)
- Onondaga County Savings Bank Building, (Note: A contributing property to the Hanover Square Historic District, listed on the National Register of Historic Places in 1978.) Syracuse, New York (1896–97)
- LuEsther T. Mertz Library, New York Botanical Garden, Bronx, New York (1897–1901, NYCL 2007)
- St. Luke Episcopal Church (former), Mechanicville, New York (1897–98)
- Savings Bank of Utica Building, (Note: A contributing property to the Downtown Genesee Street Historic District, listed on the National Register of Historic Places in 2018.) Utica, New York (1898)
- Episcopal Church of the Good Shepherd, (Note: Construction was supervised by architect Charles E. Hartge of Raleigh. A contributing property to the Capitol Area Historic District, listed on the National Register of Historic Places in 1978.) Raleigh, North Carolina (1899–1914)
- Hearst Hall, National Cathedral School, Washington, D.C. (1899–1900)
- Glastonbury Cathedra of the Washington National Cathedral, (Note: The cathedra was designed by Gibson from stones from Glastonbury Abbey gifted to the Episcopal Diocese of Washington by Stanley Austin, then-owner of the Abbey ruins. It was originally placed in the Little Sanctuary, now part of St. Albans School, before being moved into the cathedral proper.) Washington, D.C. (1901)
- Merchants' and Mechanics' Bank Building, Scranton, Pennsylvania (1901, demolished)
- Martha Washington Hotel, New York, New York (1901–03, NYCL 2012)
- "Branford House" for Morton F. Plant, Groton, Connecticut (1902–04, NRHP 1984)
- Parish house of St. Michael Episcopal Church, New York, New York (1902)
- Utica City National Bank Building, (Note: A contributing property to the Lower Genesee Street Historic District, listed on the National Register of Historic Places in 1982.) Utica, New York (1902–04)
- House for Morton F. Plant, New York, New York (1903–05, NRHP 1983, NYCL 1980)
- Newark Charitable Eye and Ear Infirmary, Newark, New Jersey (1903, demolished)
- First National Bank Building, (Note: Construction was supervised by architect Edward Kennedy of Minneapolis.) Minneapolis, Minnesota (1905–06, demolished 1914)
- Colonial Club, (Note: Designed in association with Francis G. Stewart. A contributing property to the Princeton Historic District, listed on the National Register of Historic Places in 1975.) Princeton, New Jersey (1905–06)
- Griswold Hotel, Groton, Connecticut (1905–06, demolished 1969)
- Albert Lindley Lee Memorial Hospital, Fulton, New York (1909, demolished)
- Rectory of St. Michael Episcopal Church, New York, New York (1912)
- "Yeadon" for George Bullock, Oyster Bay, New York (1913, demolished 1996)
- First National Bank-Soo Line Building, (Note: Construction was supervised by architects Hewitt & Brown of Minneapolis.) Minneapolis, Minnesota (1914–15)

== Gallery of architectural works ==
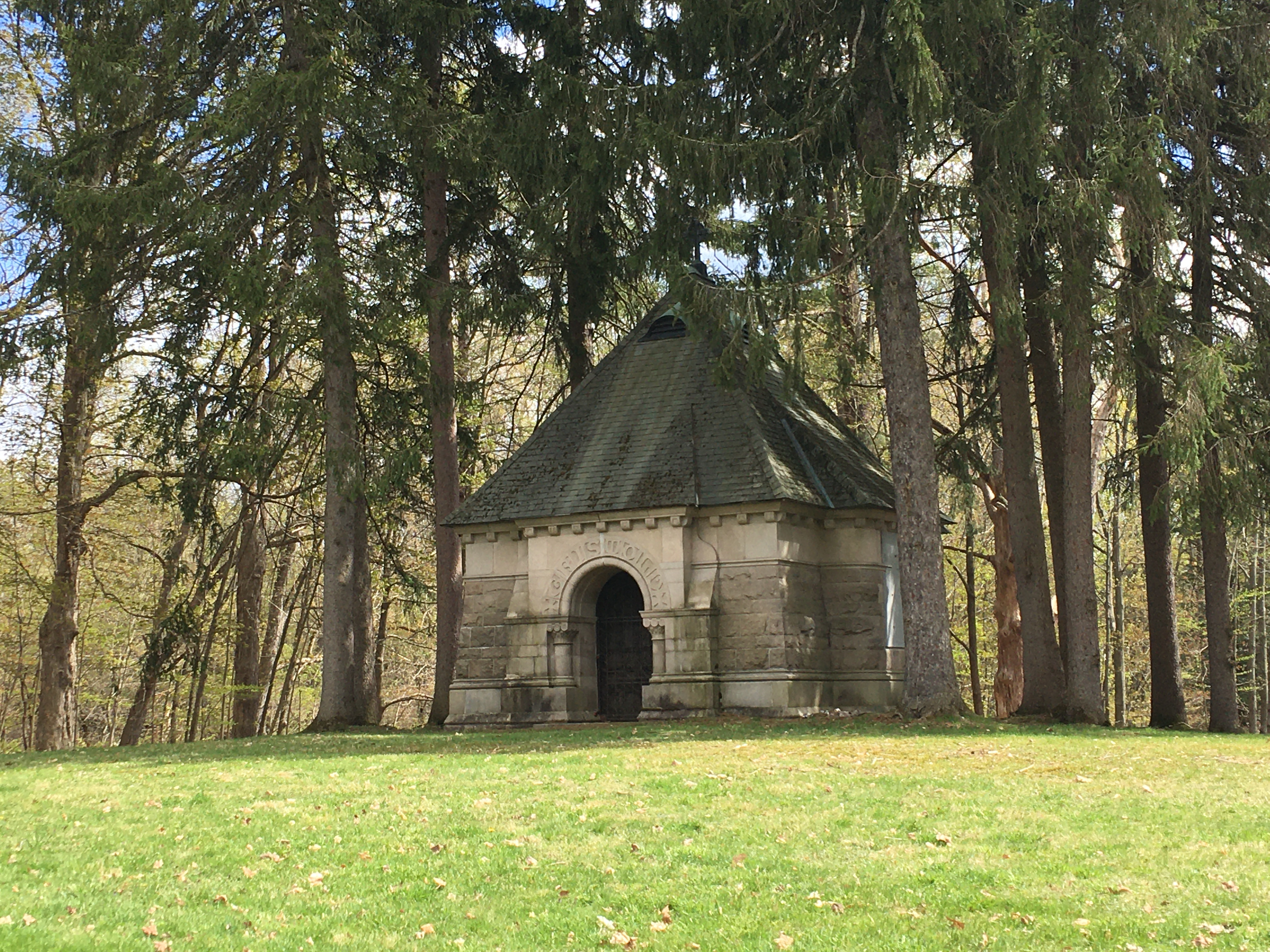
Mausoleum of John Augustus Griswold, Oakwood Cemetery, Troy, New York, 1883.

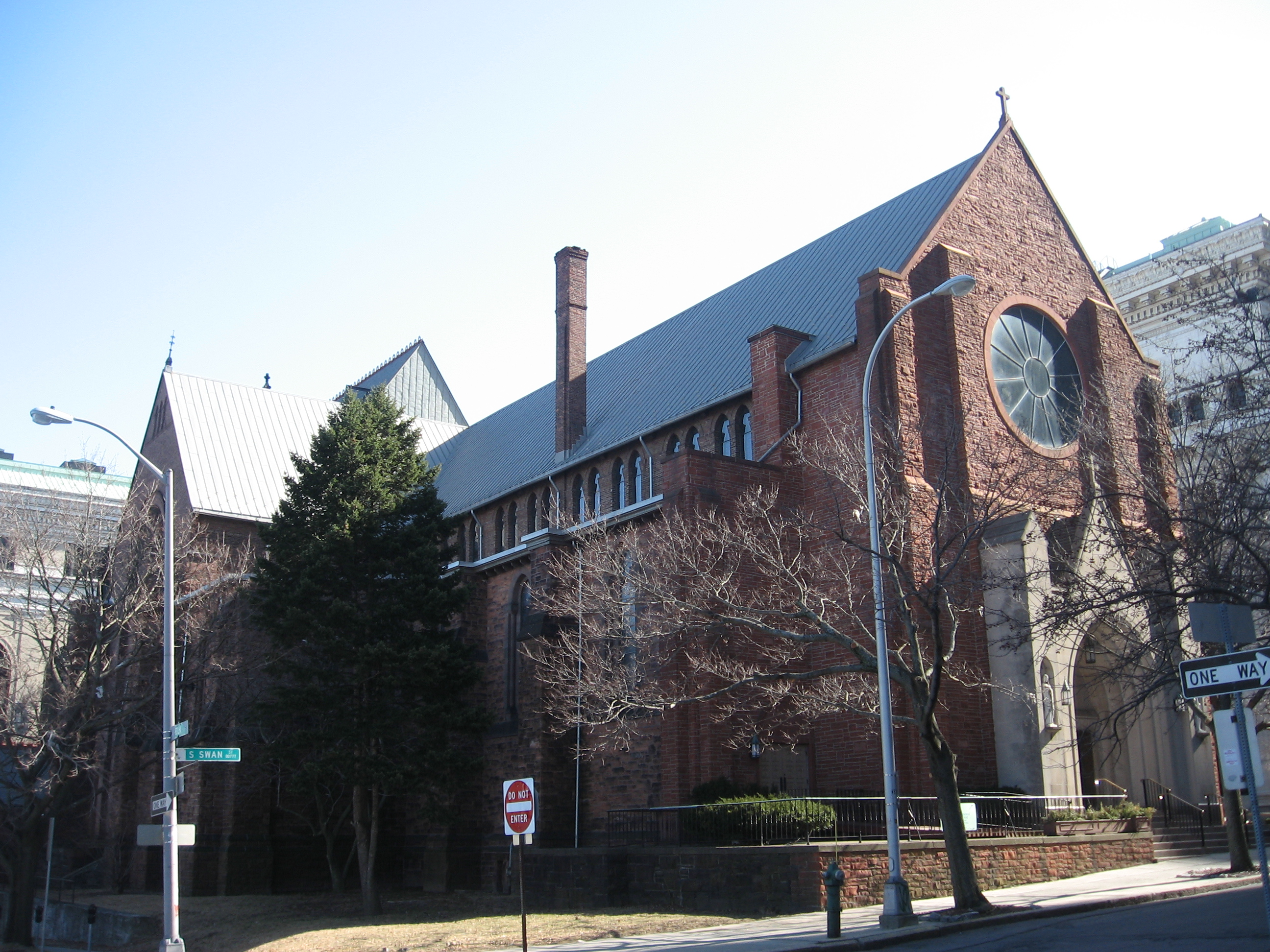
Episcopal Cathedral of All Saints, Albany, New York, 1884–88 and 1902–04.

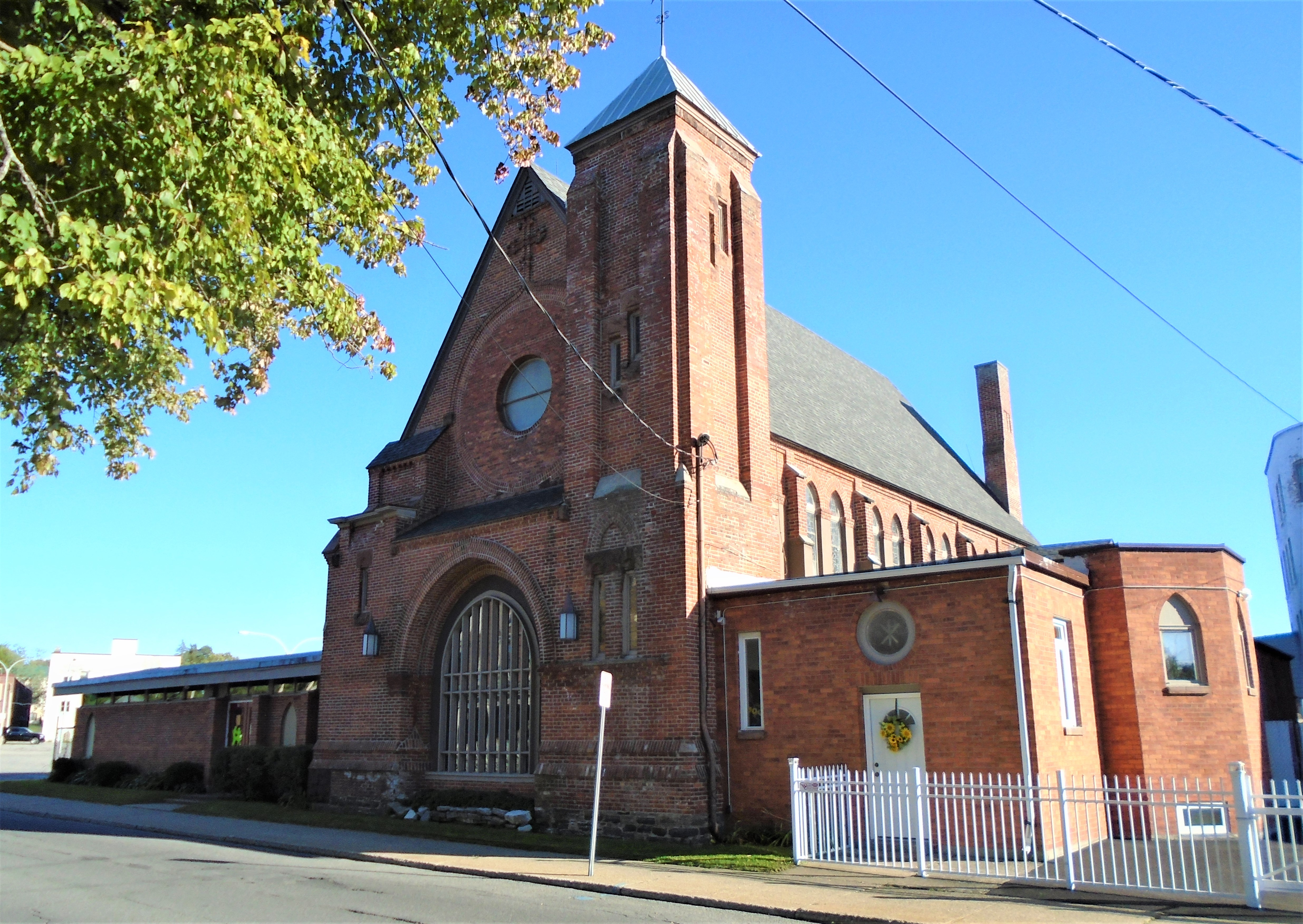
Trinity Episcopal Church, Gloversville, New York, 1886.

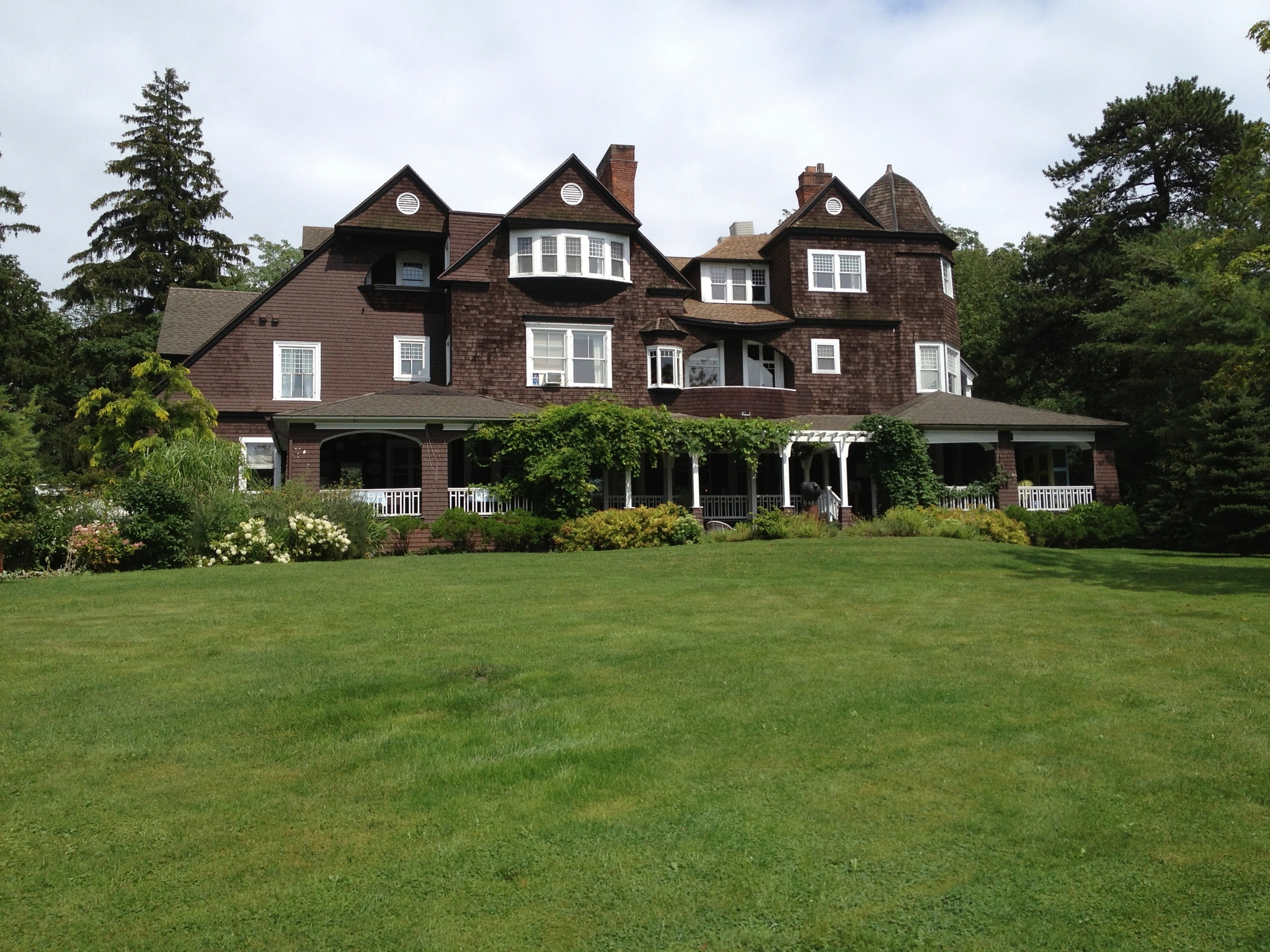
Notleymere, Cazenovia, New York, 1887-88.

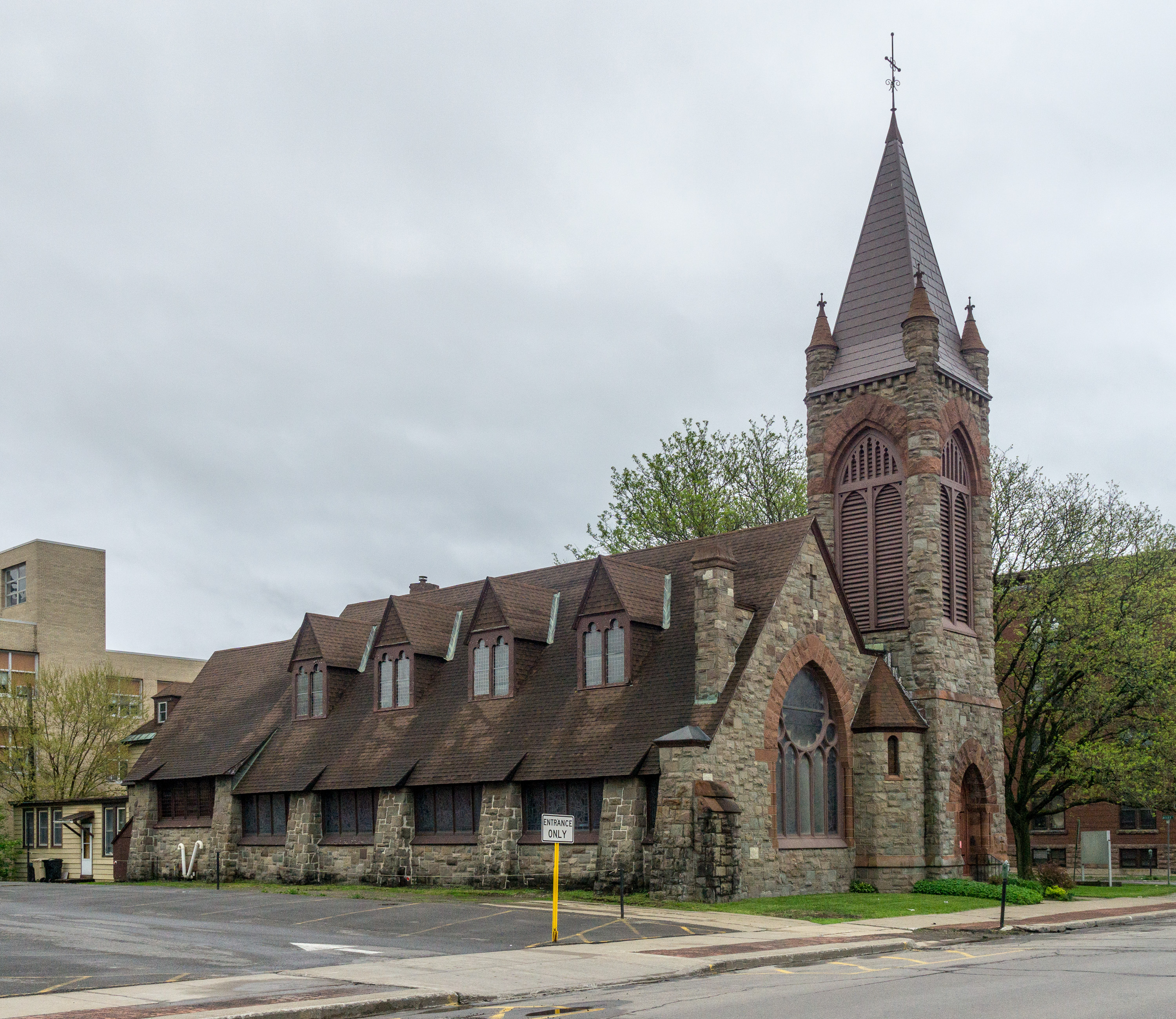
Christ Episcopal Church, Herkimer, New York, 1888.

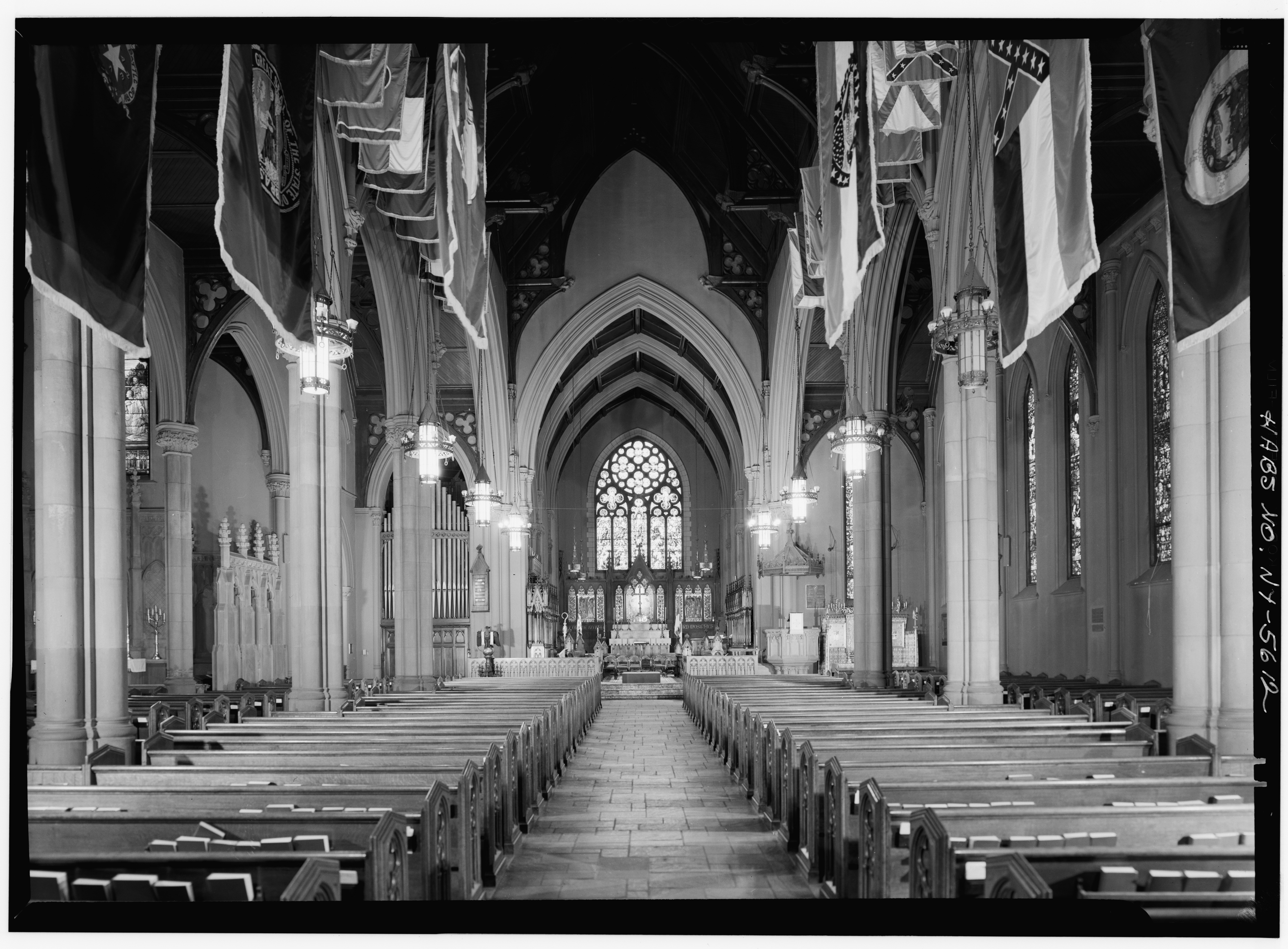
Interior of the Episcopal Cathedral of St. Paul, Buffalo, New York, 1888–89.

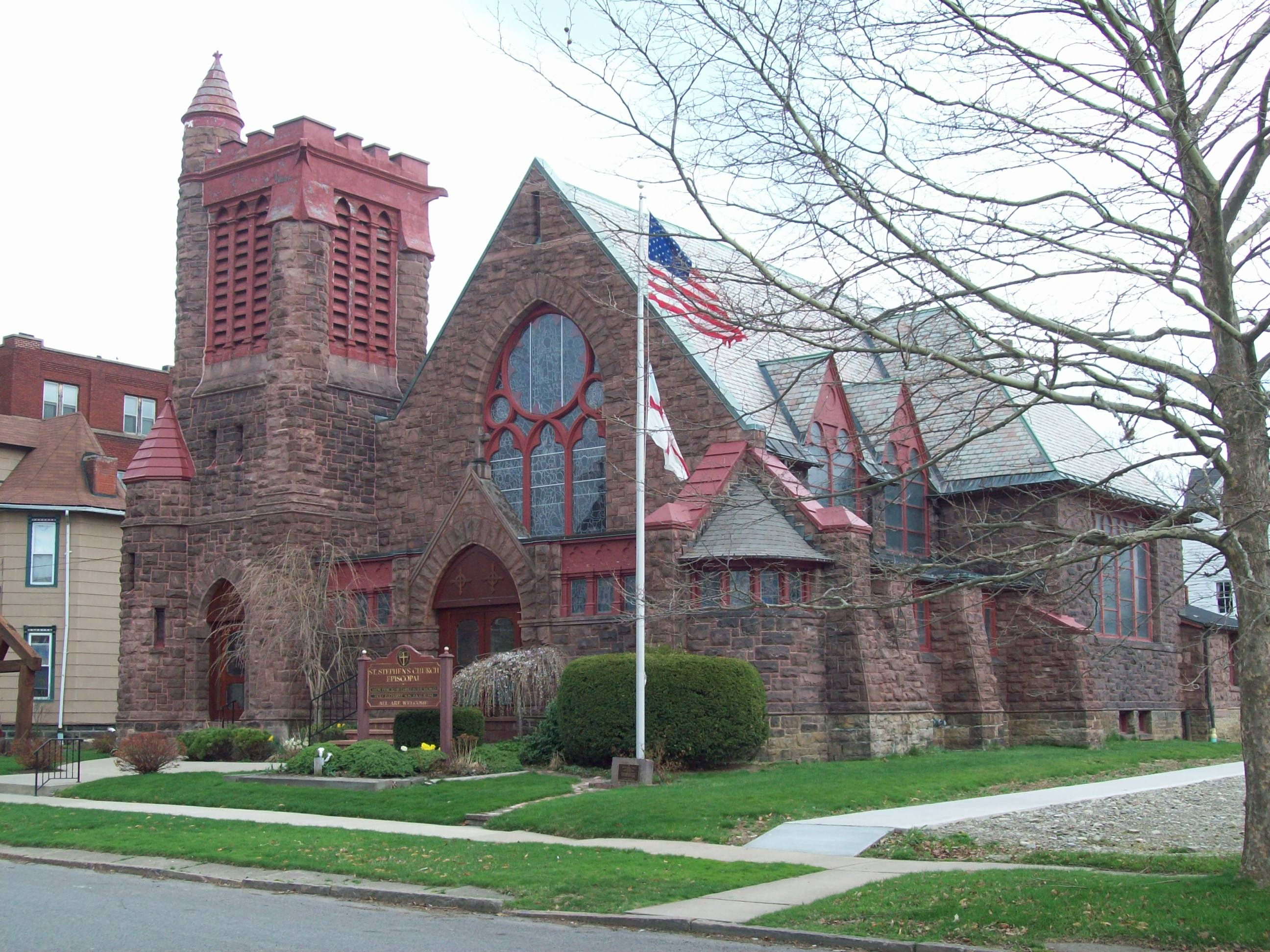
St. Stephen Episcopal Church, Olean, New York, 1888–90.

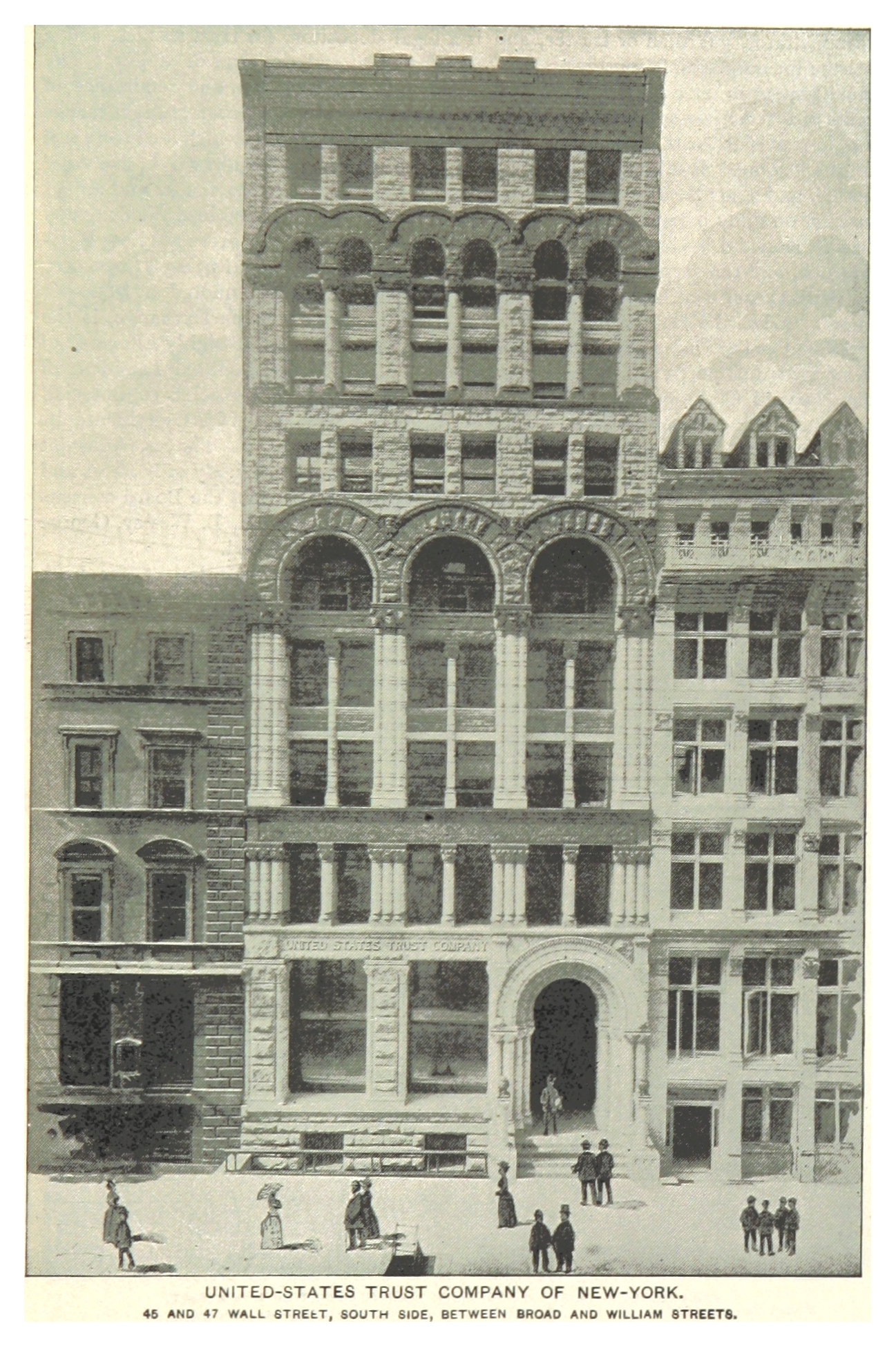
United States Trust Company Building, New York, New York, 1888.

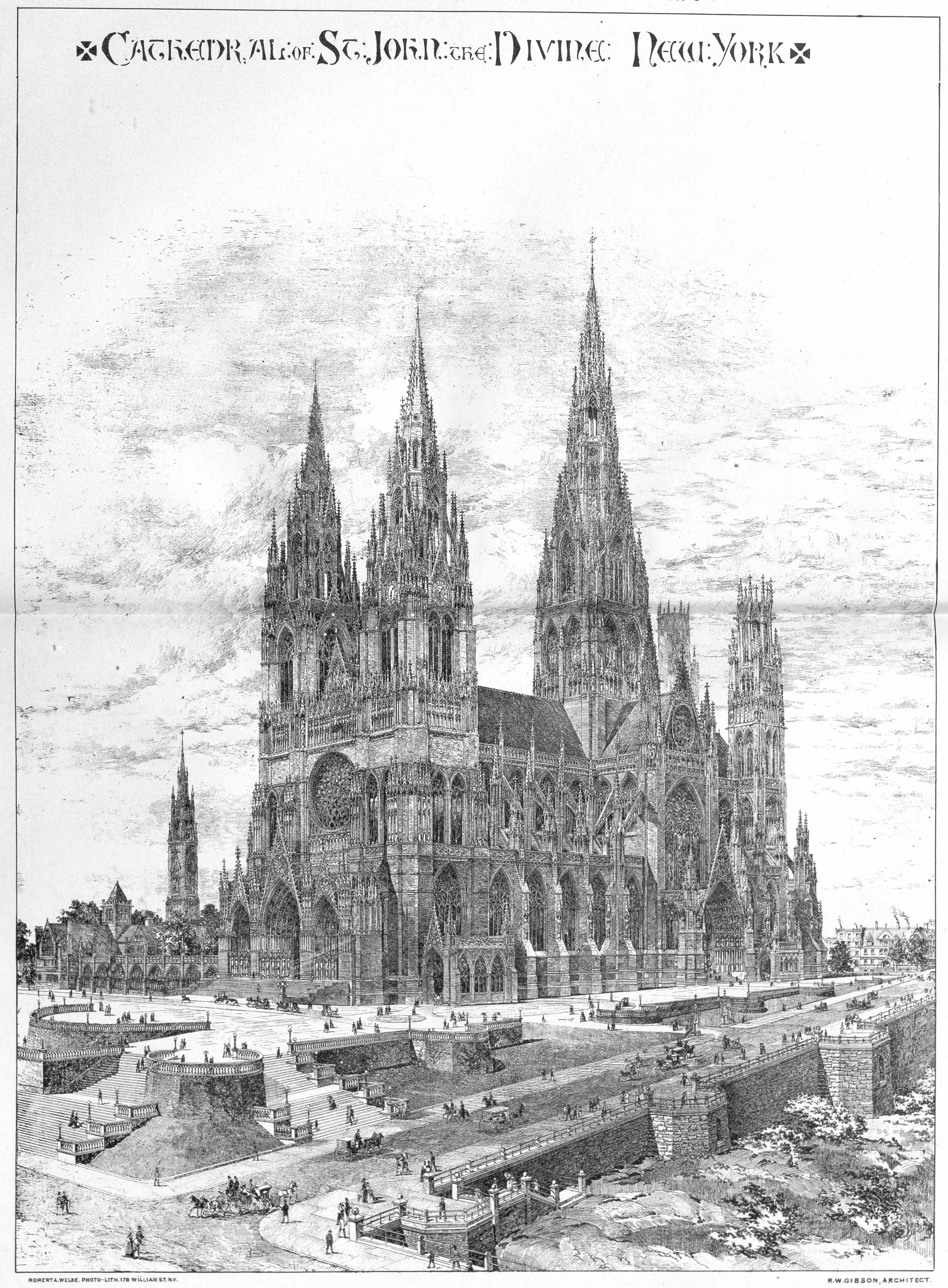
Rejected design for the Cathedral of St. John the Divine, New York, New York, 1889.

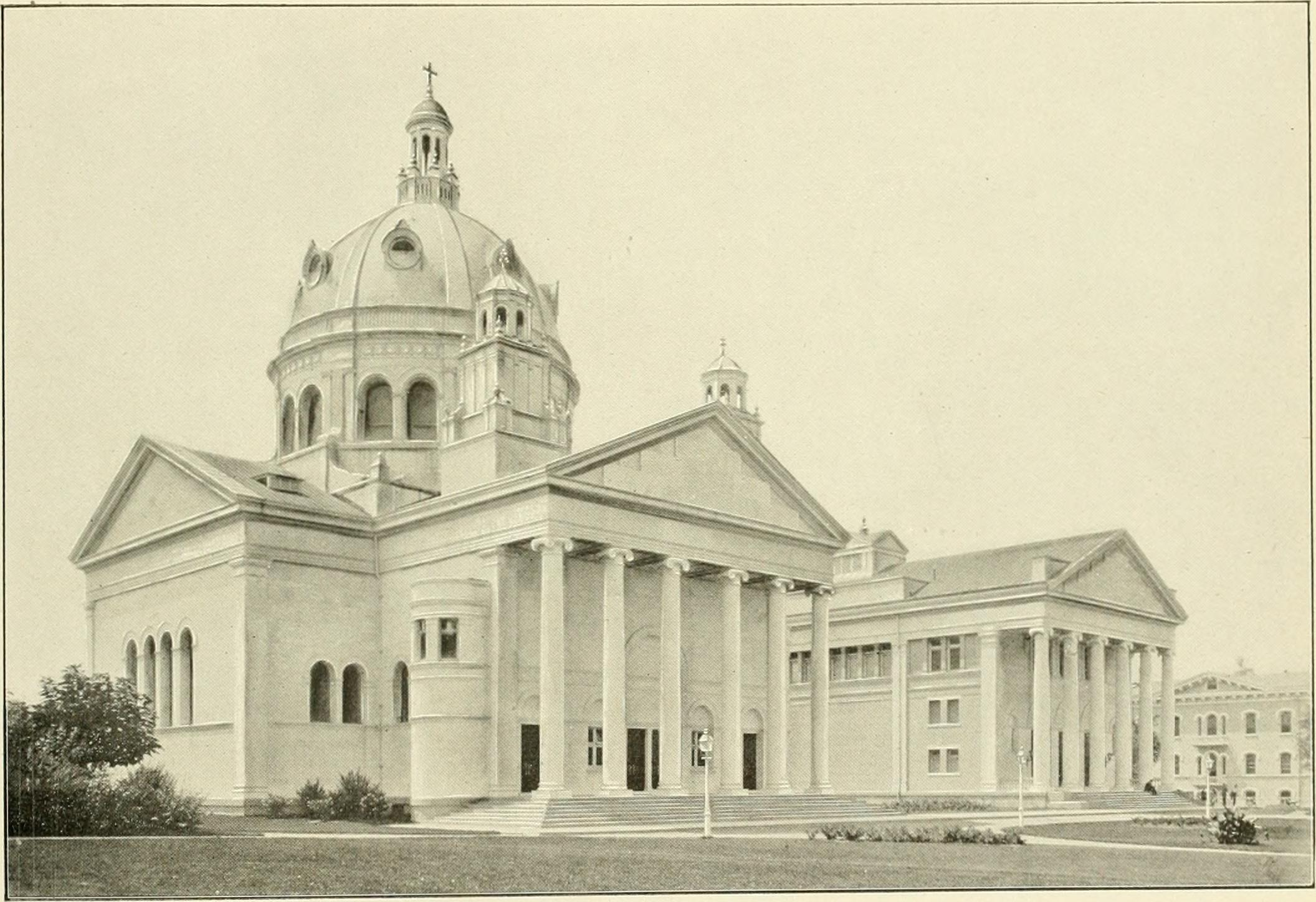
Randall Memorial Church and Snug Harbor Music Hall, Sailors' Snug Harbor, Staten Island, New York, 1890–92.

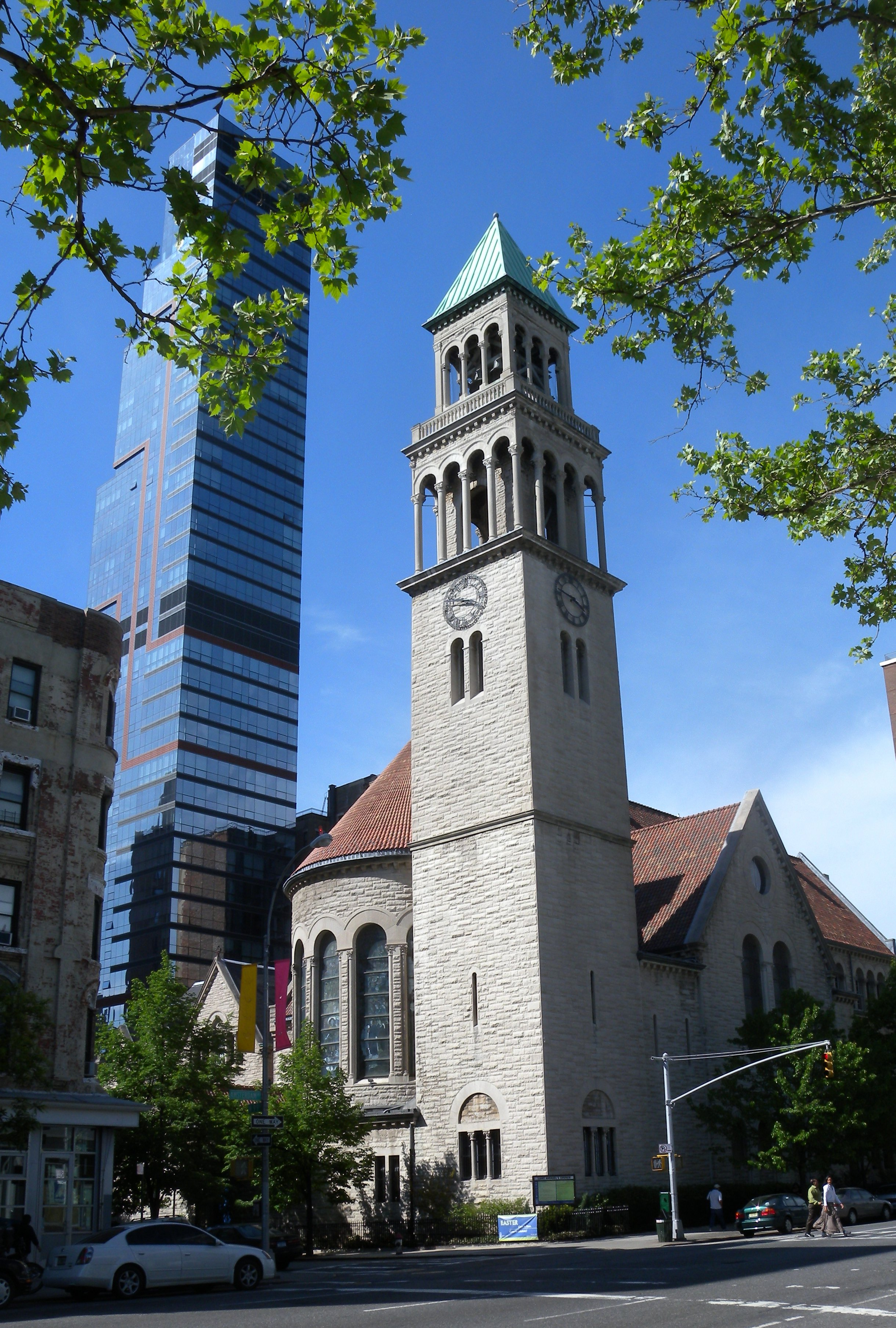
St. Michael Episcopal Church, New York, New York, 1890–91.

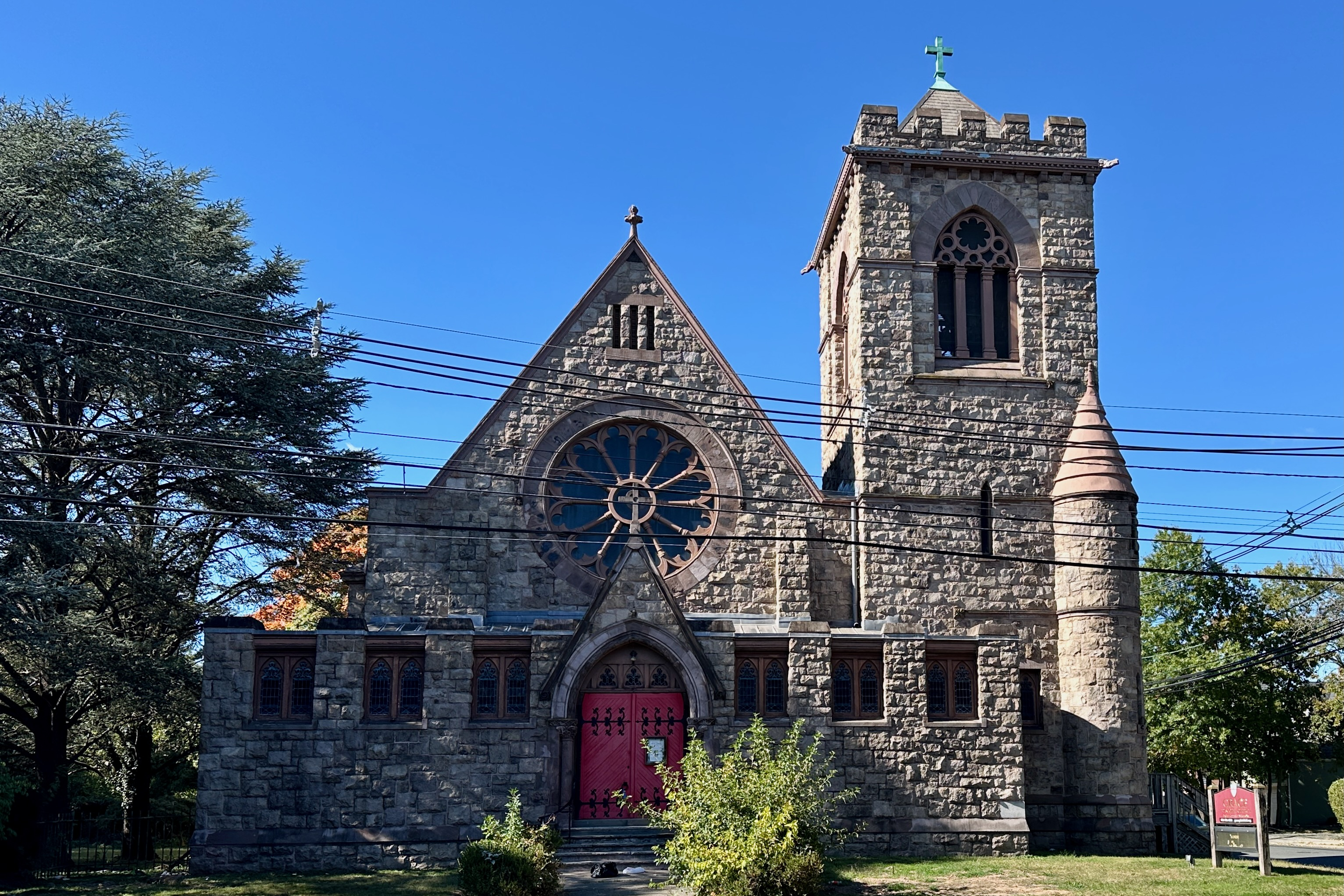
Grace Episcopal Church, Plainfield, New Jersey, 1891–92.

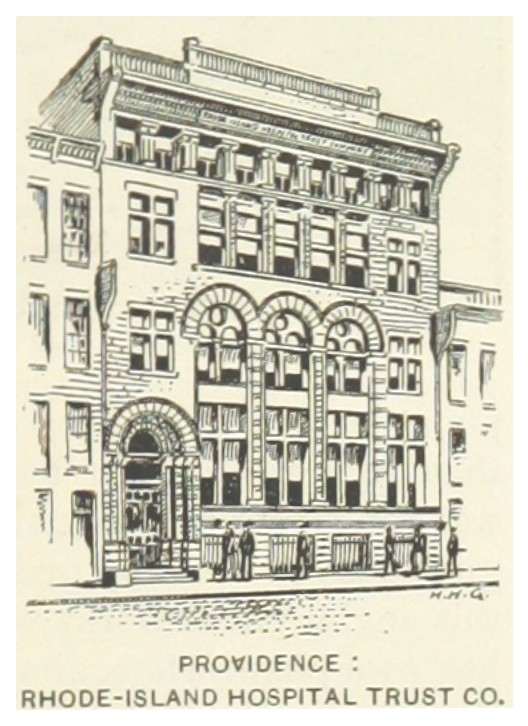
Rhode Island Hospital Trust Company Building, Providence, Rhode Island, 1891.

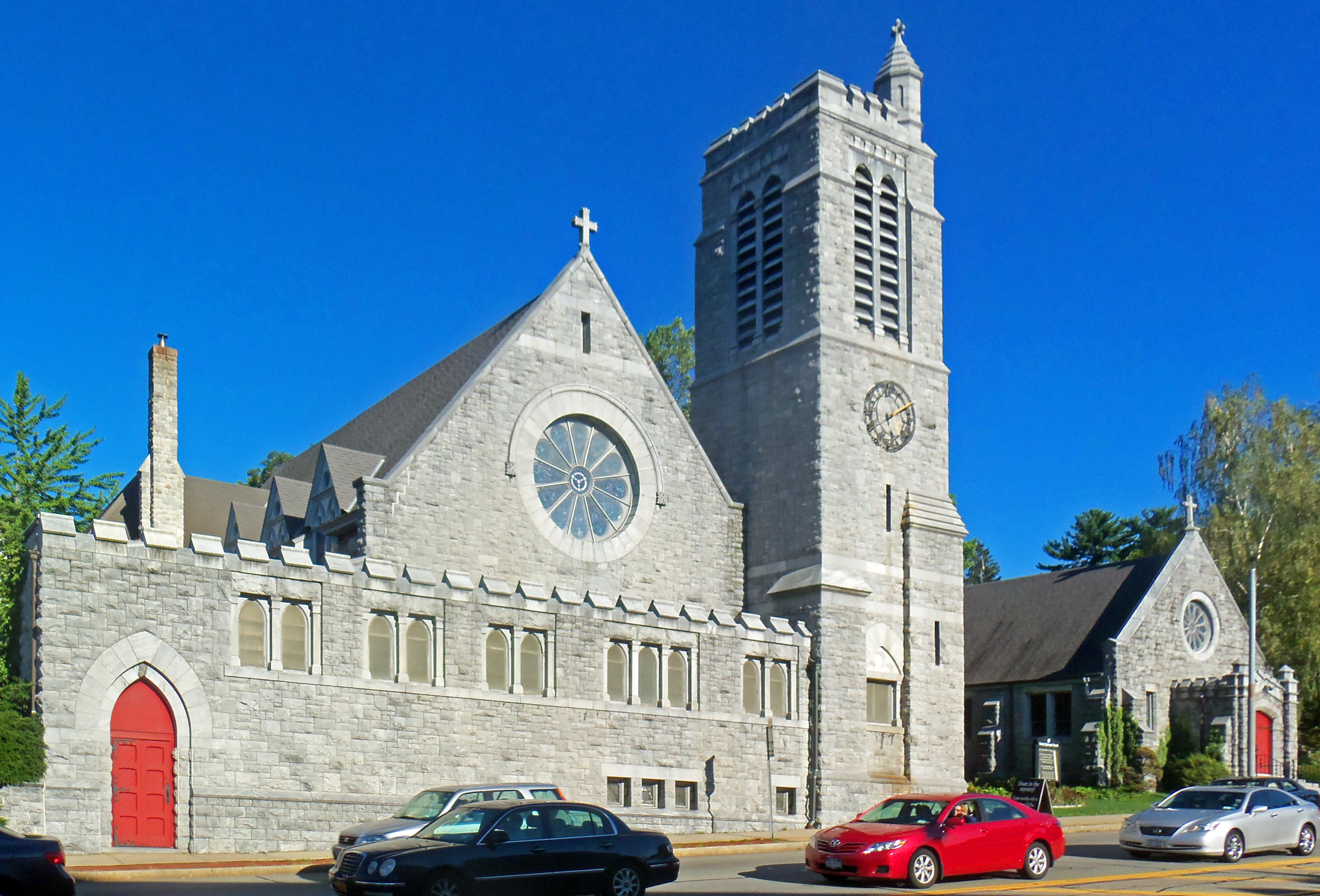
Trinity Episcopal Church, Ossining, New York, 1891.

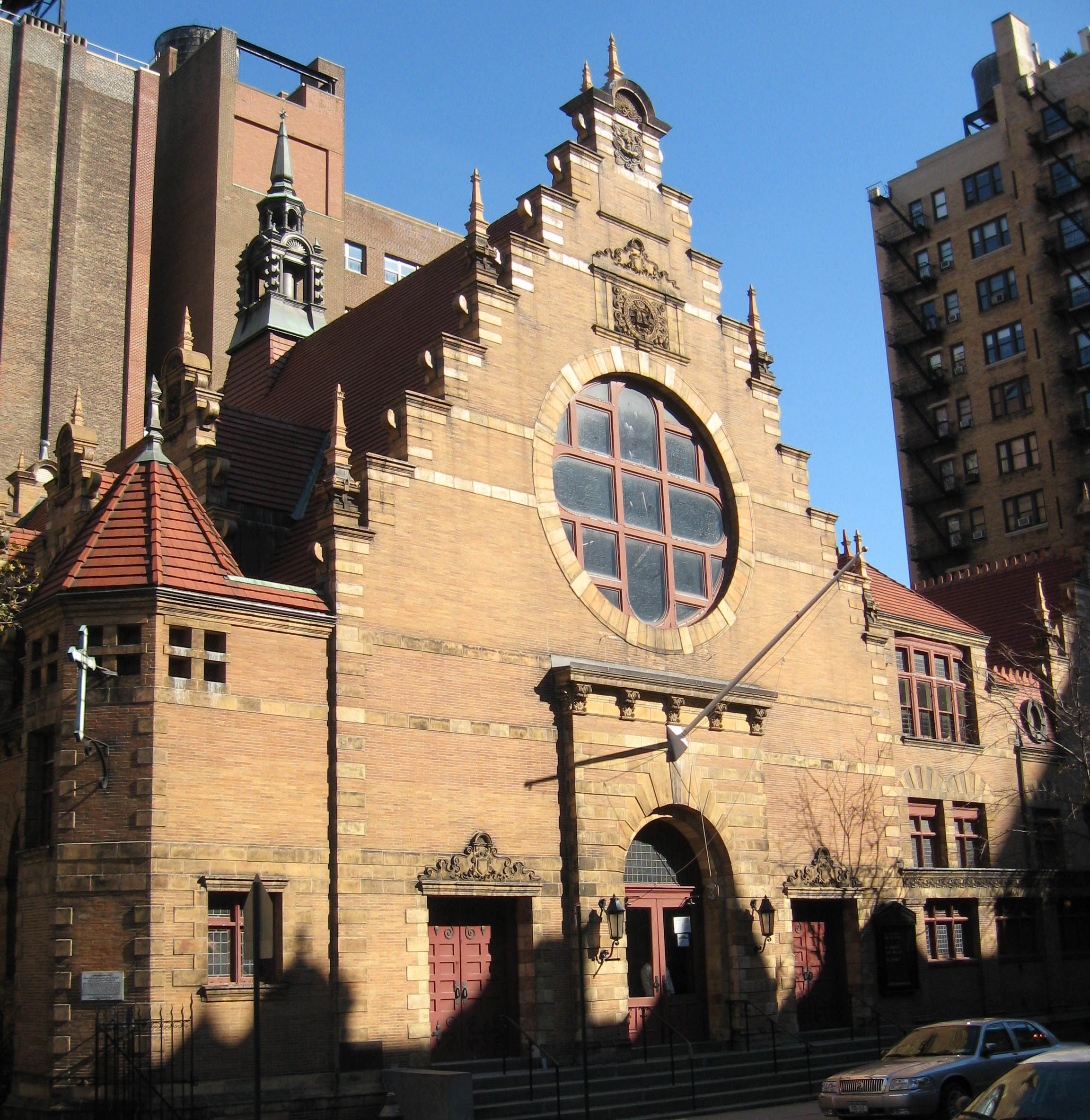
West End Collegiate Church, New York, New York, 1891–92.

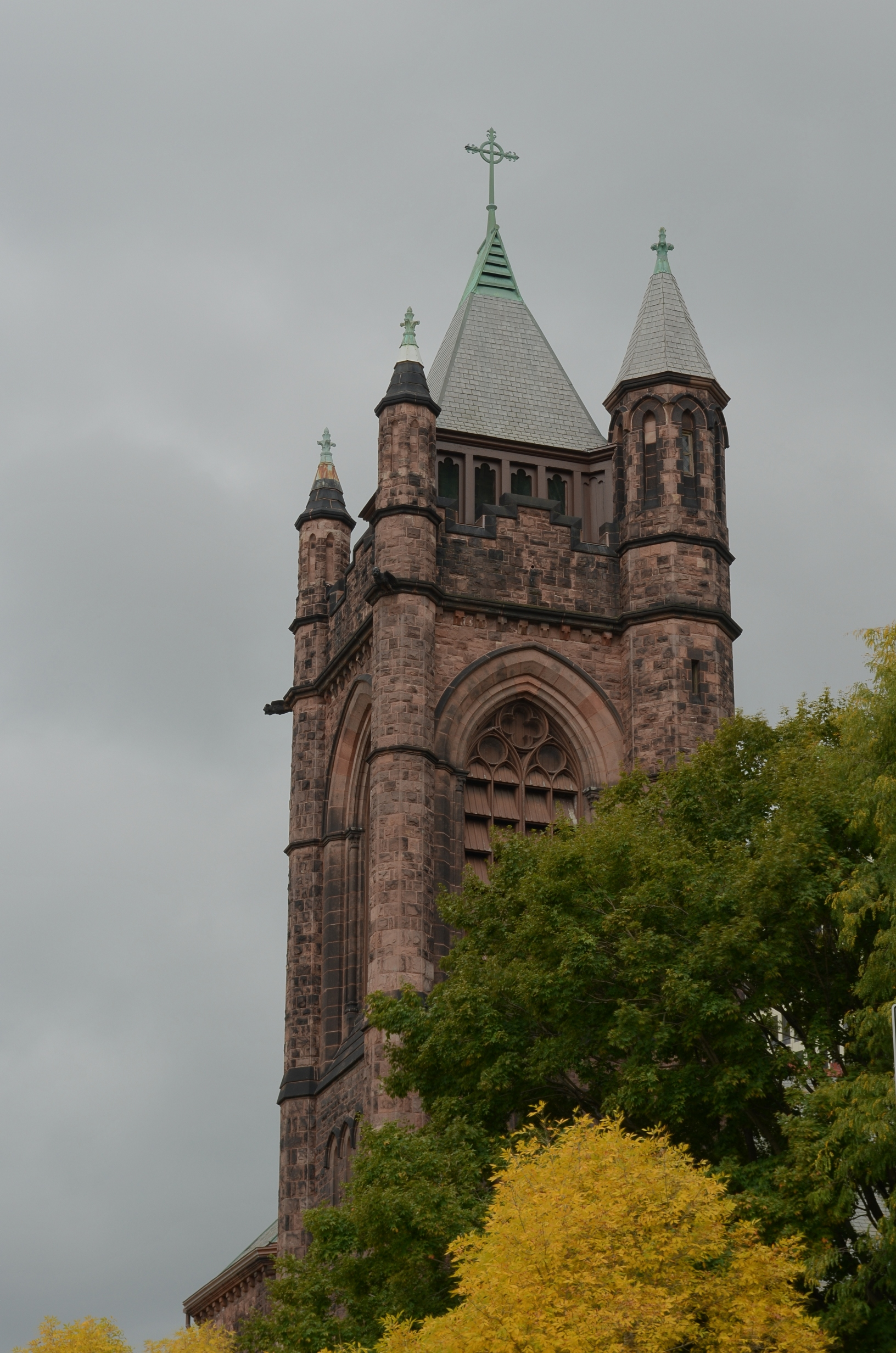
Christ Episcopal Church, Rochester, New York, 1892–94.

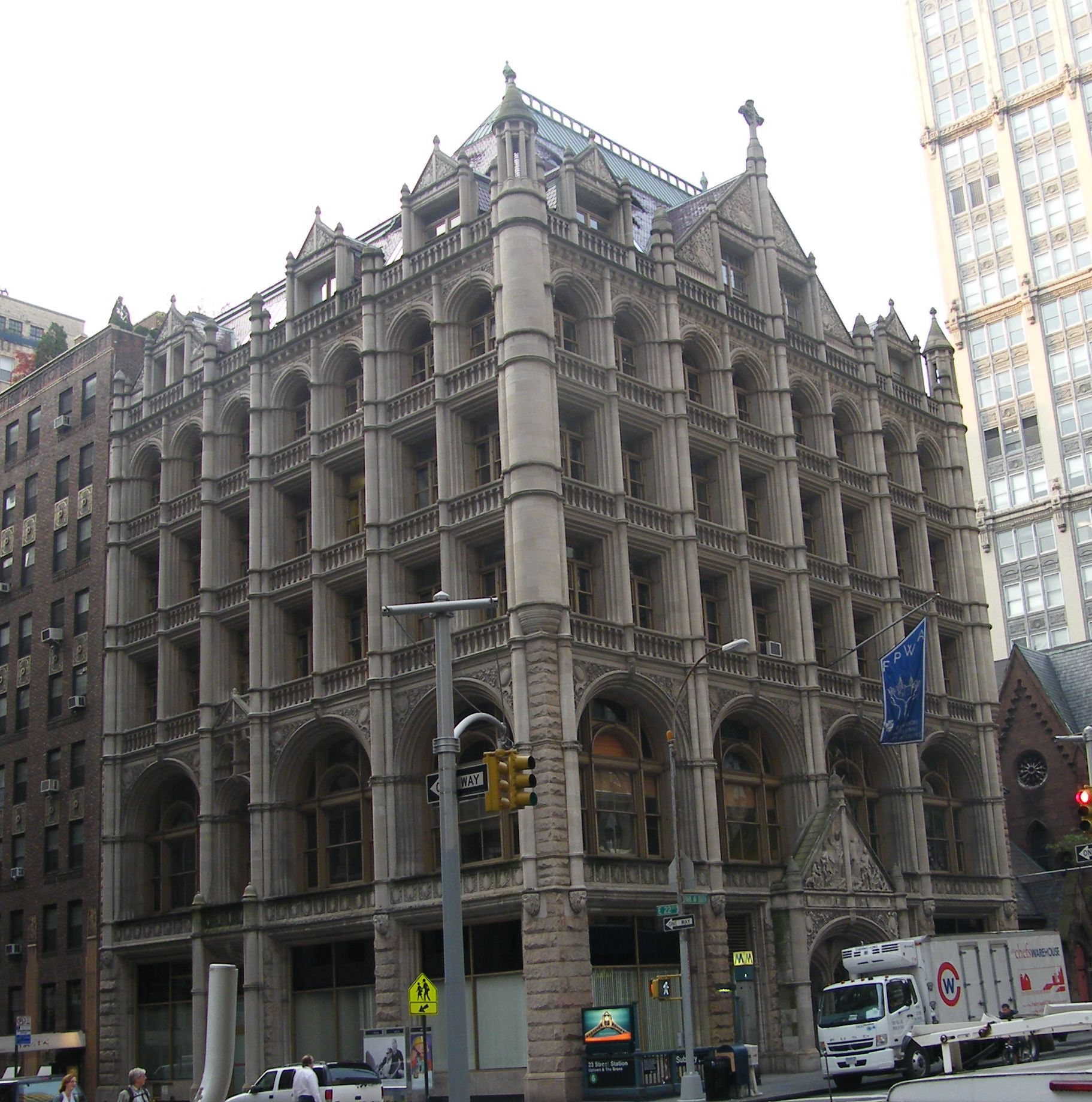
Church Missions House, New York, New York, 1892–94.

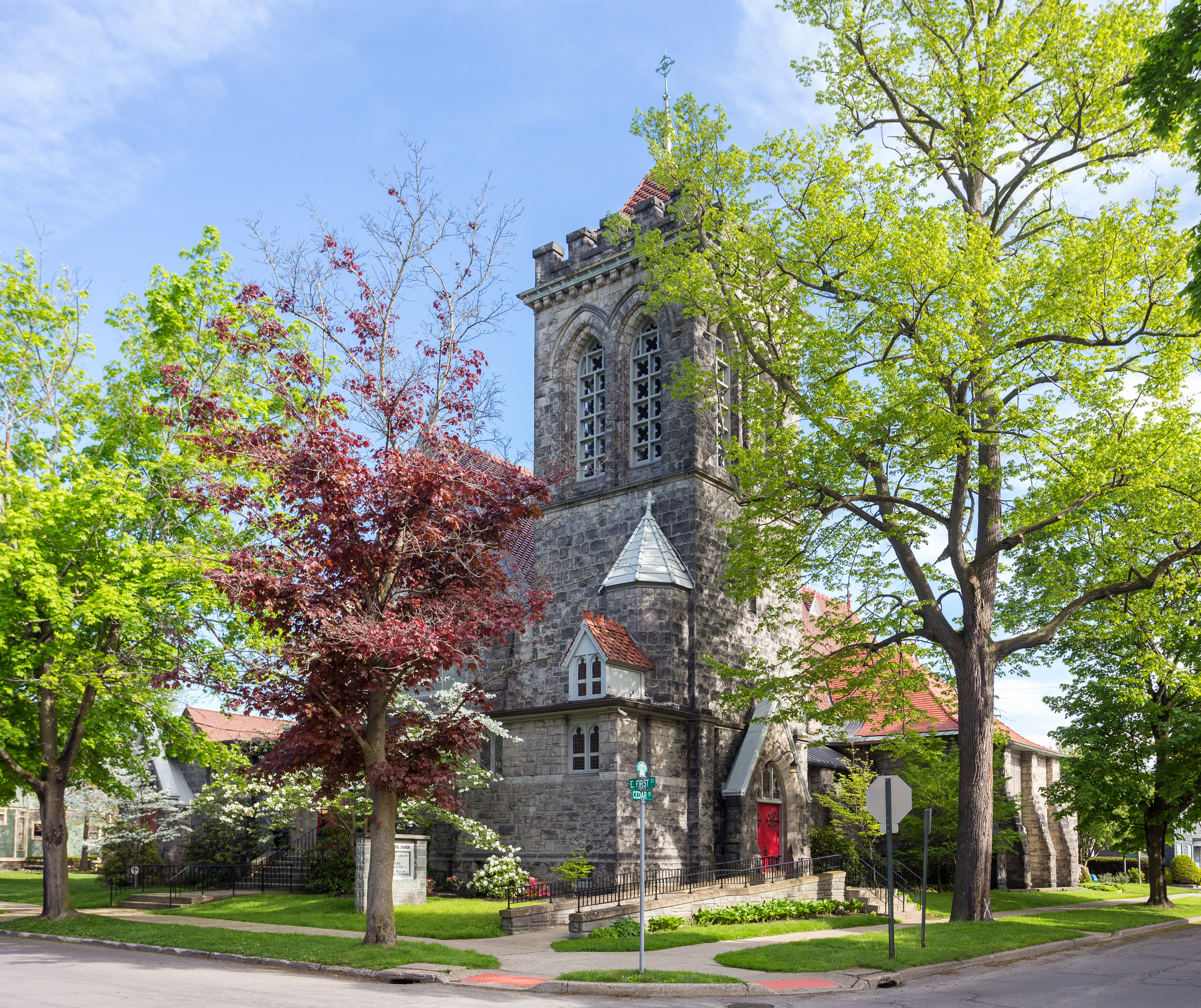
Christ Episcopal Church, Corning, New York, 1893–95.

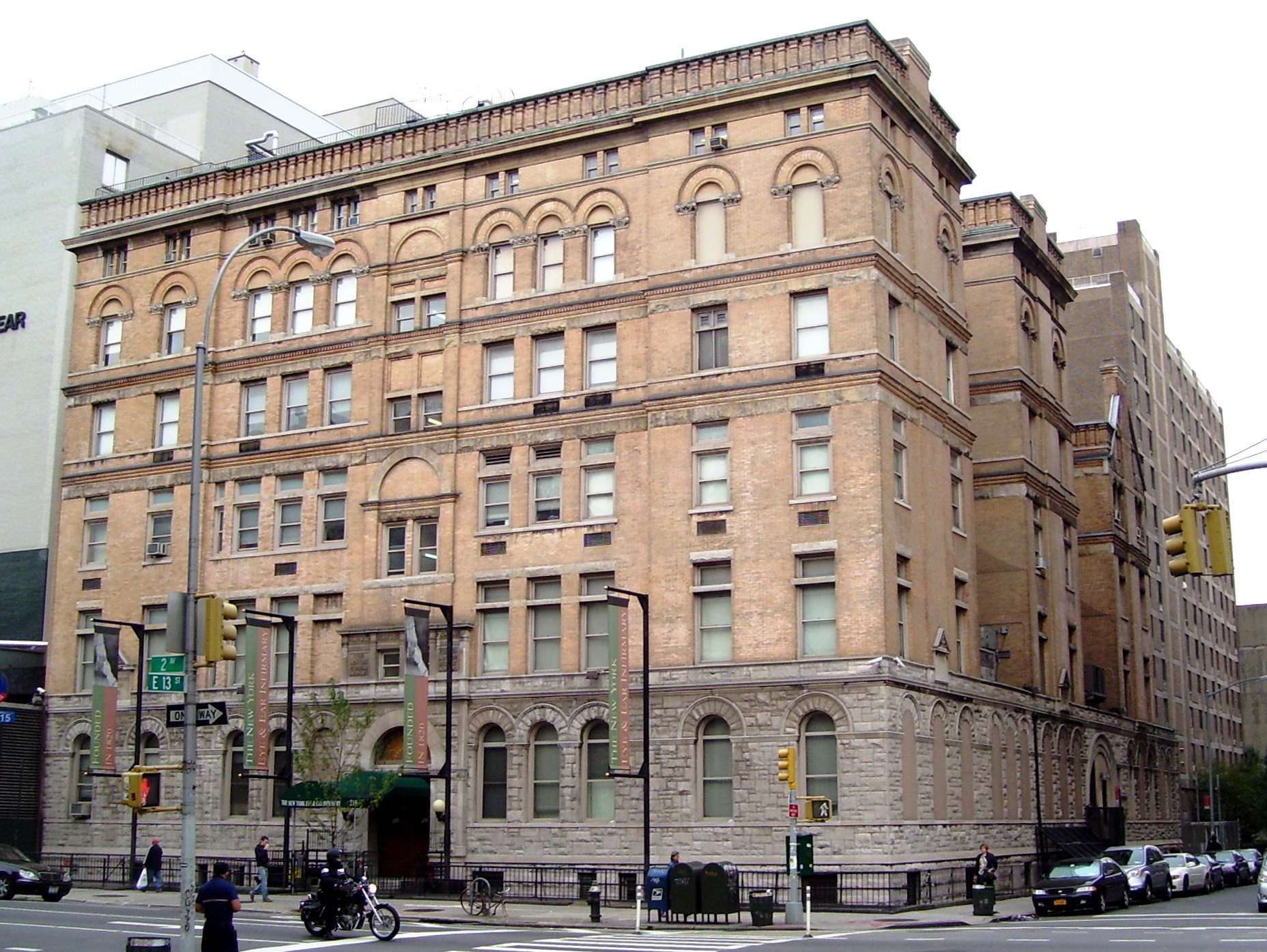
New York Eye and Ear Infirmary, New York, New York, 1893 et seq.

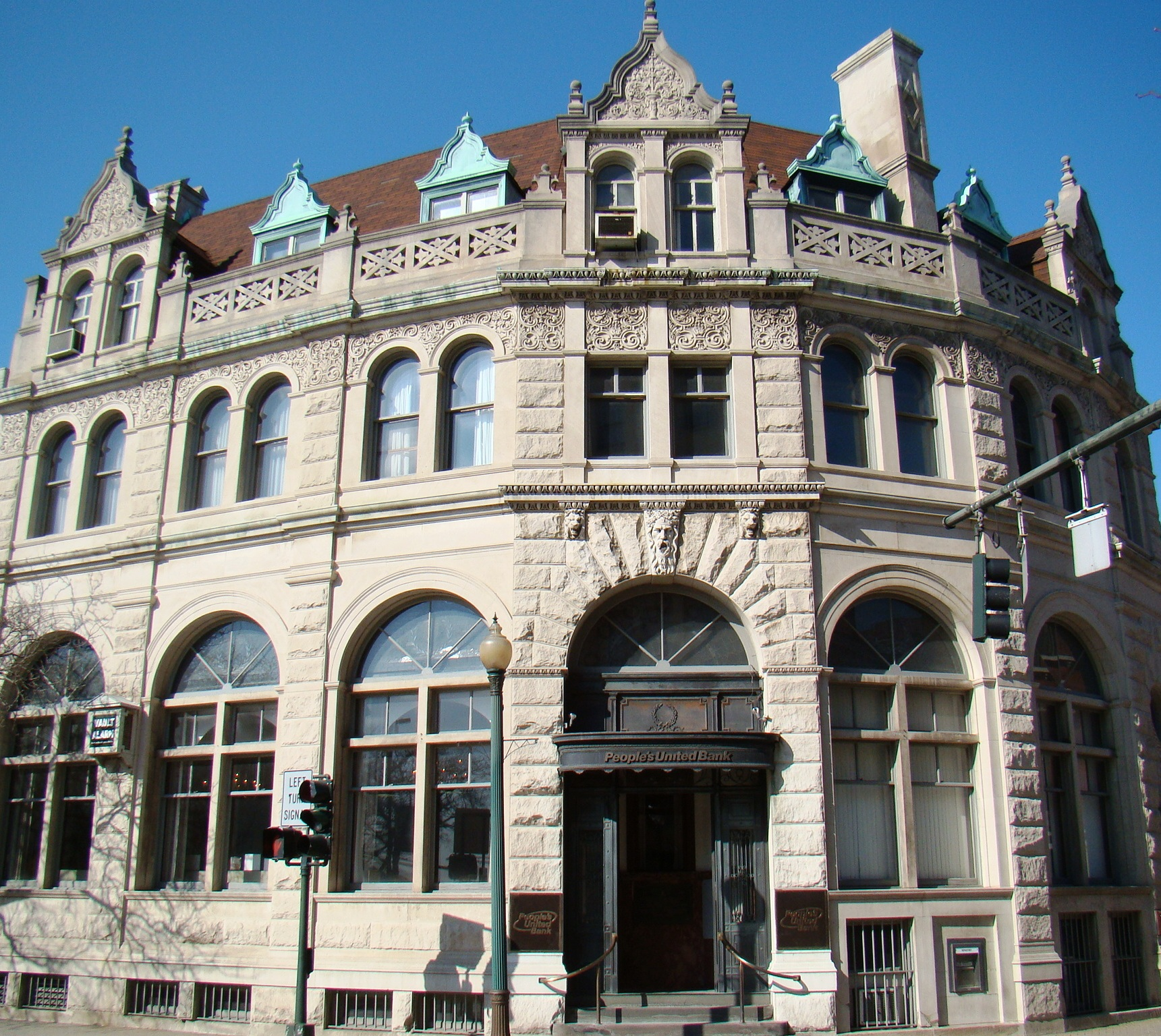
Norwich Savings Society Building, Norwich, Connecticut, 1893–95.

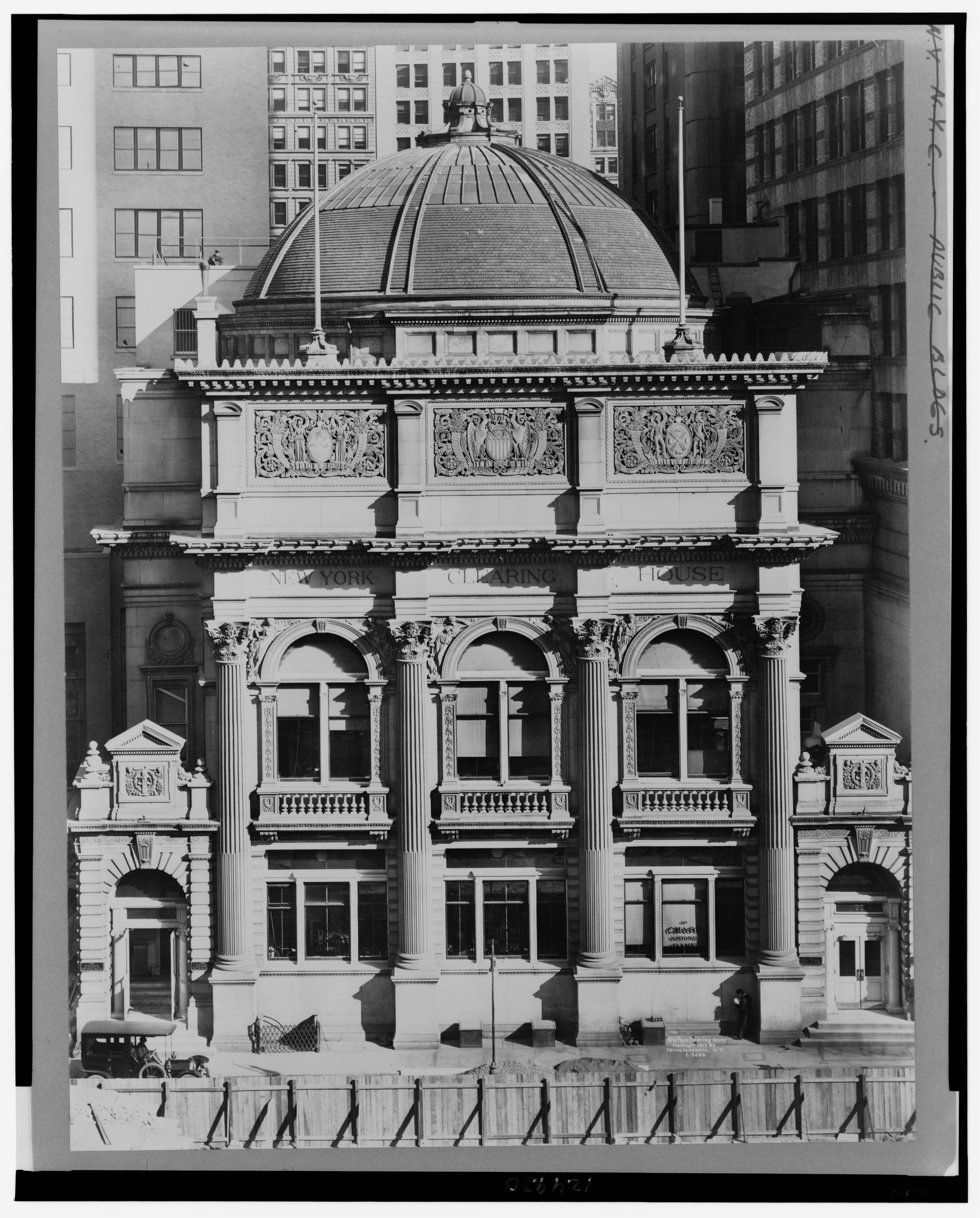
New York Clearing House Association Building, New York, New York, 1894–96.

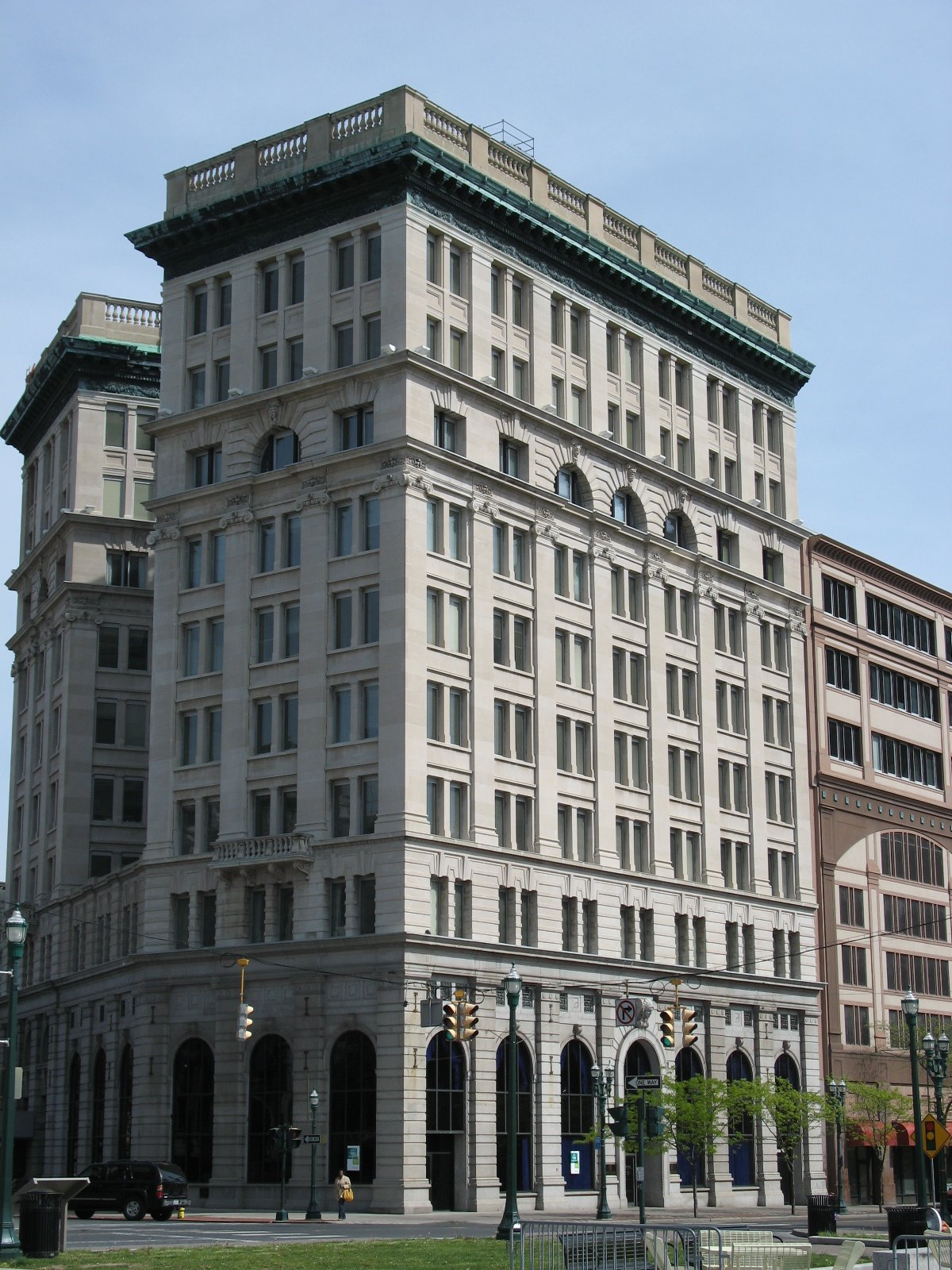
Onondaga County Savings Bank Building, Syracuse, New York, 1896–97.

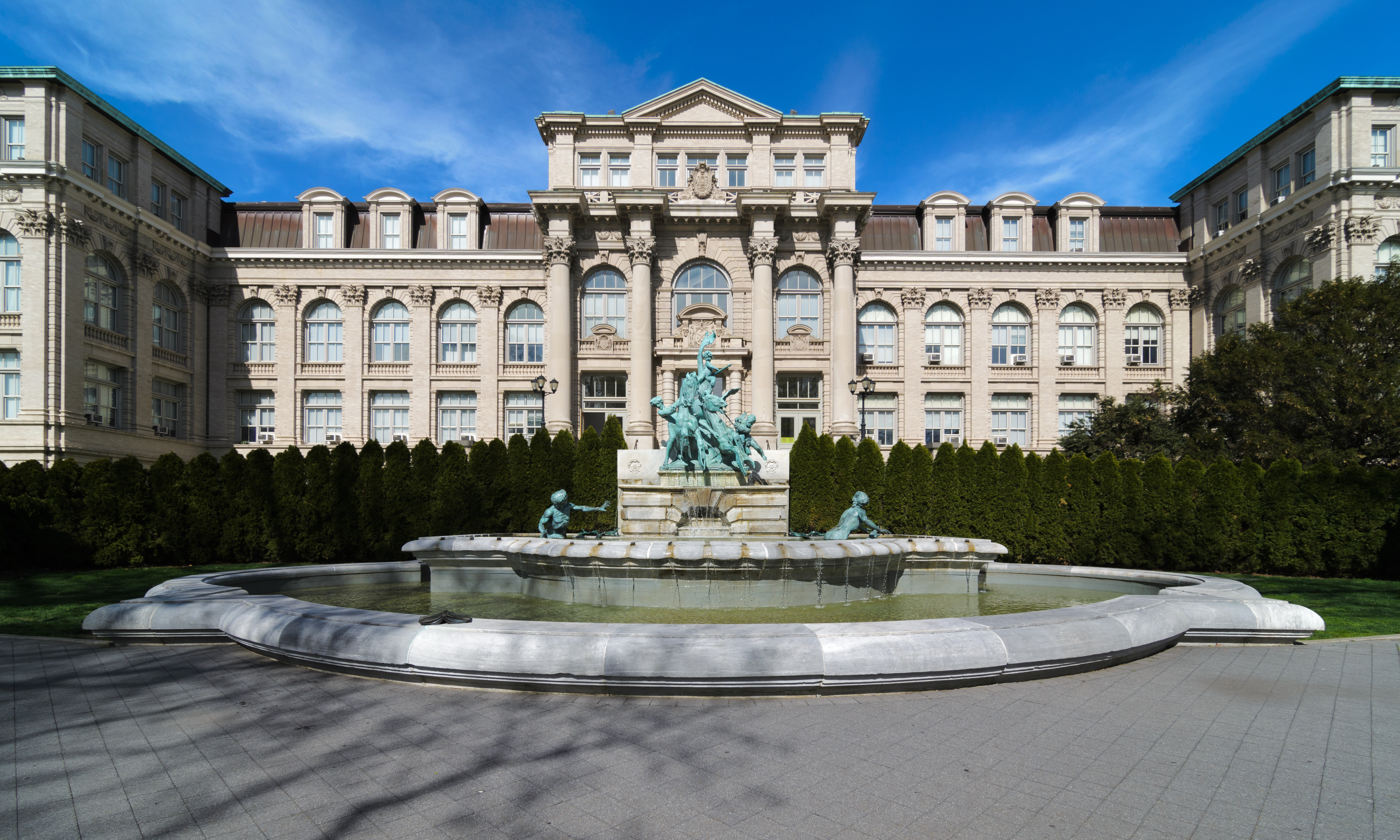
LuEsther T. Mertz Library, New York Botanical Garden, Bronx, New York, 1897–1901.

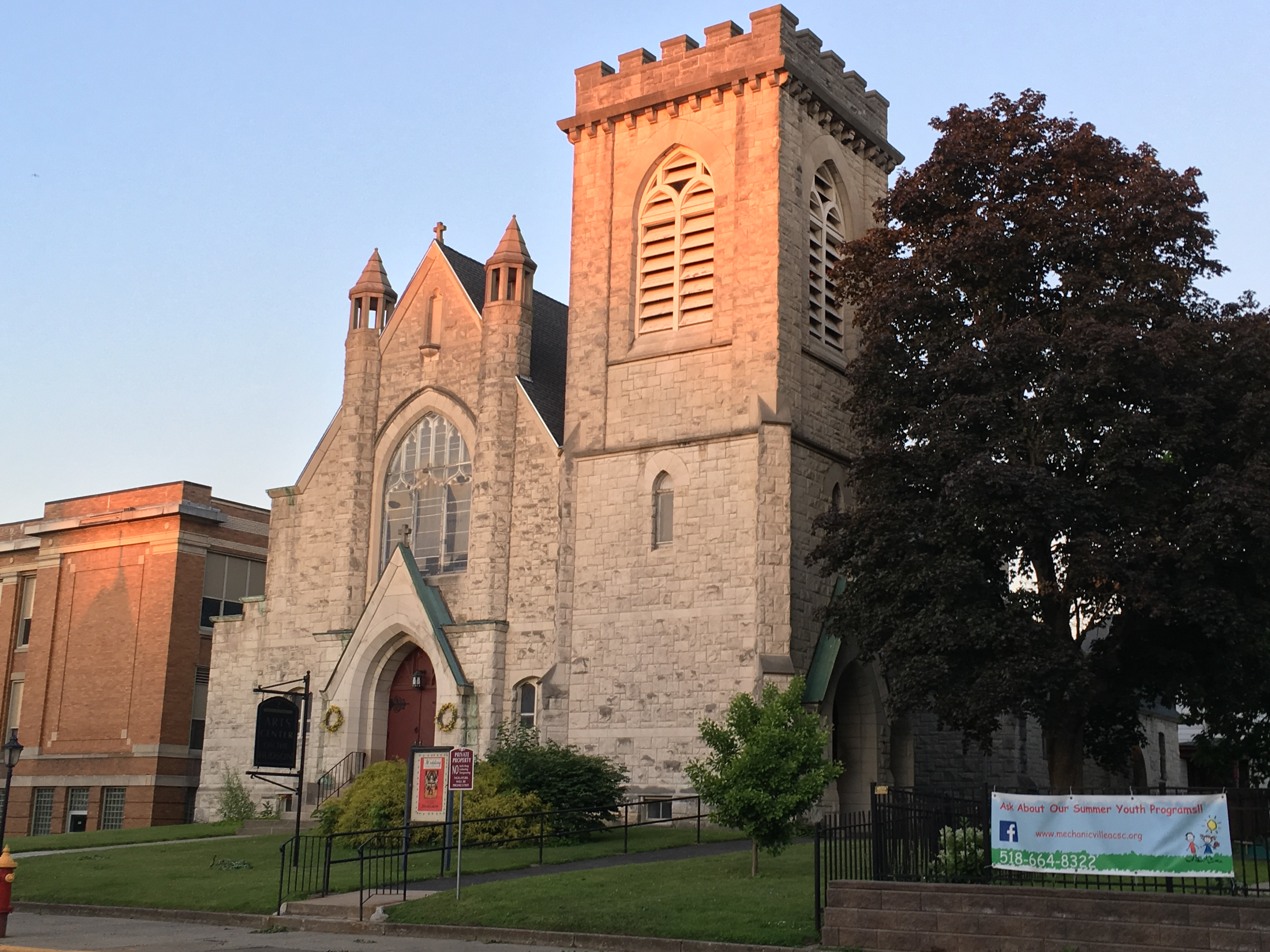
St. Luke Episcopal Church, Mechanicville, New York, 1897–98.

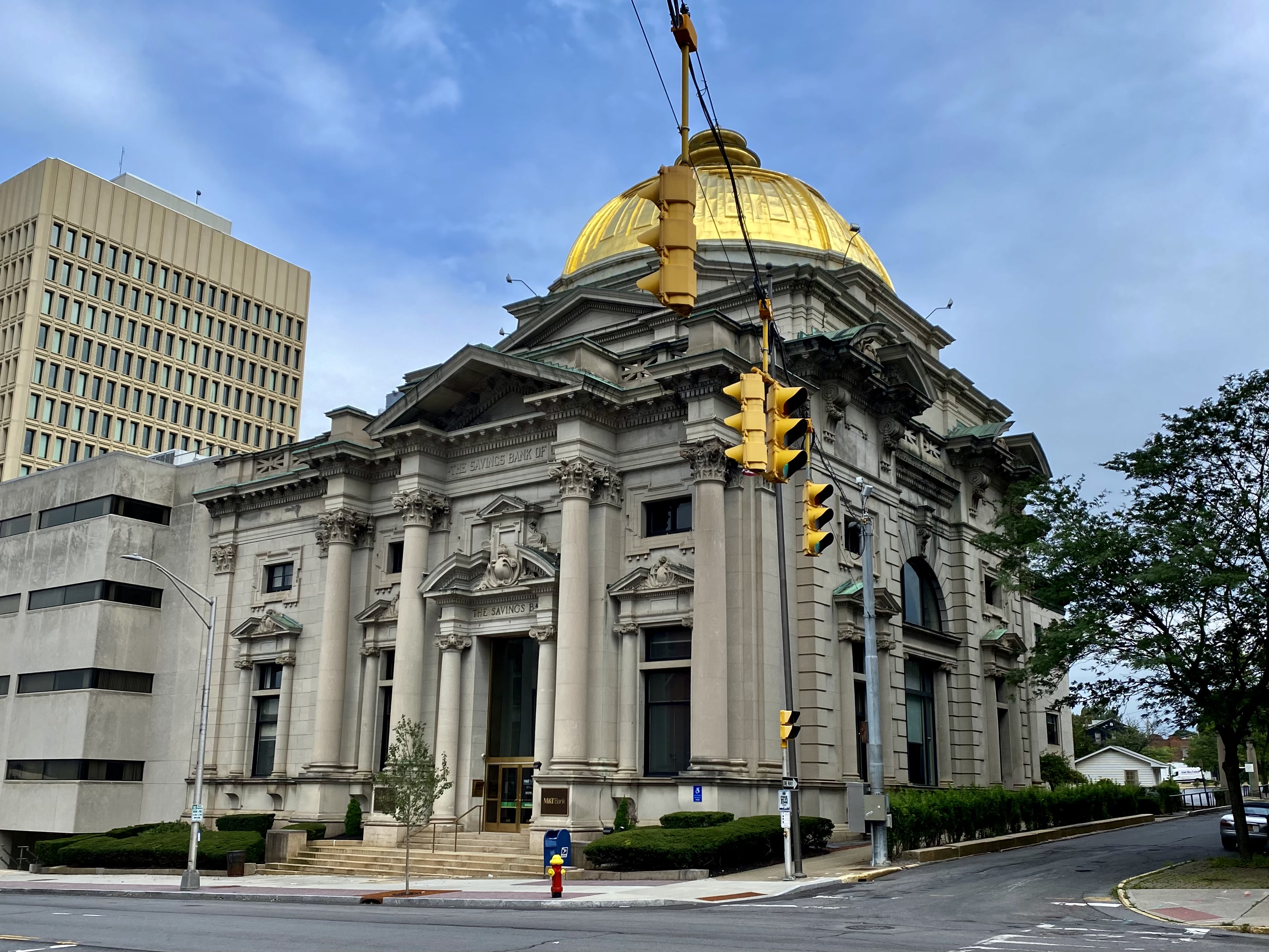
Savings Bank of Utica Building, Utica, New York, 1898.

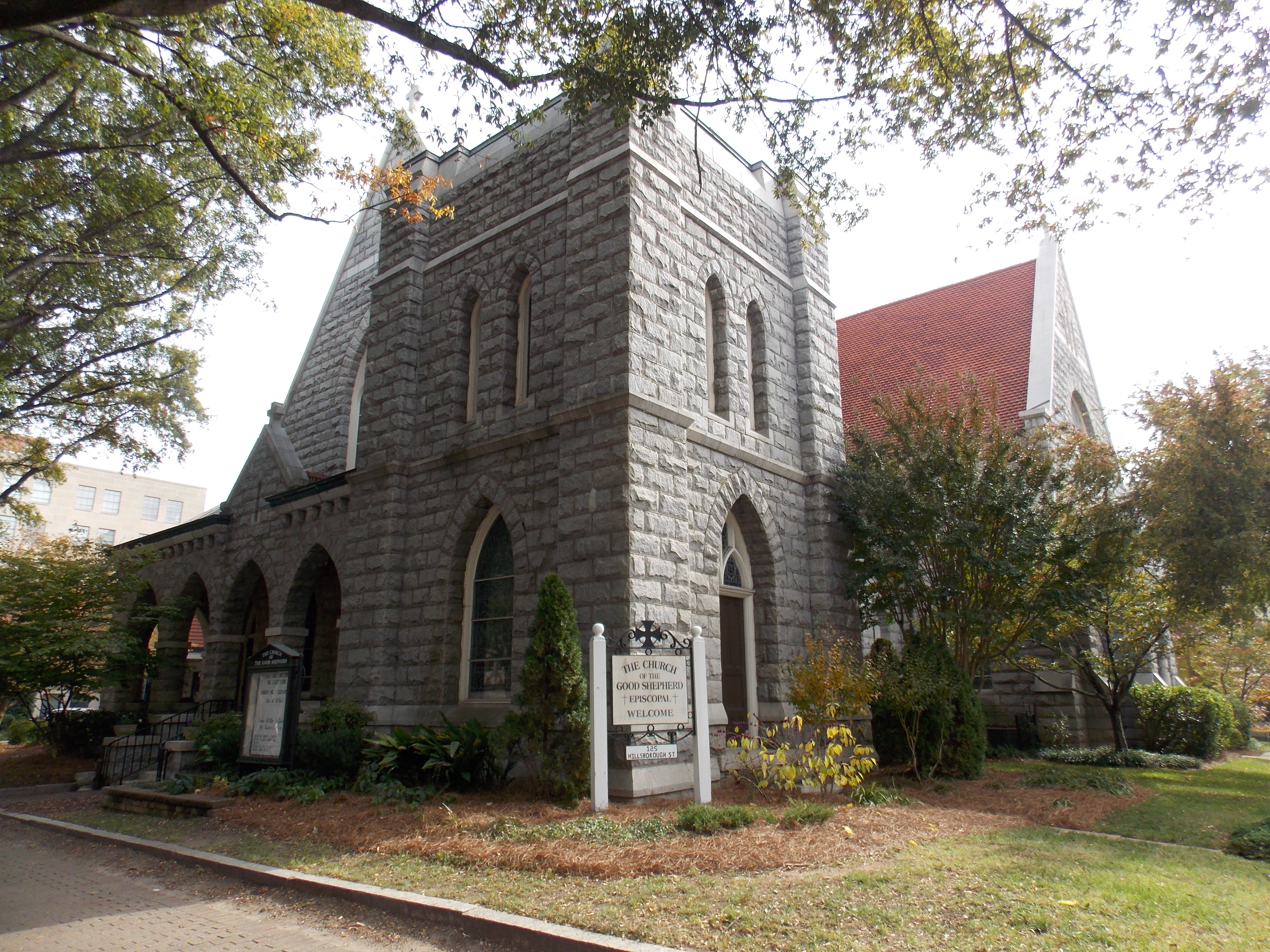
Episcopal Church of the Good Shepherd, Raleigh, North Carolina, 1899–1914.

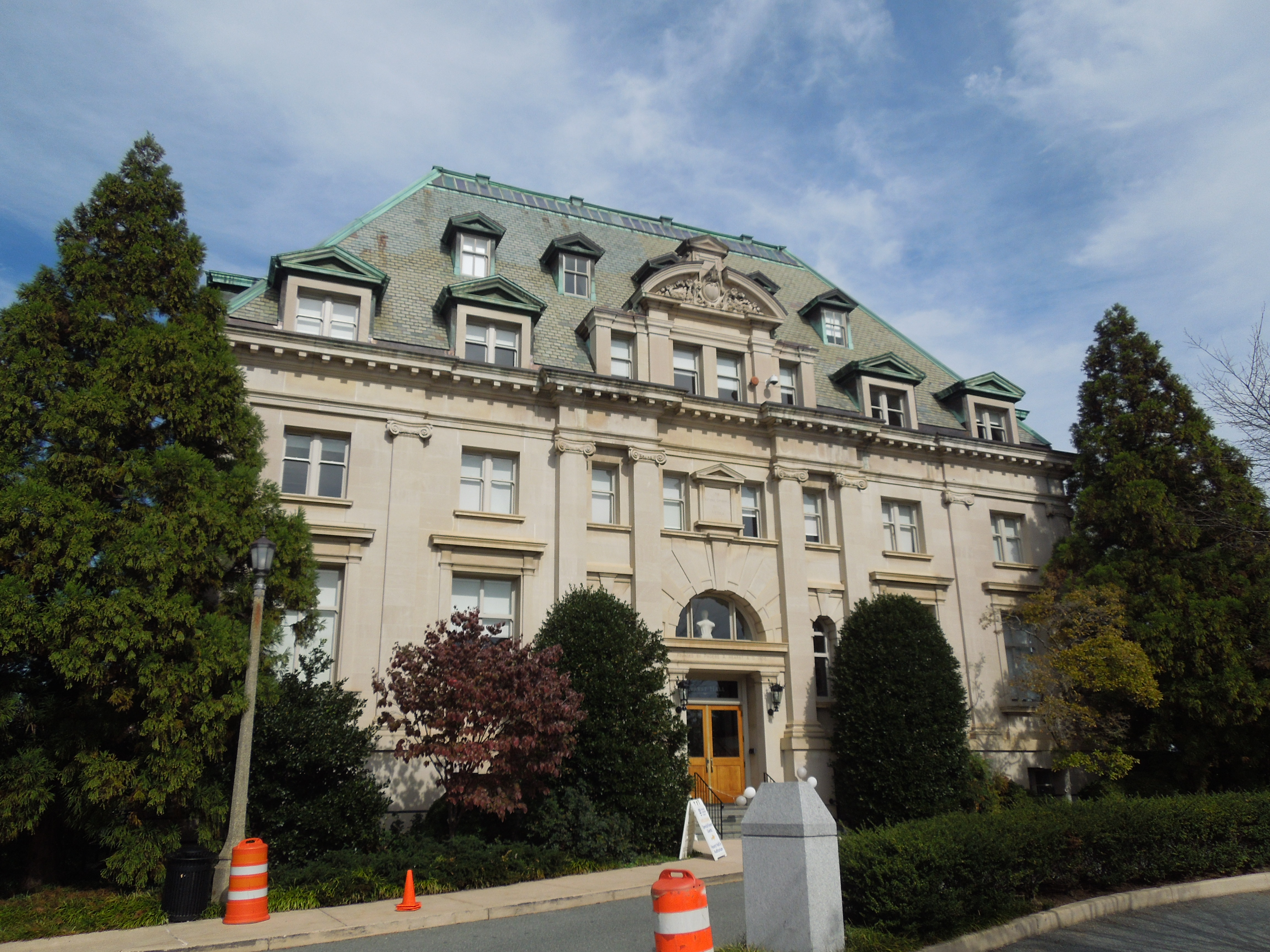
Hearst Hall, National Cathedral School, Washington, D.C., 1899–1900.

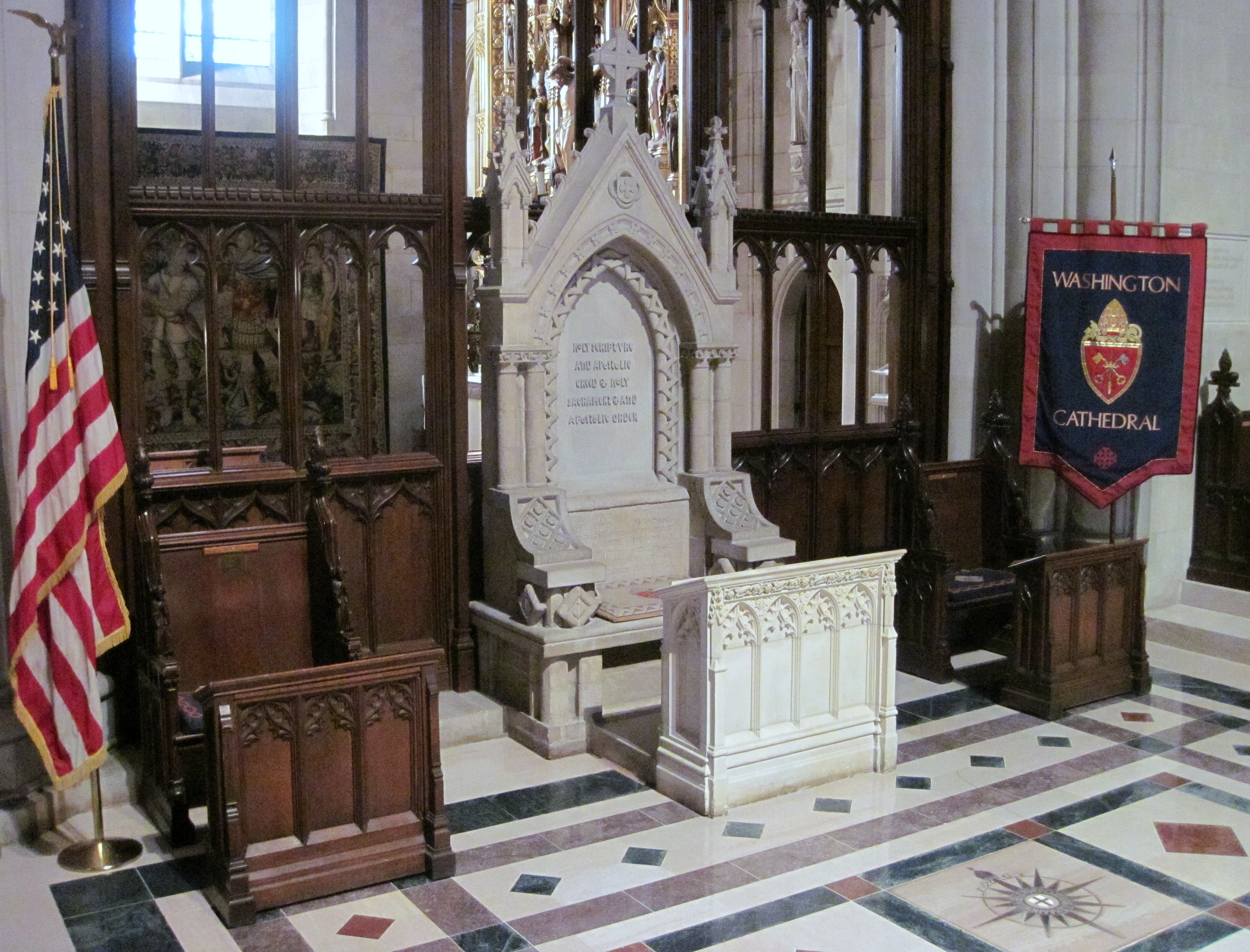
Glastonbury Cathedra of the Washington National Cathedral, Washington, D.C., 1901.

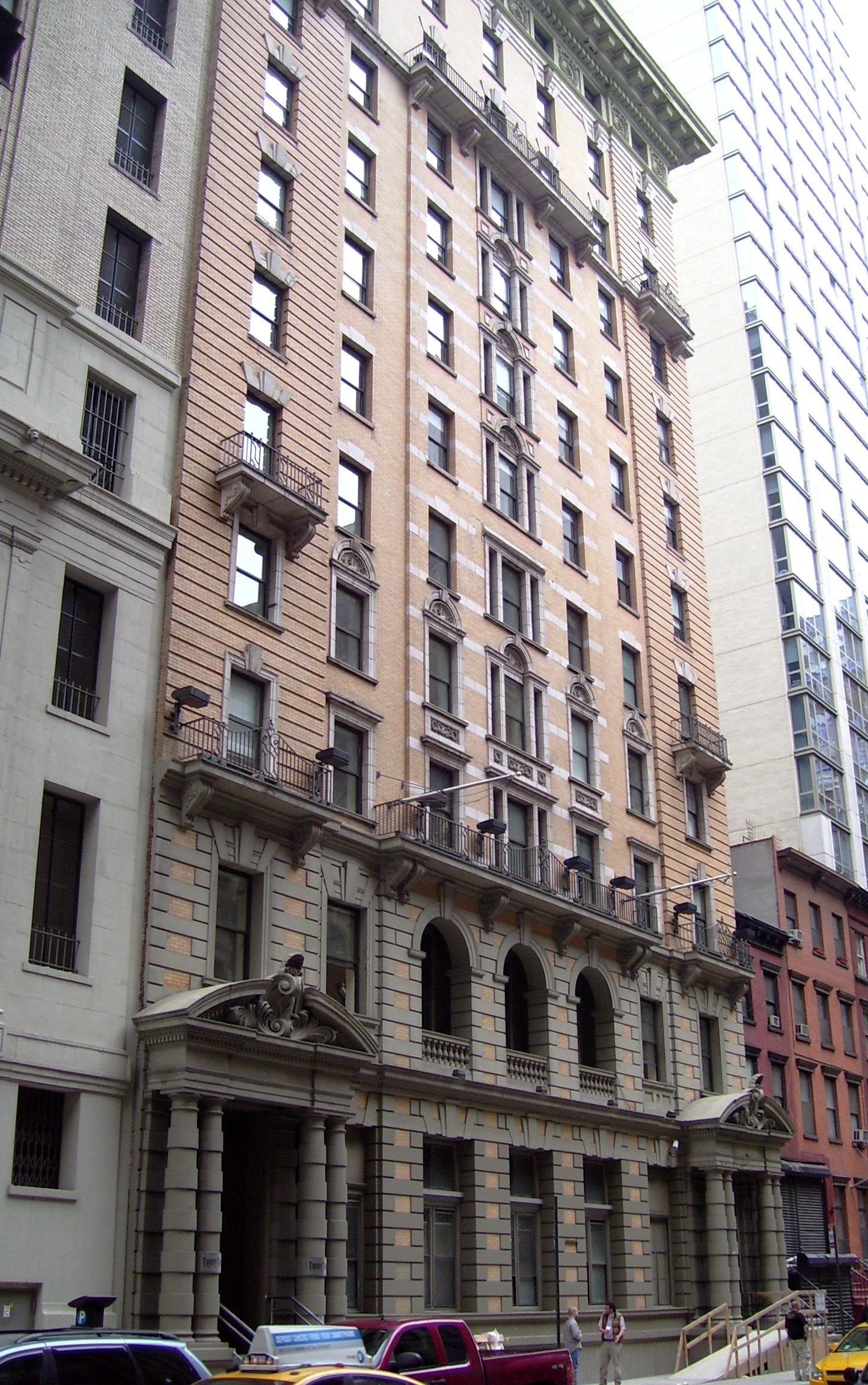
Martha Washington Hotel, New York, New York, 1901–03.

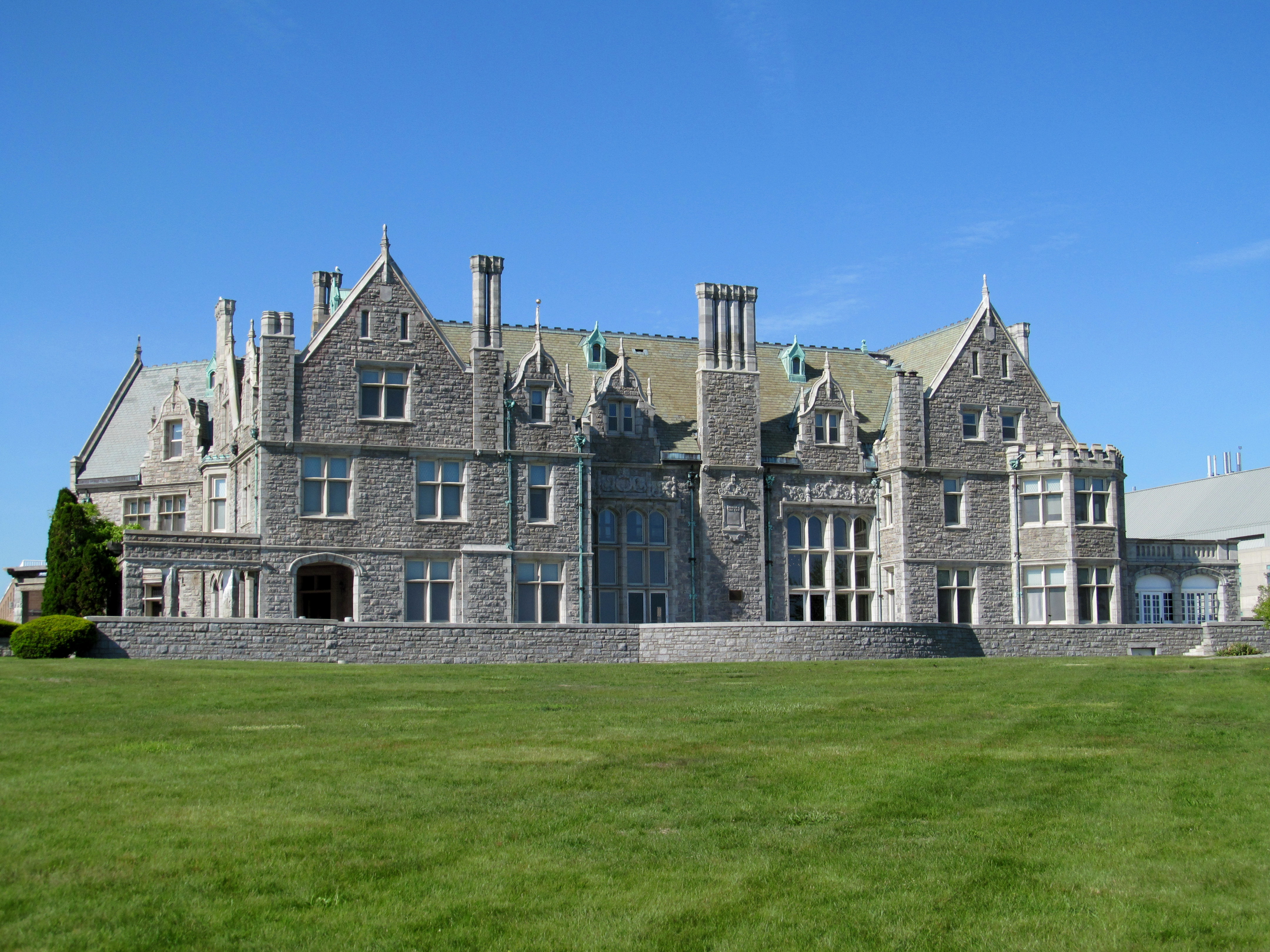
Branford House, Groton, Connecticut, 1902–04.

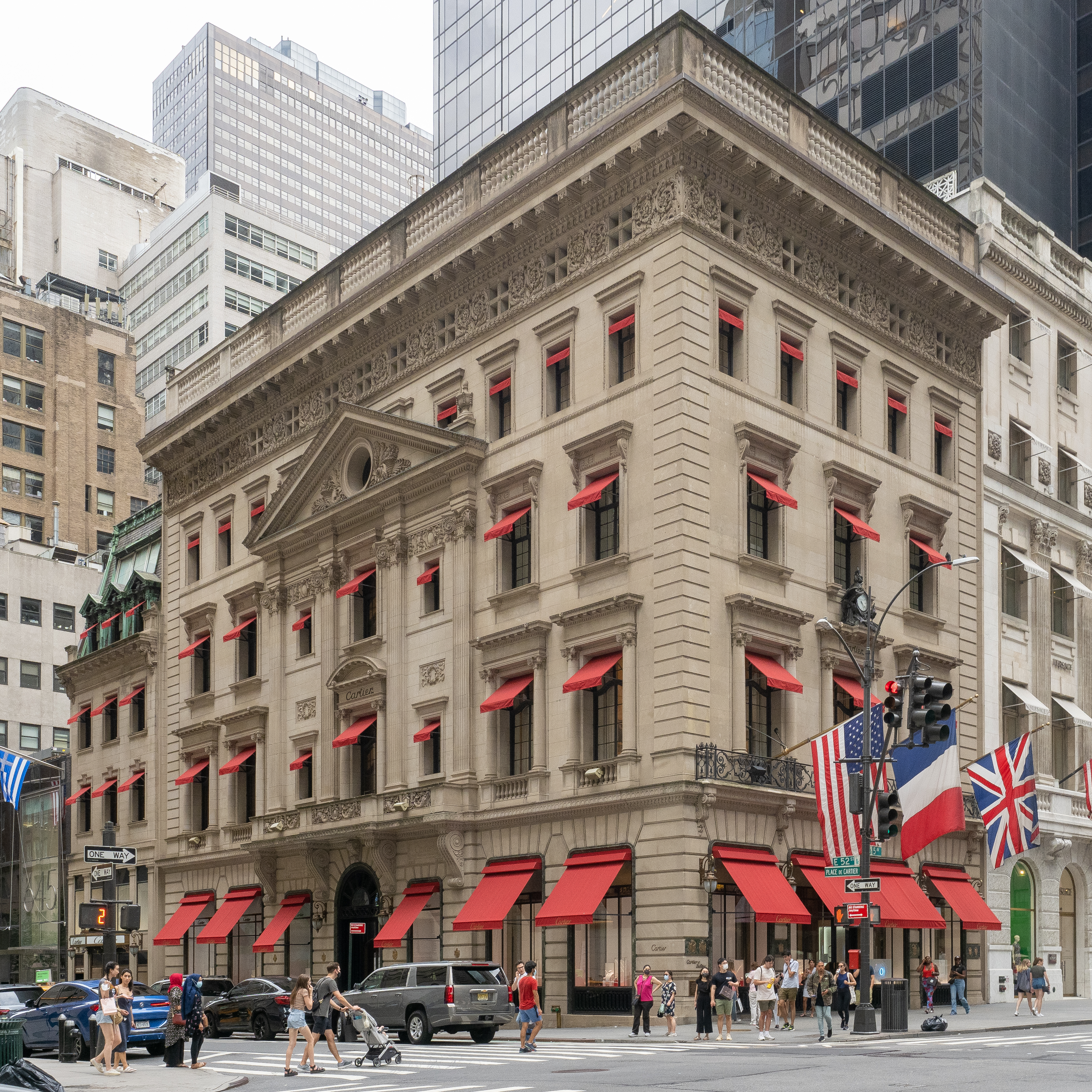
House for Morton F. Plant, New York, New York, 1903–05.

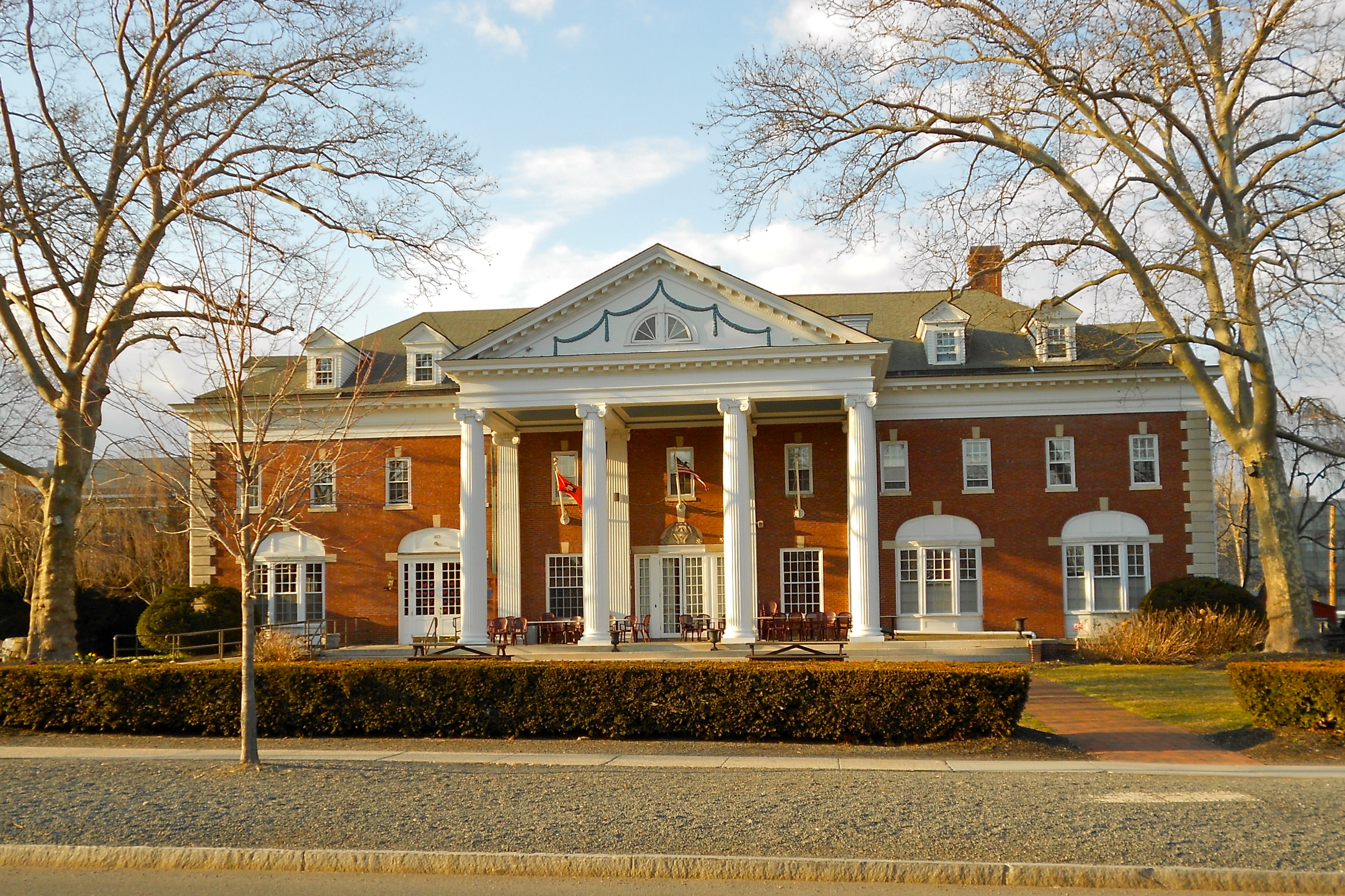
Colonial Club, Princeton, New Jersey, 1905–06.

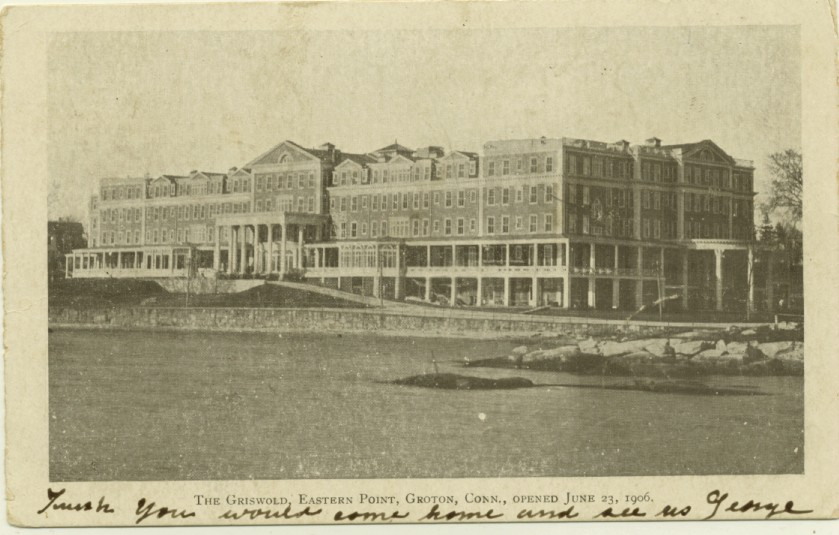
Griswold Hotel, Groton, Connecticut, 1905–06.

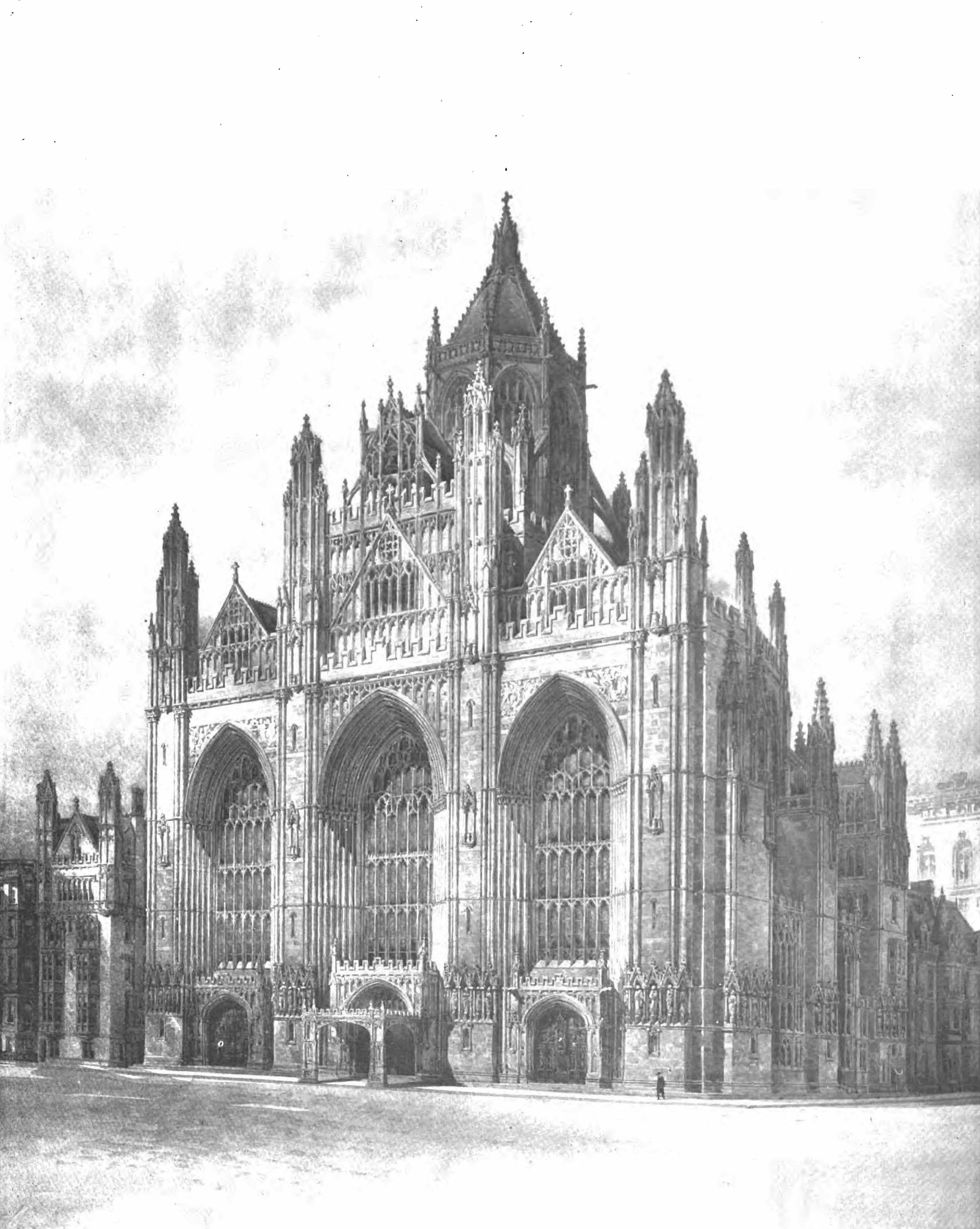
Rejected design for St. Thomas Episcopal Church, New York, New York, 1906.

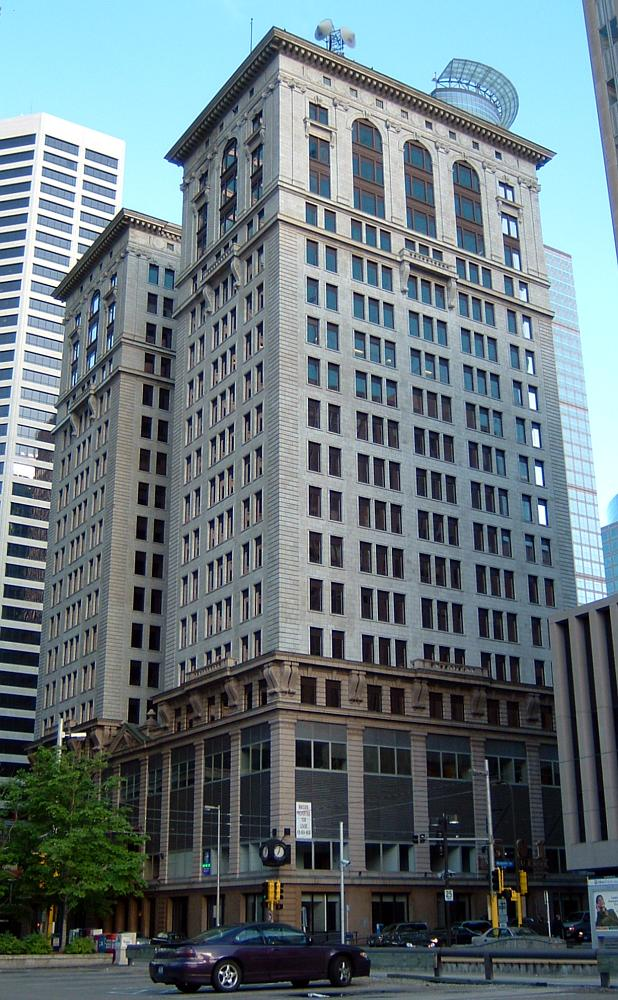
First National Bank-Soo Line Building, Minneapolis, Minnesota, 1914–15.
