= St. Stephen's Episcopal Church (Olean, New York) =

Historic church in New York, United States

- St. Stephen's Episcopal Church Complex
- U.S. National Register of Historic Places
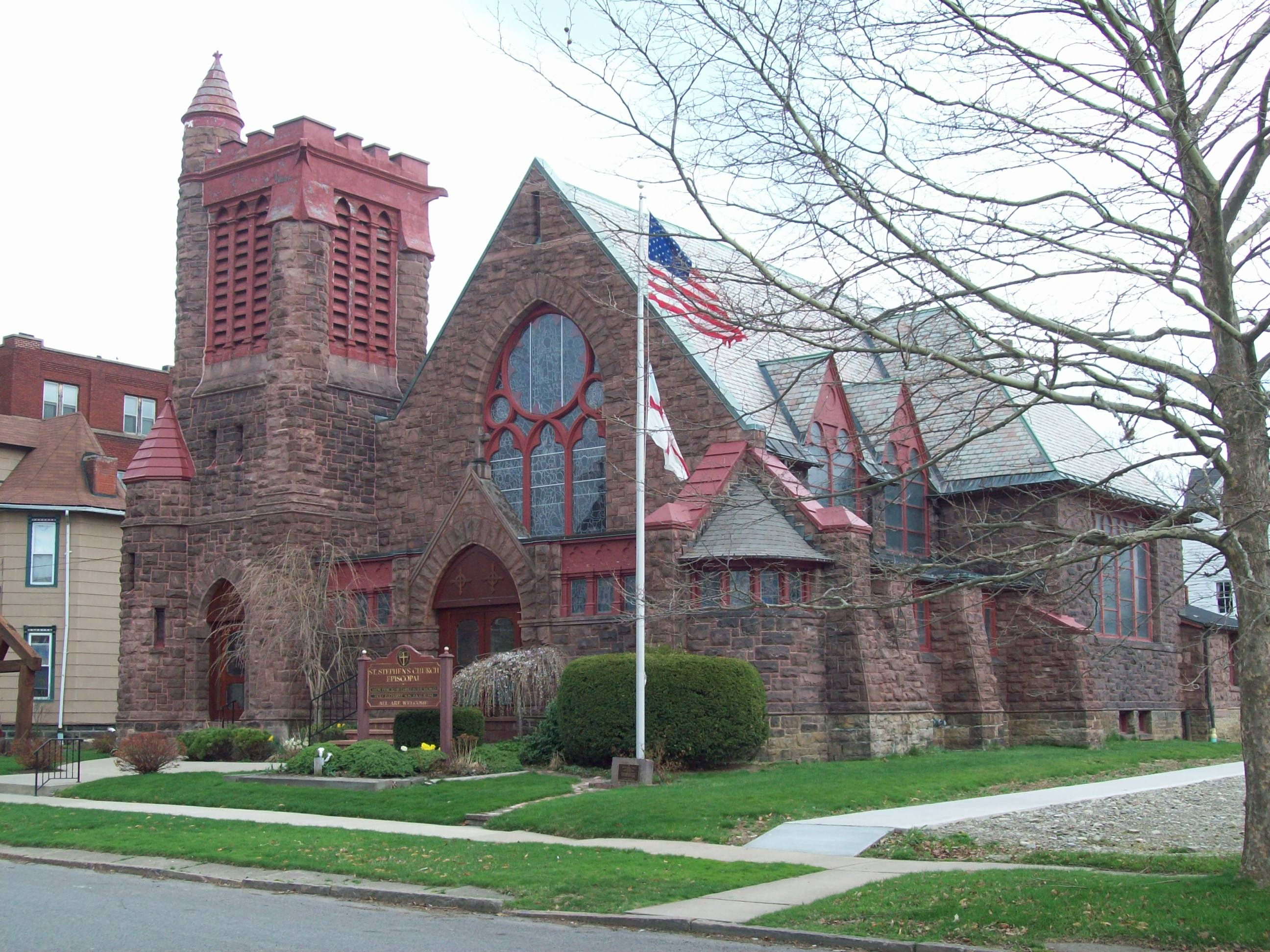
- St. Stephen's Episcopal Church Complex, April 2010

- Location within New York Location within the United States
- Location: 109 S. Barry St., Olean, New York
- Coordinates: 42°4′36″N 78°25′40″W
- Built: 1885, 1889-1890
- Architect: Gibson, Robert W.
- Architectural style: Gothic
- NRHP reference No.: 00001684
- Added to NRHP: January 26, 2001

St. Stephen's Episcopal Church is a historic Episcopal church located at Olean in Cattaraugus County, New York. It is a Gothic Revival style church building designed by upstate New York architect Robert W. Gibson (1854–1927) and constructed 1889–1890. The complex also includes the Ashton Parish House, constructed 1922–1923, and the rectory, known as the Watson Wing, built about 1885. It is home to Olean's oldest continuously operating congregation, established in 1830.

It was listed on the National Register of Historic Places in 2001.
