= Onondaga County Savings Bank =

Historic commercial building in New York, United States

- Onondaga County Savings Bank Building
- U.S. Historic district – Contributing property
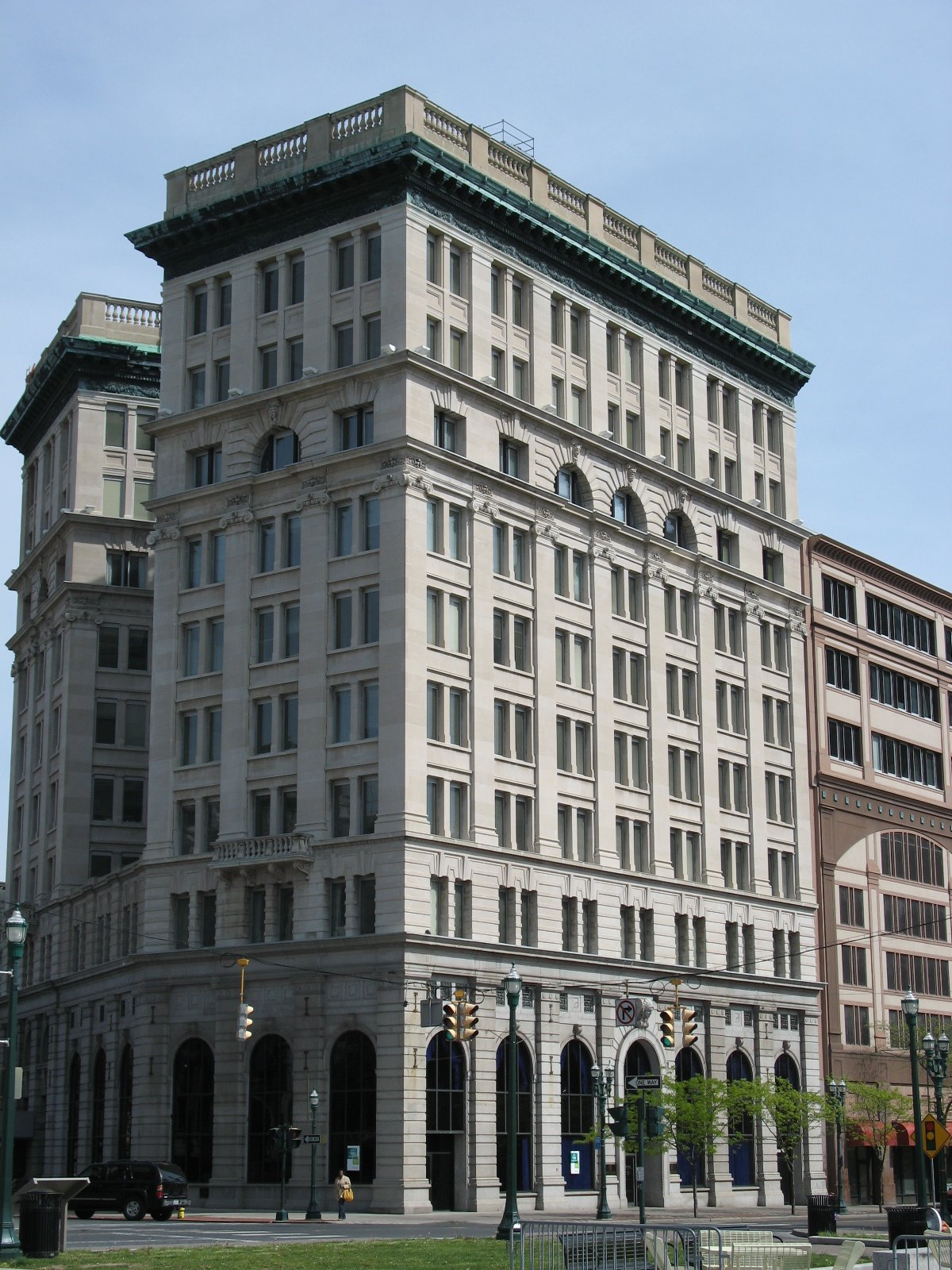

- Location within New York Location within the United States
- Location: 113 South Salina Street, Syracuse, New York
- Coordinates: 43°3′1″N 76°9′6.69″W
- Built: 1897
- Part of: Hanover Square Historic District (ID76001258)
- Added to NRHP: June 22, 1976

The Onondaga County Savings Bank was chartered in 1855 in Syracuse, New York. It was a franchise ahead of its time and had four separate branches by the late 19th century. The Onondaga County Savings Bank Building was constructed in 1897 adjacent to the Erie Canal in Clinton Square.

In 1968, the bank shortened its name to Onondaga Savings Bank and in 1987 it changed again to OnBank.

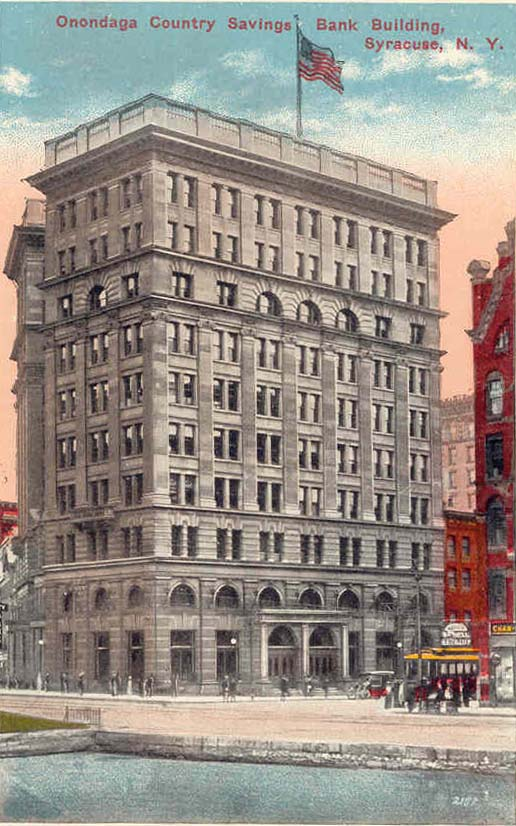
Onondaga County Savings Bank Building about 1900 - On the banks of the Erie Canal in Syracuse, New York
