= Mexico (village), New York =

Town in New York, United States

Mexico, New York
- Village
- logo

- Location in Oswego County and the state of New York.
- Coordinates: 43°27′51″N 76°14′5″W
- Country: United States
- State: New York
- County: Oswego

Government
  - Mayor: Terry Grimshaw

Area
  - Total: 2.14 sq mi (5.55 km^{2})
  - Land: 2.14 sq mi (5.55 km^{2})
  - Water: 0 sq mi (0.00 km^{2})
- Elevation: 410 ft (125 m)

Population (2020)
  - Total: 1,531
  - Density: 713.9/sq mi (275.62/km^{2})
- Time zone: UTC-5 (Eastern (EST))
  - Summer (DST): UTC-4 (EDT)
- ZIP code: 13114
- Area code: 315
- FIPS code: 36-46811
- GNIS feature ID: 0957047
- Website: Village & Town

Mexico is a village located in the town of the same name in Oswego County, New York, United States. The population was 1,531 at the 2020 census. The village is located along New York State routes 3, 69, and 104.

== History ==
The first Mexico (a proposed county), with all the surrounding towns, was originally created from the town of Whitestown, Herkimer County, New York, on April 10, 1792, by the state land commissioner. It was to include present-day Oswego and Jefferson counties. The original organization of the proposed Mexico County and a town of that name was abandoned for a time. In December 1794, George Ludwig Christian Scriba purchased and patented a large tract of land; subsequently becoming a second Mexico, hence the village and town of Mexico.

George Scriba also later opened roads traveling from Mexico Bay and Mexico Point from what is now Mexico Point State Park to present-day Constantia, as well as a highway to present-day Oswego.

Settlers grew quickly in both the town and village of Mexico. The presence of roads, log cabins, frame houses, and businesses encouraged growth. Mexico's early businesses included saw mills, oil-mills, gristmills, asheries, tanneries, blacksmiths, tinsmiths, coopers, cheese plants, cloth-dressings, distilleries, shoe-shops, hotels, general merchandise, and jewelers.

Lewis Miller invented the spring wagon and the high quality of these wagons made them famous all over the county.

Lulu Brown began making pans of baked beans to sell in grocery stores in 1937. They sold so well that her husband Earl and her son Robert E. Brown decided to sell them in Oswego. The business grew and relocated to the second story of the building at the south east corner of South Jefferson and Main Streets. Earl Brown died in 1938 and shortly after Richard G. Whitney joined the firm, forming Brown-Whitney-Brown (BWB). The business has since evolved into the world-famous Grandma Brown's Baked Beans.

With growth, disease was prevalent. Between 1812 and 1820 a cholera-like disease spread throughout the region, a fatal form of dysentery, as well as ague and bilious fevers. More than one-half of the settlers died of these scourges during the first 20 years of the settlement.

In 1813 a system of public schools was established with 14 districts. The number increased to 19 by 1895 as new settlements developed. In 1822 a two-story brick school housing grades on the first floor and high school on the second. This was called "the Academy" and was admitted to the state system by the regents in 1833. Mexico was the first school of secondary education to be founded in what is now Oswego County. Mexico was the first school to centralize in Oswego county. This occurred in 1936 when 31 districts in the towns of Mexico, Palermo and New Haven closed to make Mexico Academy and Central School. An elementary school continued in New Haven and Palermo while the rest of the students were bussed to Mexico.

Mexico also played its part in the abolition of slavery. As early as 1835 citizens signed petitions which were sent to Washington requesting the abolishment of slavery. Asa Wing was a prominent speaker who traveled across the state urging voters to pressure their representatives to pass new laws prohibiting ownership of slaves. Starr Clark was leader in the Underground Railroad and was the station master of the area.

The historic core of the village was listed on the National Register of Historic Places in 1983 as the Mexico Village Historic District. Also listed are the Mexico Octagon Barn, Mexico Railroad Depot, Hamilton Farmstead, Mexico Academy and Central School, Starr Clark Tin Shop, Peter Chandler House, Orson Ames House, Leonard Ames Farmhouse, Leonard Ames Farmhouse, Phineas Davis Farmstead, Thayer Farmstead, and Timothy Skinner House. The Mexico Stone Store was added in 2010.

== Geography ==
Mexico is located at 43°27′51″N 76°14′4″W (43.464173, -76.234643).

According to the United States Census Bureau, the village has a total area of 2.1 square miles (5.5 km^{2}), all land.

== Demographics ==
Historical population
Census	Pop.	Note	%±
1870	1,204		—
1880	1,273		5.7%
1890	1,315		3.3%
1900	1,249		−5.0%
1910	1,233		−1.3%
1920	1,336		8.4%
1930	1,297		−2.9%
1940	1,348		3.9%
1950	1,398		3.7%
1960	1,465		4.8%
1970	1,555		6.1%
1980	1,621		4.2%
1990	1,555		−4.1%
2000	1,572		1.1%
2010	1,624		3.3%
2020	1,531		−5.7%
U.S. Decennial Census

As of the census of 2000, there were 1,572 people, 652 households, and 427 families residing in the village. The population density was 735.1 inhabitants per square mile (283.8/km^{2}). There were 721 housing units at an average density of 337.1 per square mile (130.2/km^{2}). The racial makeup of the village was 98.28% White, 0.19% Black or African American, 0.32% Native American, 0.19% Asian, 0.06% Pacific Islander, 0.13% from other races, and 0.83% from two or more races. Hispanic or Latino of any race were 0.57% of the population.

There were 652 households, out of which 36.3% had children under the age of 18 living with them, 48.5% were married couples living together, 13.3% had a female householder with no husband present, and 34.4% were non-families. 29.8% of all households were made up of individuals, and 14.6% had someone living alone who was 65 years of age or older. The average household size was 2.41 and the average family size was 2.98.

In the village, the population was spread out, with 27.6% under the age of 18, 7.4% from 18 to 24, 27.6% from 25 to 44, 24.2% from 45 to 64, and 13.2% who were 65 years of age or older. The median age was 36 years. For every 100 females, there were 87 males. For every 100 females age 18 and under, there were 83 males.

The median income for a household in the village was $35,761, and the median income for a family was $41,696. Males had a median income of $39,306 versus $23,875 for females. The per capita income for the village was $18,227. About 9.4% of families and 13.0% of the population were below the poverty line, including 14.3% of those under age 18 and 13.1% of those age 65 or over.
