= Mexico High School =

Mexico High School may refer to:

- Mexico High School, Mexico, Maine, which merged into the Mountain Valley High School
- Mexico Senior High School, Mexico, Missouri
- Mexico High School (New York), Mexico, New York
