= Orson Ames House =

Historic house in New York, United States

- U.S. National Register of Historic Places
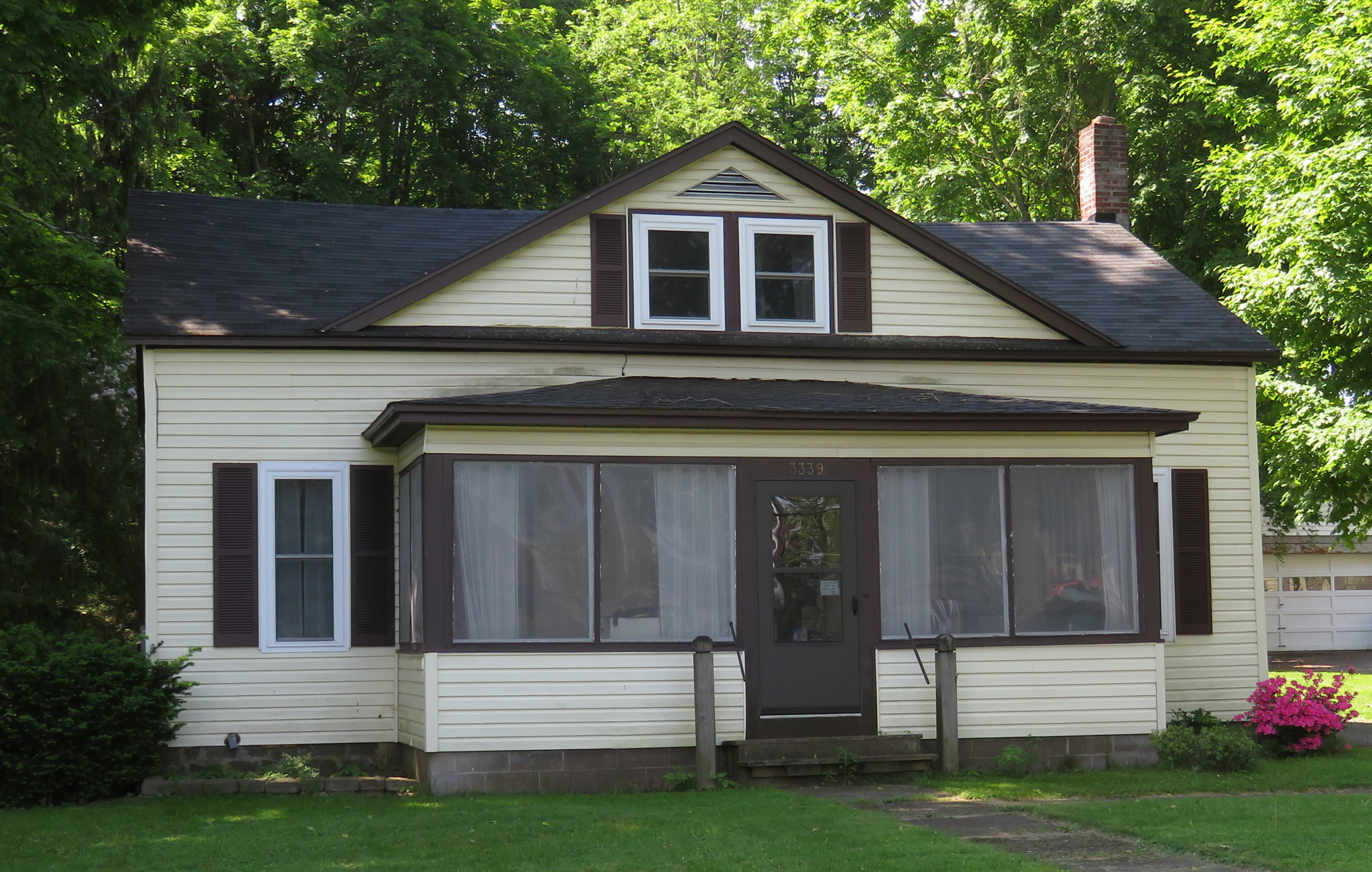

- Location within New York Location within the United States
- Location: 3339 Main St. Mexico, New York
- Coordinates: 43°27′35″N 76°14′7″W
- Area: less than one acre
- Built: 1935
- Architectural style: Mid 19th Century Revival
- MPS: Freedom Trail, Abolitionism, and African American Life in Central New York MPS
- NRHP reference No.: 01001318
- Added to NRHP: December 4, 2001

The Orson Ames House is a historic house located at 3339 Main Street in Mexico, New York.

== Description and history ==
It was built in about 1830, and is a single-story frame structure with a heavy timber post and beam frame and plank walls. The main block is 36 feet wide and 24 feet deep. A major alteration occurred about 1930 and the kitchen was rebuilt in 1960. In 1851, Orson Ames sheltered at the home the famous fugitive slave William "Jerry" Henry.

It was listed on the National Register of Historic Places on December 4, 2001.
