= Soldiers and Sailors Monument (Syracuse, New York) =

Coordinates: 43°03′04″N 76°09′10″W

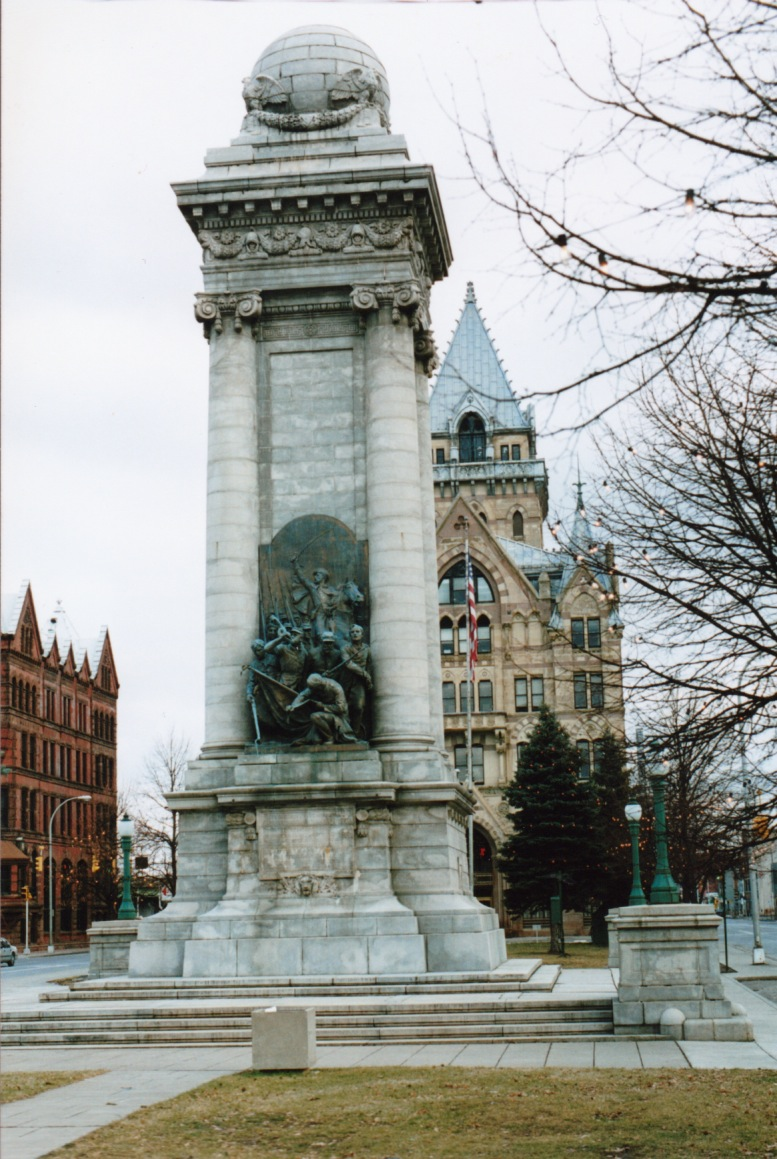
Monument, from the west. Syracuse Savings Bank Building (1875) is behind it.

Soldiers and Sailors Monument (1908–1911) is a Beaux-Arts monument in Syracuse, New York, dedicated to the 12,265 men of Onondaga County who served in the Civil War. It was designed by architect Clarence Blackall and includes two bronze sculptures, The Call to Arms and An Incident at Gettysburg by Cyrus Dallin. The memorial was erected in Clinton Square, alongside the Erie Canal.

The monument consists of a square granite pylon with attached Roman Ionic columns at its corners, supporting a heavy cornice with a carved frieze, and crowned by a globe guarded by four eagles grasping a thick garland. This is set atop a plinth, and a stepped plaza with corner piers supporting bronze lampposts. The pylon's east and west sides are adorned with bronze high-relief sculpture groups by Dallin. The north and south sides feature granite reliefs of flags and military accoutrements. The plinth features dedication plaques, and a quotation from President Abraham Lincoln's Gettysburg Address. The monument is approximately 75 ft (22.86 m) tall.

Dallin won a design competition to produce the two monumental bronze groups, The Call to Arms and An Incident at Gettysburg. The competition's judges included J. Q. A. Ward and Daniel Chester French. The Incident at Gettysburg group depicts the moment when a Syracuse native, Color Sergeant William C. Lilly of the 149th New York Infantry, paused in the middle of a firefight to repair a broken flagstaff with his belt. Lilly survived Gettysburg but was killed in a later engagement in the War.

The monument's cornerstone was laid on Memorial Day, May 31, 1909. It was dedicated on June 21, 1910, although only Dallin’s The Call to Arms had been installed. Dallin's assistant, Frederick MacMonnies, had been sent to France to attend to the other sculpture group's casting in bronze, but instead got married and went off on his honeymoon. The Incident at Gettysburg was dedicated on June 23, 1911.

The Syracuse section of the Erie Canal was filled in and paved over in 1925, to create Erie Boulevard. The monument's original granite plaza measured 50 ft (15.24 m) by 150 ft (45.72 m), but the sections east and west of its central portion were removed in the 1930s, and replaced by landscaping. A reflecting pool that traces the canal's former path was constructed alongside the monument in 2001. It features fountain jets in warm weather and becomes an iceskating rink in winter.

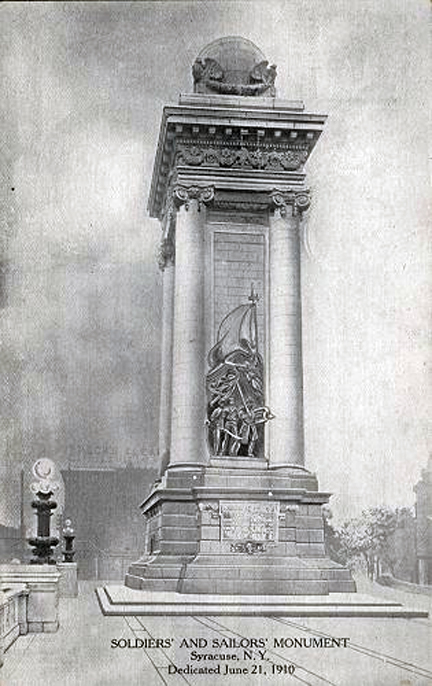
The monument in a 1910 postcard.

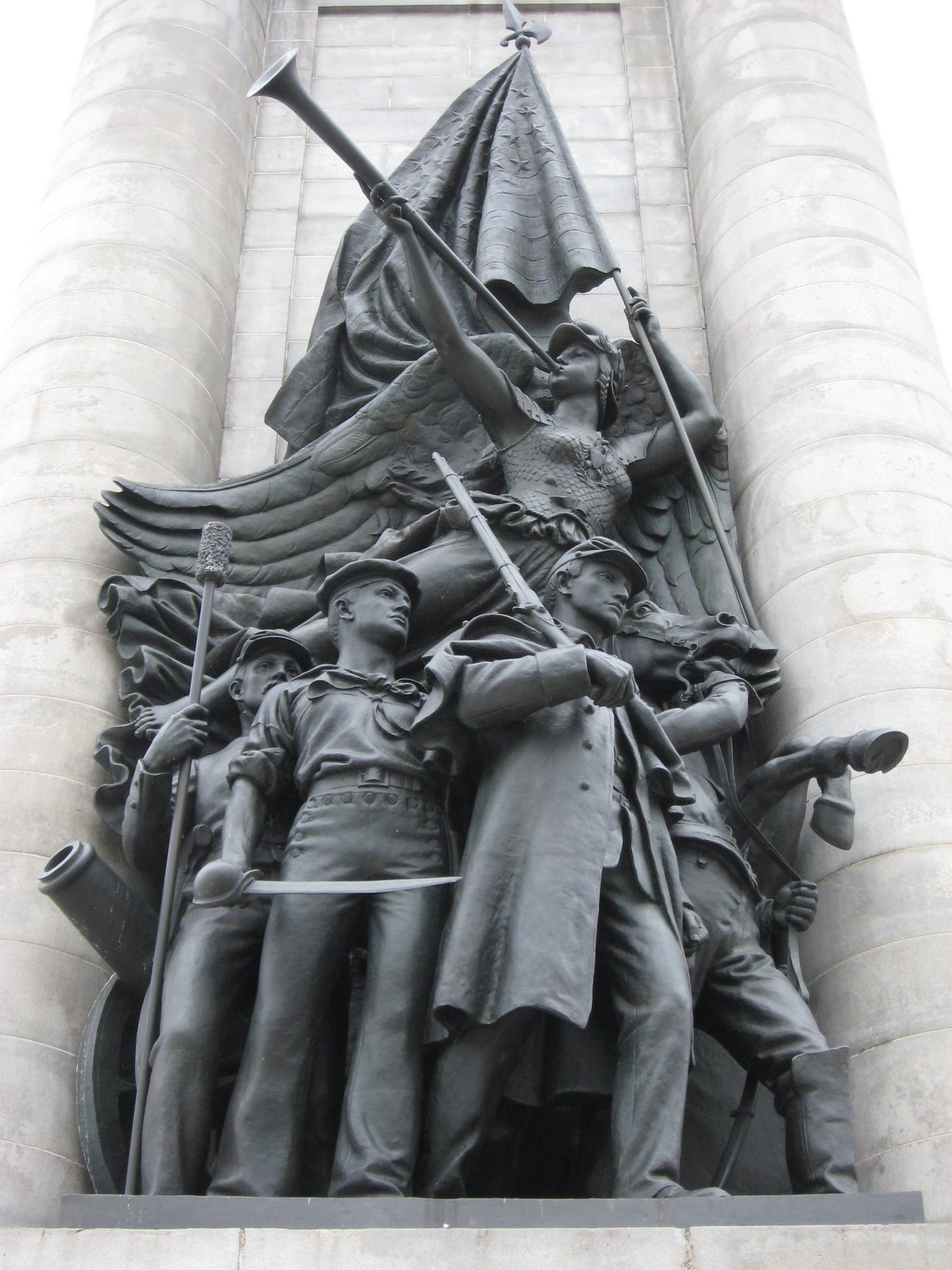
The Call to Arms by Cyrus Dallin

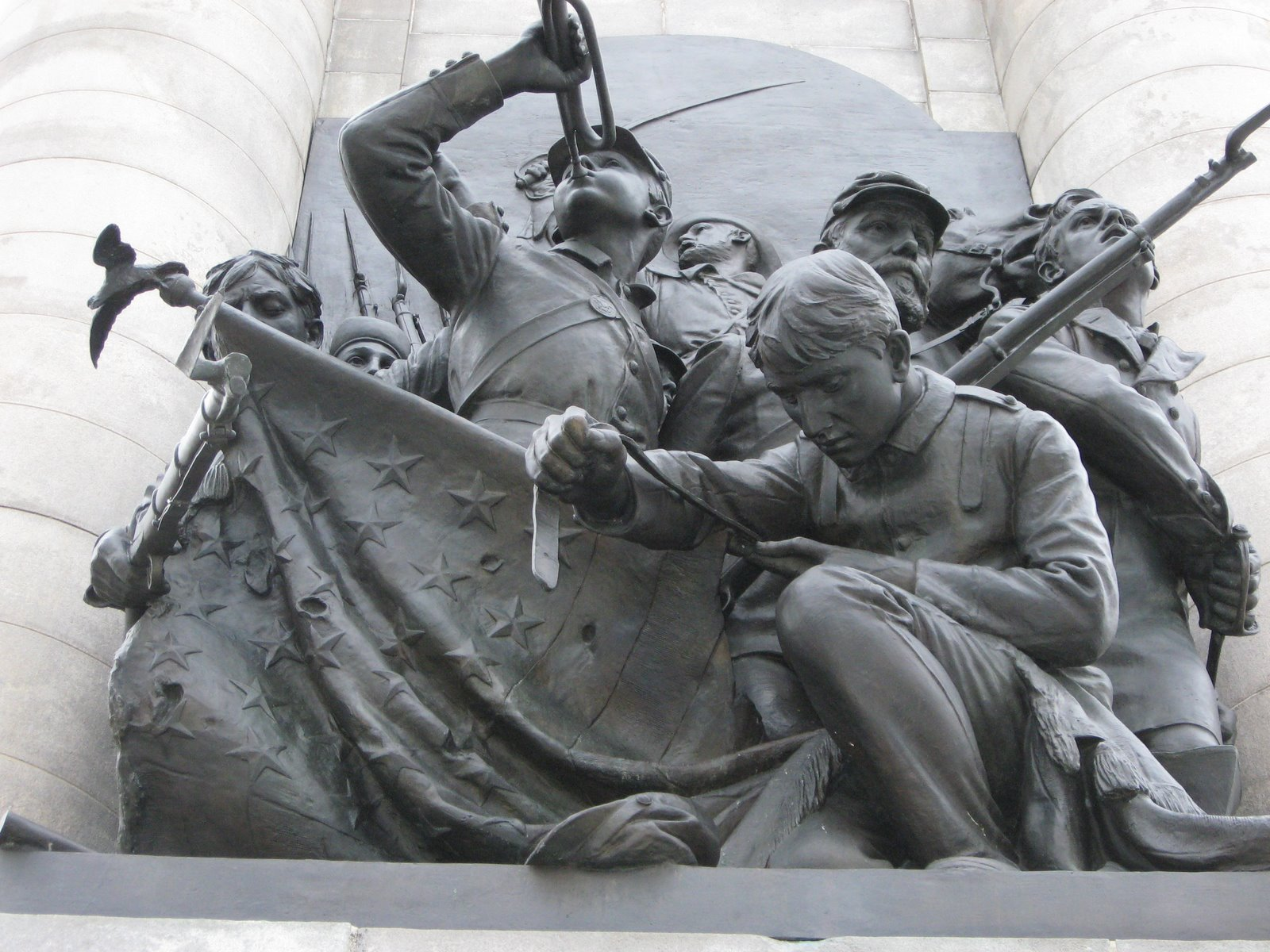
An Incident at Gettysburg by Dallin

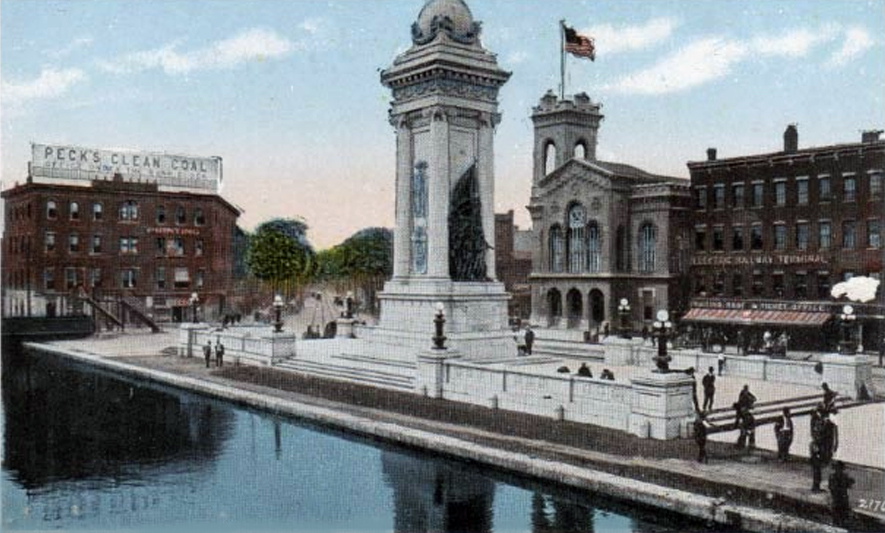
The monument (with original plaza) and Erie Canal in a 1917 postcard.

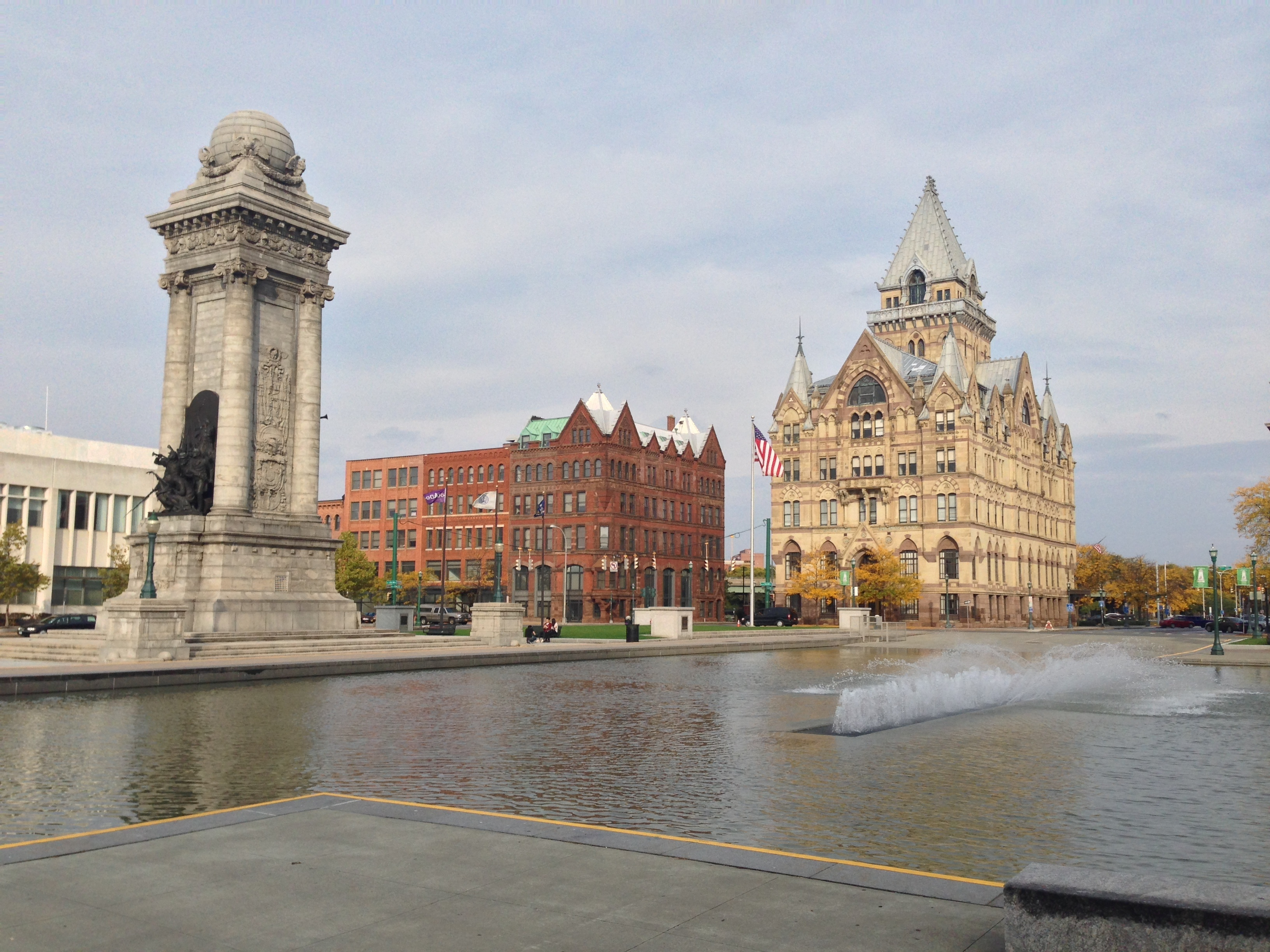
The monument and reflecting pool, 2013
