= Mexico station =

Mexico

General information
- Location: 5530 Scenic Avenue, Mexico, Oswego County, New York 13114

History
- Opened: January 4, 1866
- Closed: August 15, 1958

Former services
Preceding station	New York Central Railroad	Following station
New Haven toward Oswego	Oswego – Rome	Pulaski toward Rome
- Mexico Railroad Depot
- U.S. National Register of Historic Places
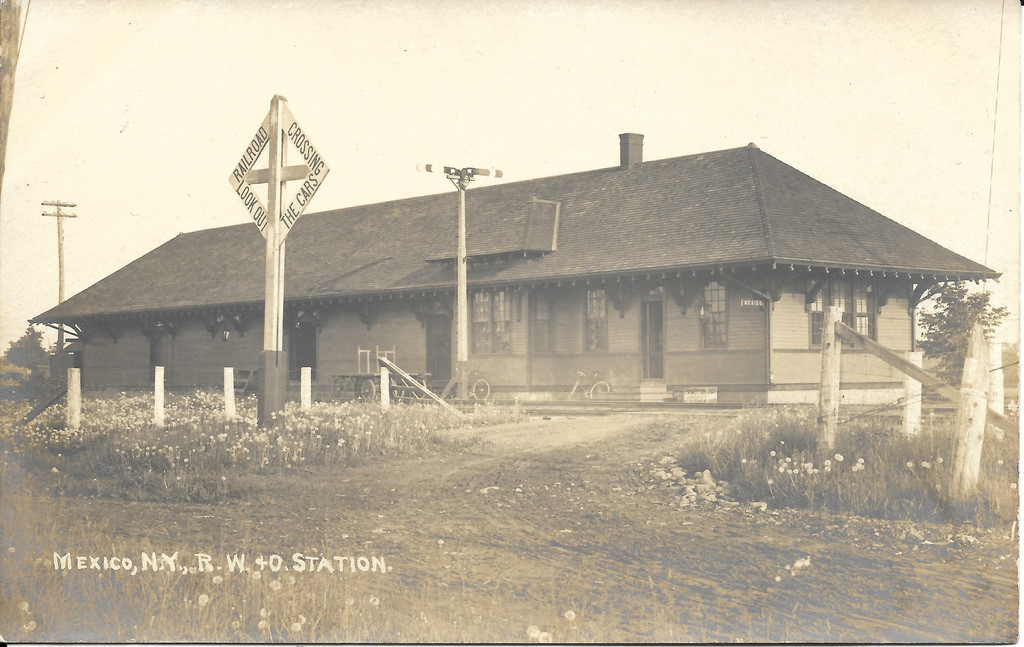

- Location within New York Location within the United States
- Location: 5530 Scenic Ave. Mexico, New York
- Coordinates: 43°28′9″N 76°13′57″W
- Area: 2 acres (0.81 ha)
- Built: 1905
- Architectural style: Stick/Eastlake
- MPS: Mexico MPS
- NRHP reference No.: 91000523
- Added to NRHP: June 20, 1991
Location

Mexico station is a historic railway depot located at Mexico in Oswego County, New York. It was built in 1905 by the Oswego and Rome Railroad. It is a one-story, Stick style, wood-frame building, 40 feet by 100 feet in size. It has a broad hip roof with a wide overhang. Also on the property is a two stall privy. It was last used as a railroad depot in 1940.

It was listed on the National Register of Historic Places in 2002 as Mexico Railroad Depot.
