= Timothy Skinner House =

Historic house in New York, United States

- U.S. National Register of Historic Places
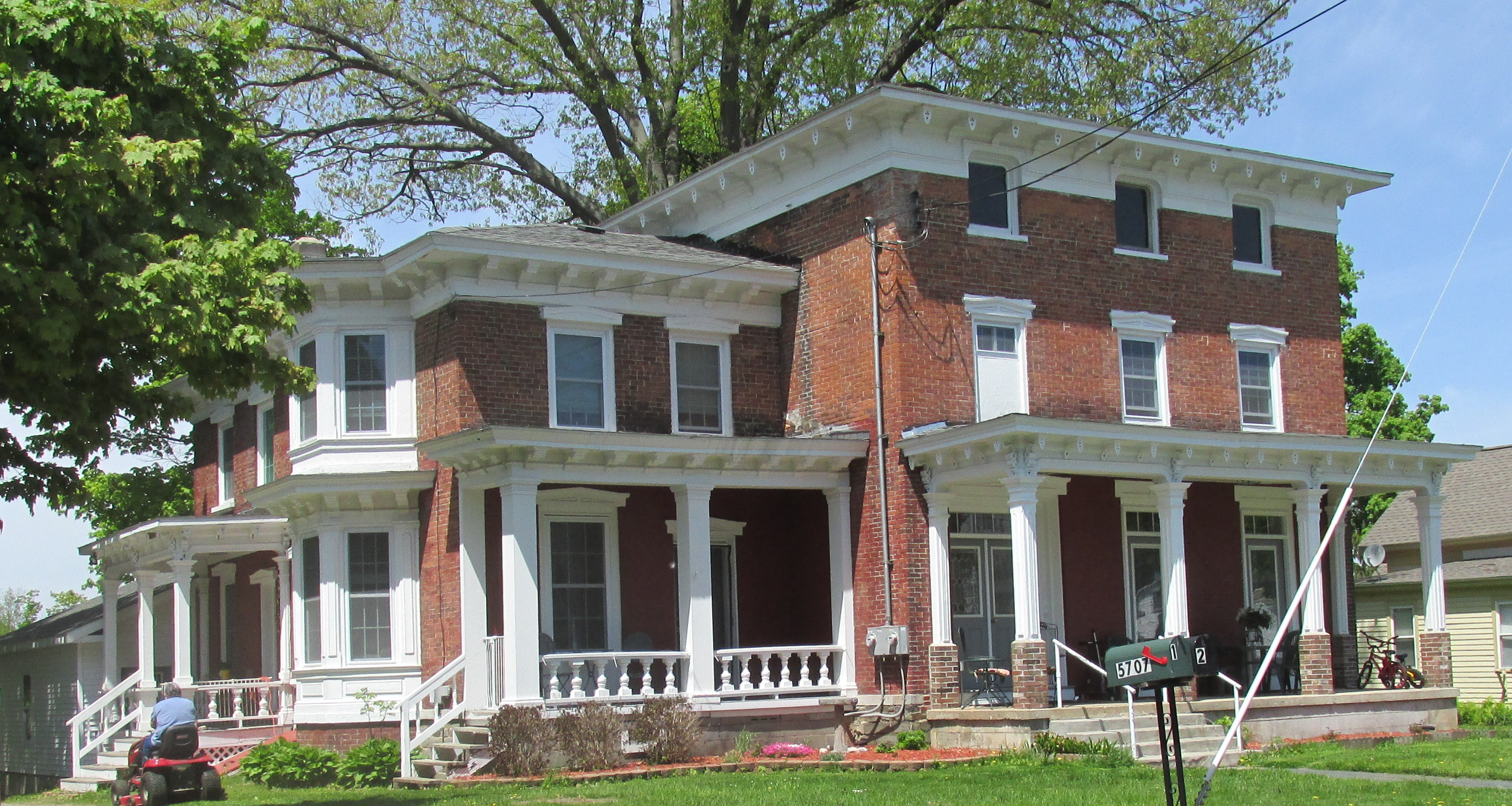

- Location within New York Location within the United States
- Location: 5355 Scenic Ave. Mexico, New York
- Coordinates: 43°27′40″N 76°13′57″W
- Area: less than one acre
- Built: 1865
- Architectural style: Italianate
- MPS: Mexico MPS
- NRHP reference No.: 91000526
- Added to NRHP: June 20, 1991

Timothy Skinner House is a historic home located at Mexico in Oswego County, New York. It is a large, Italianate style brick residence. The residence was built about 1869 and is composed of a 2 1/2-story, three-bay main block with a 2-story, two-bay recessed wing. The property was sold to the American Legion in 1964.

It was listed on the National Register of Historic Places in 1991.
