= Starr Clark Tin Shop =

Historic commercial building in New York, United States

- U.S. National Register of Historic Places
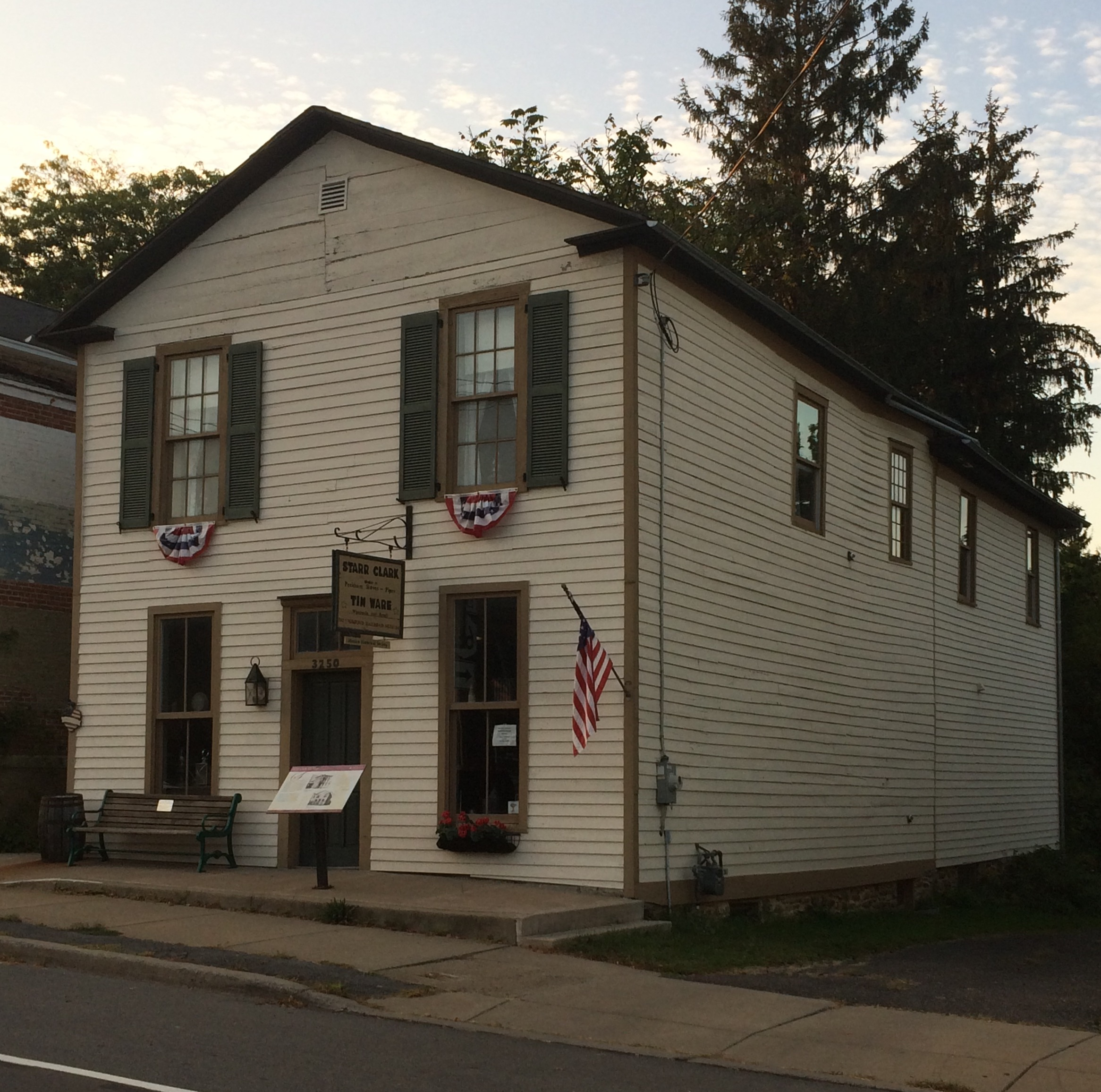
- Starr Clark Tin Shop, September 2017

- Location within New York Location within the United States
- Location: 3250 Main St., Mexico, New York
- Coordinates: 43°27′35″N 76°13′43″W
- Area: less than one acre
- Built: 1838
- MPS: Freedom Trail, Abolitionism, and African American Life in Central New York MPS
- NRHP reference No.: 01001323
- Added to NRHP: December 04, 2001

Starr Clark Tin Shop is a historic commercial building located at Mexico in Oswego County, New York. It is a two-story wood-framed vernacular building built about 1827 with Federal details. The tin shop measures 24 feet 4 inches (7.42 m) wide and 32 feet (9.8 m) deep, with a 24-foot-4-inch-wide by 25-foot-8-inch-deep (7.42 m by 7.82 m) rear wing. Its owner, Starr Clark, was a widely recognized abolitionist and supporter of the Underground Railroad.

It was listed on the National Register of Historic Places in 1982.

The Mexico Historical Society has restored the shop and operates it as a museum that highlights its use as a working tin shop and as a hub for the abolition movement.
