= Hamilton Farmstead =

- U.S. National Register of Historic Places
- U.S. Historic district
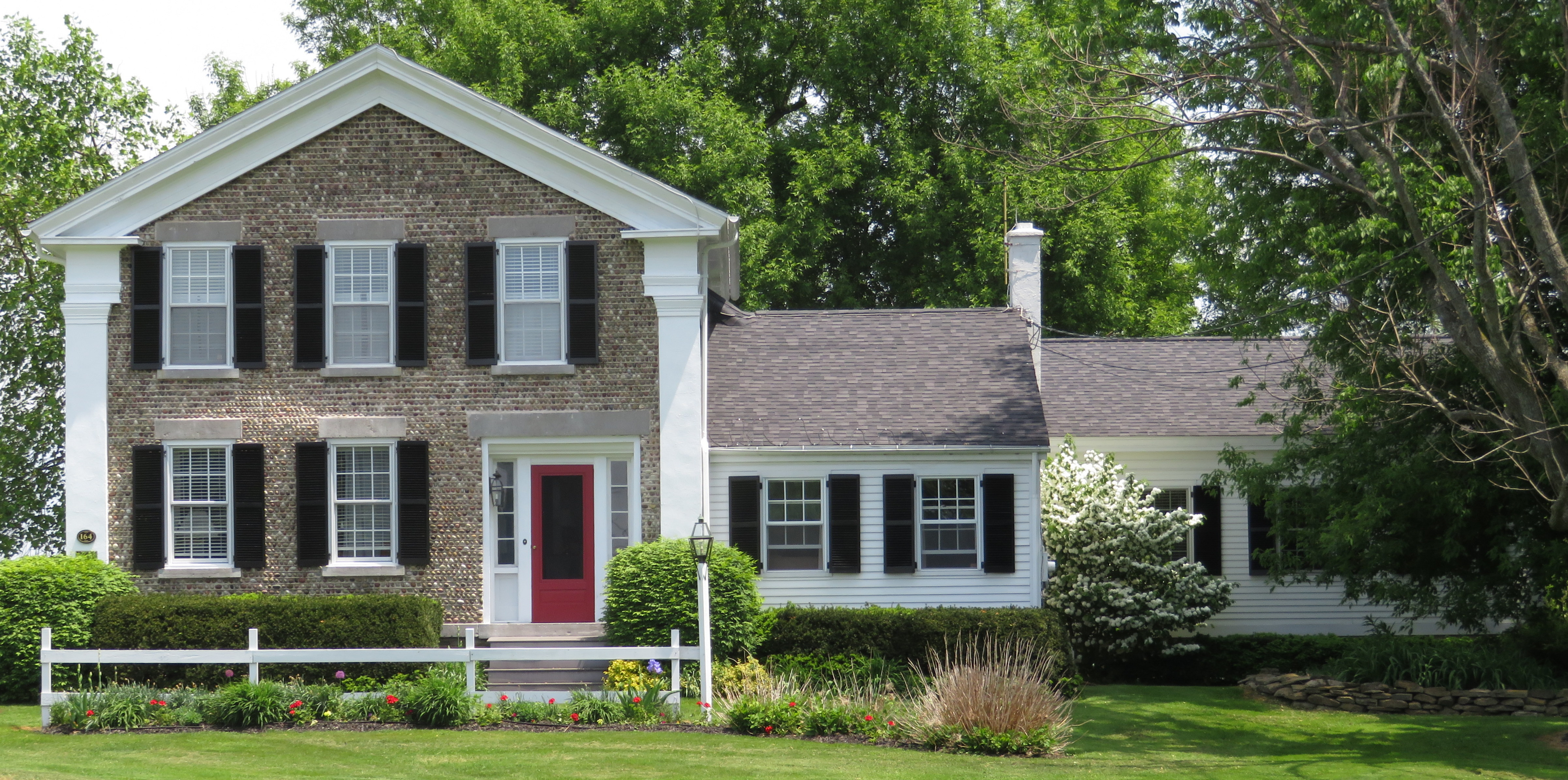
- Farmhouse (1848)

- Location within New York Location within the United States
- Location: 5644 Hamilton St. Mexico, New York
- Coordinates: 43°28′30″N 76°13′52″W
- Area: 15 acres (6.1 ha)
- Built: 1848
- Architect: David Wilcox
- Architectural style: Greek Revival
- MPS: Mexico MPS
- NRHP reference No.: 91001657
- Added to NRHP: November 18, 1991

Hamilton Farmstead is a historic farm complex and national historic district located at Mexico in Oswego County, New York. The district includes three contributing structures; the farmhouse, a barn, and a milkhouse; and three hand-dug wells. The farmhouse is a three bay, two story cobblestone building built in 1848 in the Greek Revival style.

It was listed on the National Register of Historic Places in 1991.
