= Leonard Ames Farmhouse =

Historic house in New York, United States

- U.S. National Register of Historic Places
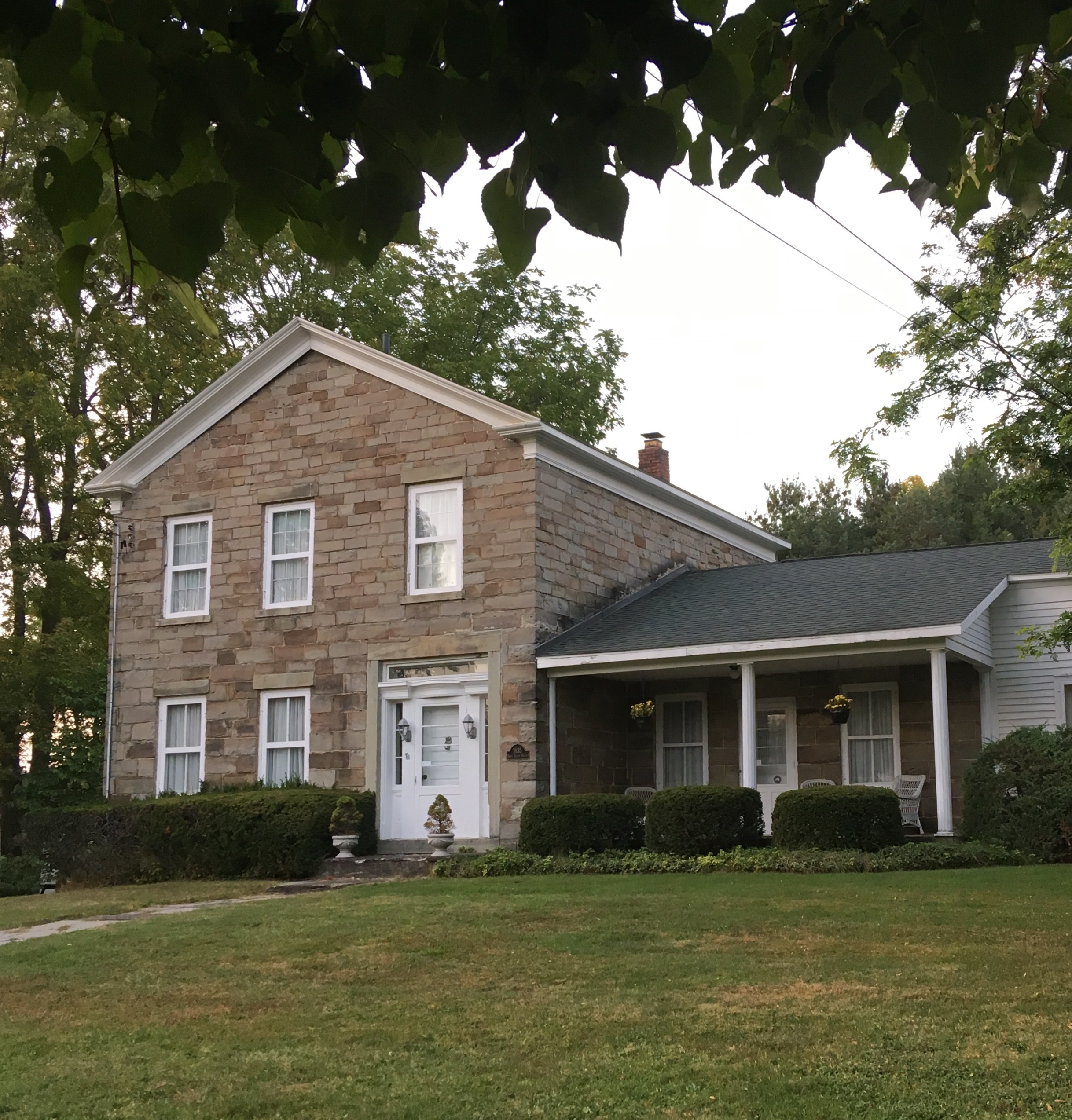

- Location within New York Location within the United States
- Location: 5707 Main St., Mexico, New York
- Coordinates: 43°27′38″N 76°14′30″W
- Area: less than one acre
- Built: 1815
- Architectural style: Federal
- MPS: Mexico MPS
- NRHP reference No.: 91001630
- Added to NRHP: November 14, 1991

Leonard Ames Farmhouse is a historic home located at Mexico in Oswego County, New York. It is a large, Federal-style residence. The first section is a small 1 1/2-story structure built about 1815. It was enlarged by the addition of a large 2-story stone residence and with a 1 1/2-story wing built in 1835.

It was listed on the National Register of Historic Places in 1991.
