= Mexico High School (New York) =

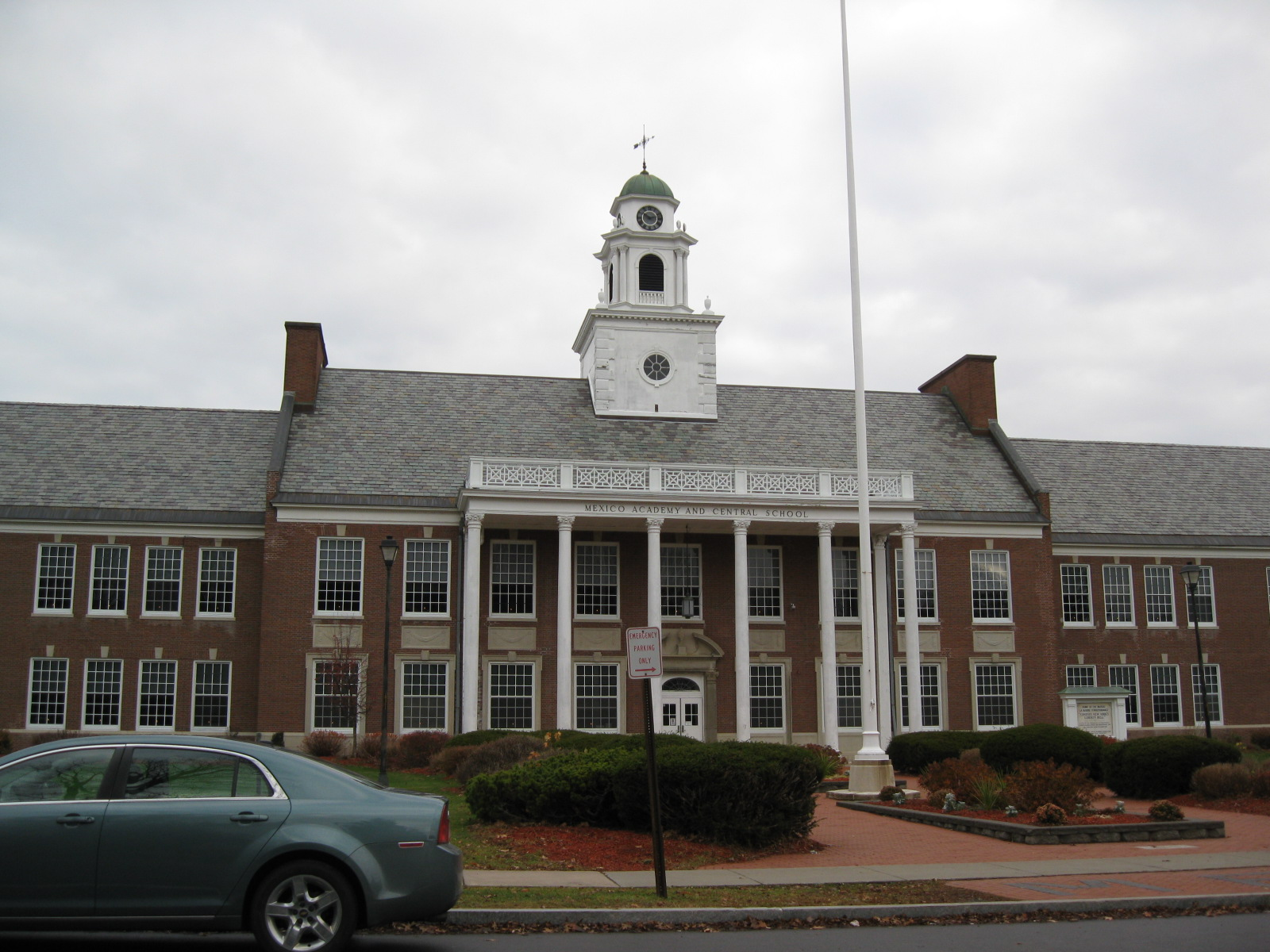

Location
- 3338 Main St; Mexico, New York 13114; United States; 43.4603°N 76.2346°W

Information
- Type: Public
- Established: 1826
- School district: Mexico Central School District
- NCES School ID: 361917001732
- Principal: Donald A. Root
- Teaching staff: 47.50 (on an FTE basis)
- Grades: 9-12
- Enrollment: 579 (2021-2022)
- Student to teacher ratio: 12.19
- Campus: Rural: Distant
- Colors: Black and Orange
- Mascot: Tigers
- Newspaper: The Talkative
- Yearbook: The Mexiconian
- Website: www.mexicocsd.org/mexico-high-school
- Mexico Academy and Central School
- U.S. National Register of Historic Places
- Area: 7 acres (2.8 ha)
- Built: 1938
- Architect: Harold O. Fullerton
- Architectural style: Colonial Revival, Georgian Revival
- MPS: Mexico MPS
- NRHP reference No.: 91001633
- Added to NRHP: November 14, 1991

Mexico High School is a historic school building located in Mexico, Oswego County, New York. It is part of the Mexico Central School District. It was built in 1938 after a previous 1927 building was damaged by fire in 1937. It is a two-story, Georgian Revival style brick building in a U-shaped plan. It features a distinctive tower that contains an 1828 bell from an earlier building. The entry is distinguished by a two-story, five-bay portico supported by six Ionic columns and crowned by a Chippendale patterned balustrade.

It was listed on the National Register of Historic Places as the Mexico Academy and Central School in 1991.

== Notable people ==
- Lil Beej: American Rapper
- Cripwqlk PDSJ: American Rapper
