= Mexico Village Historic District =

Historic district in New York, United States

- U.S. National Register of Historic Places
- U.S. Historic district
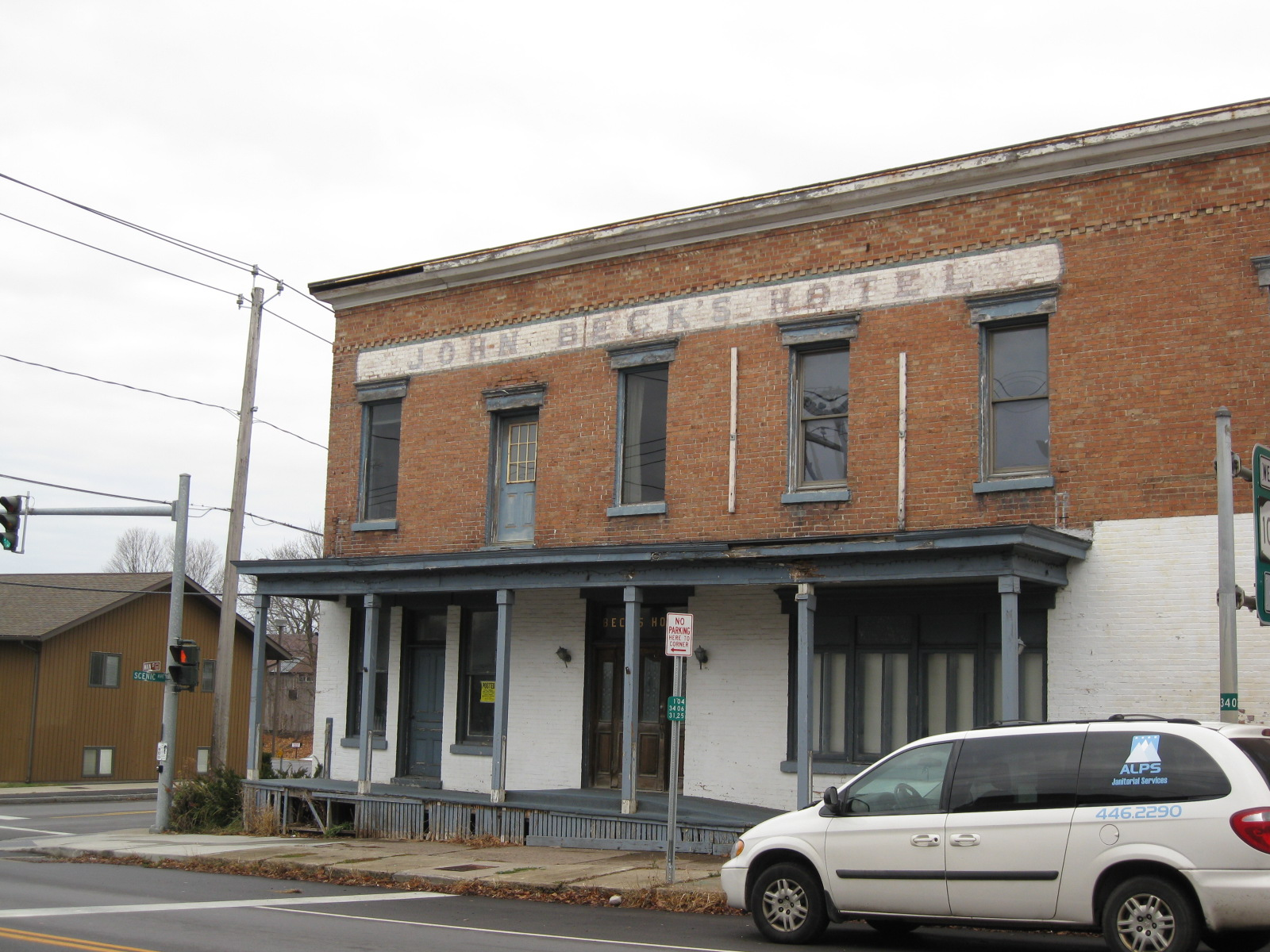
- Becks Hotel, Mexico Village Historic District, November 2009

- Location within New York Location within the United States
- Location: Main, Jefferson, Church and Spring Sts., Mexico, New York
- Coordinates: 43°27′29″N 76°13′46″W
- Area: 18 acres (7.3 ha)
- Architect: Multiple
- Architectural style: Greek Revival, Italianate
- MPS: Mexico MPS
- NRHP reference No.: 91000528
- Added to NRHP: June 20, 1991

Mexico Village Historic District is a national historic district located at Mexico in Oswego County, New York. The district includes 77 contributing buildings and three contributing structures. There are 33 residential buildings, 23 commercial buildings, and 17 outbuildings. It includes the central part of the built-up area of the small rural village of Mexico. Beck's Hotel (1897) is the largest building in the district.

It was listed on the National Register of Historic Places in 1991.
