= Clinton Square =

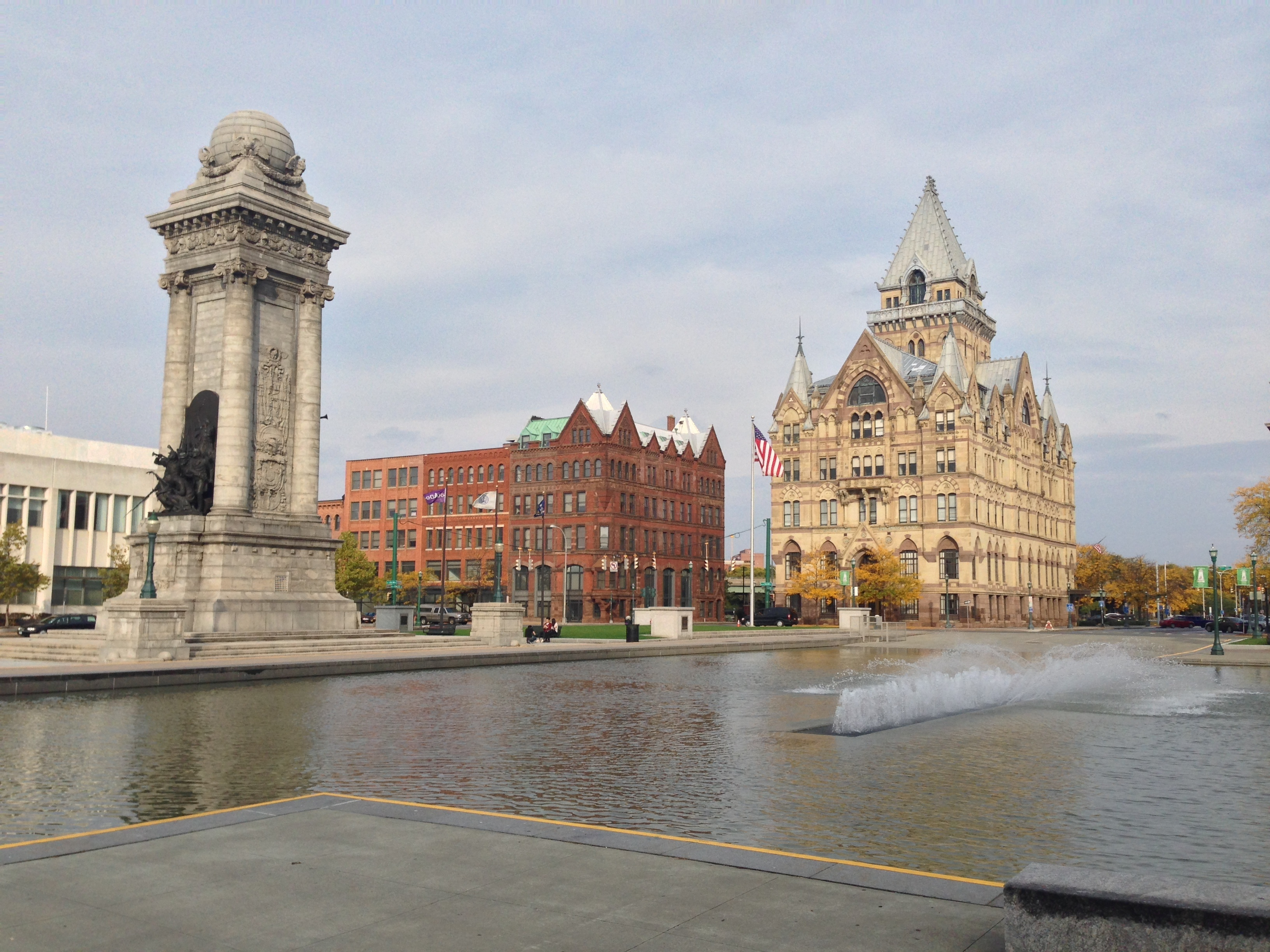
- Clinton Square in 2013

- Location within New York
- 43°3′3″N 76°9′10″W
- Location: Syracuse, New York, US

History
- Established: 1800

Site notes
- Area: .553 acres (0.00224 km^{2})
- Governing body: City of Syracuse

Clinton Square is a public square in downtown Syracuse, New York, United States, that has served a gathering place since the earliest days of the city. The square was the original town center and first came into existence in the early 19th century as the crossroads of two major roadways. With the construction of the Erie Canal through the square in the 1820s, the intersection was further transformed. During the 19th century, the square was a marketplace and hosted various public events, including an 1870 public barbecue reportedly attended by 20,000 people.

As a busy intersection, the square hosted several large hotels and other historic buildings. The Soldiers and Sailors Monument was dedicated in the square in 1911. In 1917 the Canal was closed and filled in. In the decades that followed, Clinton Square was redeveloped into a park that holds various annual festivals. Since the 1990s, the square has held an ice skating rink in the winter. A major 2001 redevelopment project saw a larger fountain implemented. Clinton Square is also the site of Syracuse's municipal Christmas tree and menorah during the holiday season. In the modern era, the square has hosted a number of festivals, beginning with the 1991 Jazz Fest.

== Description ==
Clinton Square holds a large fountain, the Soldiers and Sailors Monument, a monument to the Jerry Rescue, and an information kiosk. The square is near Hanover Square. The Soldiers and Sailors Monument was dedicated in 1911. The monument consists of a square granite pylon with attached Roman Ionic columns at its corners, crowned by a globe supported by four eagles. This is set atop a plinth, and a stepped plaza with corner piers supporting bronze lampposts. All four sides of the monument have different sculptures on it. The monument is approximately 75 ft (22.86 m) tall. The Jerry Rescue Monument depicts Jerry, a recently freed slave, in broken chains, being aided by Jermain Wesley Loguen and Samuel Joseph May. It was dedicated in 1990.

=== Historic buildings ===
The buildings around the square have historically been prominent in Syracuse. However, many have burnt down, with fires in 1834, 1856, 1881, 1896, and 1943. The 1881 fire consumed the Wieting Opera House, which The New York Times described as "one of the finest structures here [in Syracuse], and containing one of the handsomest theatres in the State". The Empire House hotel burnt down in 1943. Other relatively well-known buildings that have been taken down in the square's vicinity include the Clinton Block, Hotel Clover, and Goettel's laundry. The police quarters were replaced by a newspaper building.

Clinton Square is surrounded by four bank buildings: the Gridley Building (1867), the Syracuse Savings Bank Building (1875), the Third National Bank Building (1886), and the Onondaga County Savings Bank Building (1897). The area to the north of the square is occupied by the Syracuse Newspapers Building (1971), which replaced the third Onondaga County Courthouse. It holds the offices of several presses.

== History ==
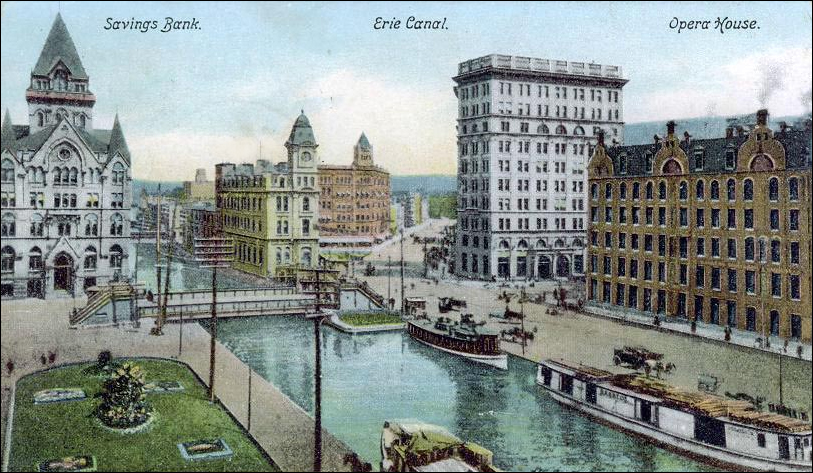
Clinton Square next to the Erie Canal c. 1905: Syracuse Savings Bank on left, Gridley Building in center and Wieting Opera House on far right - The tall building (center on right) is the Onondaga County Savings Bank

Clinton Square c. 1905.

Clinton Square's development is directly tied to the development of Syracuse as a city; the first lot sold was in the area. As it was at the intersection of Salina and Genesee Streets, the square was an early crossroads. From 1806 to 1844 the area around the intersection featured the Mansion House, an inn first known as the South Salina House and constructed by Henry Bogardus. The crossroads were initially known as Bogardus' Corners. Bogardus's building was purchased by Sterling Cossit in 1815; by this point it was a tavern, the city's first. Cossit, who took over operation of the Mansion House, lent his name to the corners and they were referred to as Cossits' Corners.

When Gilbert du Motier, Marquis de Lafayette, visited Syracuse, a reception for him was held in the square.

=== Erie Canal ===
The square grew in prominence as the Erie Canal passed through it. When the canal opened in 1825 it transformed the city. Three years later the Oswego Canal opened, passed through the Erie Canal near the square. It was renamed in honor of DeWitt Clinton, a governor of New York and prominent supporter of the canal, by Joshua Forman.

Clinton Square became a bustling marketplace, officially designated as such in 1837. A farmers' market was held in the square from 1837 to 1899. Clinton Square grew with Syracuse, and was described as the "hub of the city" and the "busiest place in town". An early 1820s brick hotel on the square, the Syracuse House, was the largest in the region. Charles Dickens visited it in 1869 and wrote of it as "the worst inn that ever was seen ... located in a most wonderful out-of-the-way place which looks as if it had begun to be built yesterday and were going to be knocked over with a nail or two tomorrow." In 1844 a large hotel, the Empire House, was constructed on land previously occupied by the Mansion House.

Clinton Square has hosted to various large gatherings. During the 1851 Jerry Rescue, a crowd in Clinton Square advocated for the freedom of a fugitive slave. They were spoken to by antislavery leaders including Samuel Ringgold Ward. In 1869 the Cardiff Giant was exhibited at a building on Clinton Square for several weeks. A feast in the square on New Years Day in 1870 was organized by the brewer John Greenway. Aimed at feeding poor inhabitants of the city, Greenway had invited the whole of Syracuse, at the time 43,000 people. Contemporary reports stated that most of the attendees were not actually poor, and included some living outside of the city who had taken a train in explicitly for the banquet. Attendance was reported to have been around 20,000 people, many of whom sat at a 100 feet (30 m) long table. (Note: Estimates of attendance were described as "guesswork", in 1971, The Post-Standard wrote that "every two-fisted drinking man" attended the barbecue, while in 2001 the Syracuse Herald American wrote that "[h]alf the city" had come.) Greenway reportedly supplied three oxen, 2,300 pounds (1,000 kg) of roast beef, 5,000 bread loaves, and 2,400 pounds (1,100 kg) of plum pudding in the form of 12 puddings. There was also live music.

Clinton Square also held celebrations after presidential elections and when wars ended, sometimes with fireworks set off. The square was officially re-designated from a marketplace to a park in 1899, and an oval flower garden was added to its center.

=== Early–mid 20th century ===
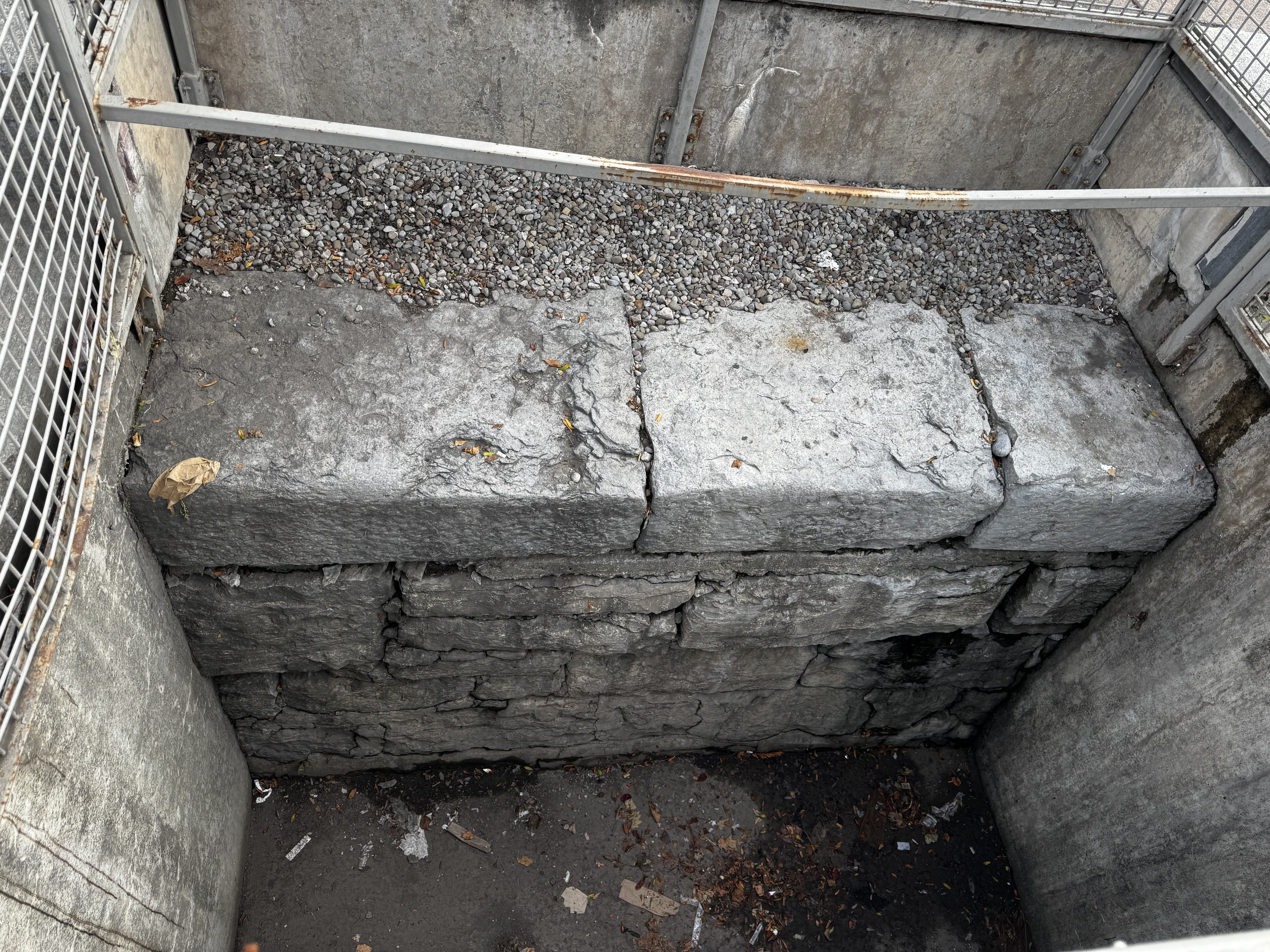
Stones of the Erie Canal in Clinton Square

Construction began on the Soldiers and Sailors Monument in the square in July 1909, in front of a crowd estimated at 50,000 people. It was dedicated in 1910 or 1911 in memory of Onondaga County citizens who died in the American Civil War. An estimated 110,000 people were present at the final dedication. The Erie Canal was closed in the city six years later. It was filled in and the bridge that spanned it was removed over the course of several years, reopening for traffic in October 1924. The Canal's path was replaced by Erie Boulevard, and much of the square replaced by a parking lot. Part of the parking lot was adapted into a park in the 1930s as part of a Works Progress Administration project.

Since 1933 Clinton Square has held Syracuse's municipal Christmas tree during the holiday season. It was lit on Christmas Eve until the 1960s, when the date was brought forward. The process of redevelopment continued with a redesign in the 1960s. However, this change also caused the square to have increased numbers of people who "seemed" homeless or were dealing drugs, according to Syracuse University professor R. Van Deusen Jr.

=== Later history and redevelopment ===
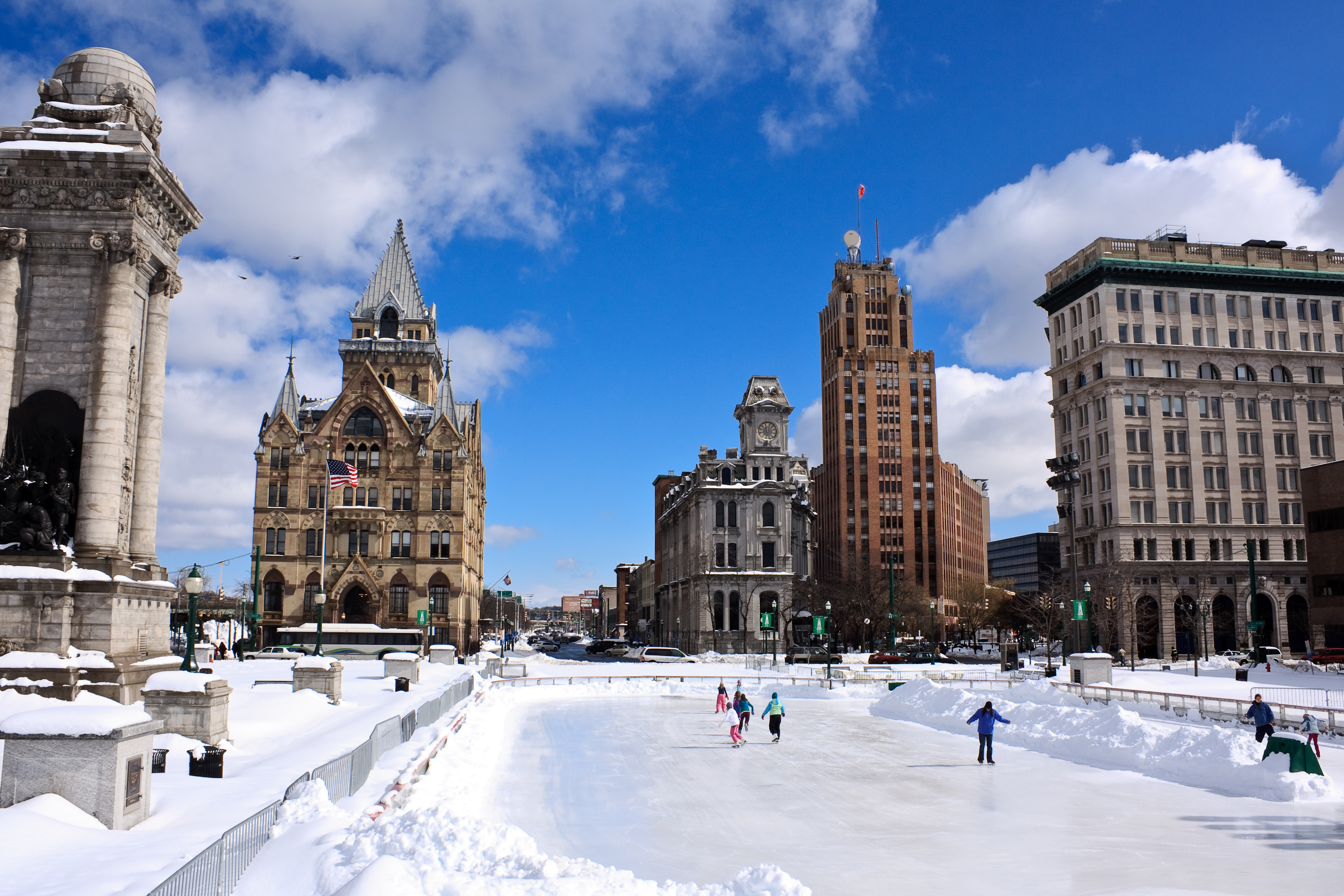
Clinton Square, with an ice skating rink in the center, during the winter.

Redevelopment work in 1981 led to the installation of two pyramid-shaped cascading fountains, partially made with bricks from the Erie Canal. Nine years later the Jerry Rescue Monument was dedicated in the square. In the 1990s Syracuse city leaders sought to repeat the success of developing Armory Square at Clinton Square, aiming to make the square an attractive location for business and real-estate development. At the time, the square hosted few businesses, namely The Post-Standard, banks, and an office building. Work began to redevelop the square in 2001, rerouting Erie Boulevard. The project also saw cleaning of the Soldiers and Sailors Monument and addition of an information kiosk. Trees that had been planted in the 1960s were removed. A 2002 analysis of the square's redevelopment published in GeoJournal described the neighborhood around Clinton Square as having undergone gentrification in the years leading up to the 2001 project, highlighting rules banning hot dog vendors and a movement to ban "alternative press street boxes".

Since 1990 the square has hosted an ice skating rink during the winter. In 1991 Syracuse's Jazz Fest was first held in the square, its first music festival. The Jazz Festival was the first major festival, and others have followed, including Oktoberfest, the Great Northeast Blues Fest, the New York State Rhythm and Blues Festival and Festa Italiana. In 2000, Ray Charles performed in the square for a crowd estimated at 35,000 people.

Syracuse's municipal Christmas tree lighting is traditionally a major event in the square; in 2001 the Syracuse Herald-American wrote that it attracted an average of 15,000 people when the weather was not inclement. Since 2013, Clinton Square has held Syracuse's municipal menorah in addition to the Christmas tree. The tree, traditionally sourced from a state forest, has been an artificial one since 2018. The 2020 ceremony was virtual.

In June 2026 a temporary roller rink was installed in the square.

== Sources ==
- Hardin, Evamaria (1993-02-01). Syracuse Landmarks: An AIA Guide to Downtown and Historic Neighborhoods. Syracuse University Press. pp. 85–88, 96. ISBN 978-0-8156-2599-5.
- Murphy, Angela (January 2004). ""It Outlaws me, and I Outlaw it!" Resistance to the Fugitive Slave Law in Syracuse, New York". Afro - Americans in New York Life and History. 28 (1): 1–36. ProQuest 200975255.
- Deusen, R. Van Jr. (2002). "Public space design as class warfare: Urban design, the 'right to the city' and the production of Clinton Square, Syracuse, NY". GeoJournal. 58 (2–3): 149–158. doi:10.1023/B:GEJO.0000010834.17907.5e. S2CID 189865890. ProQuest 223668513.
