= Peter Chandler House =

Historic house in New York, United States

- U.S. National Register of Historic Places
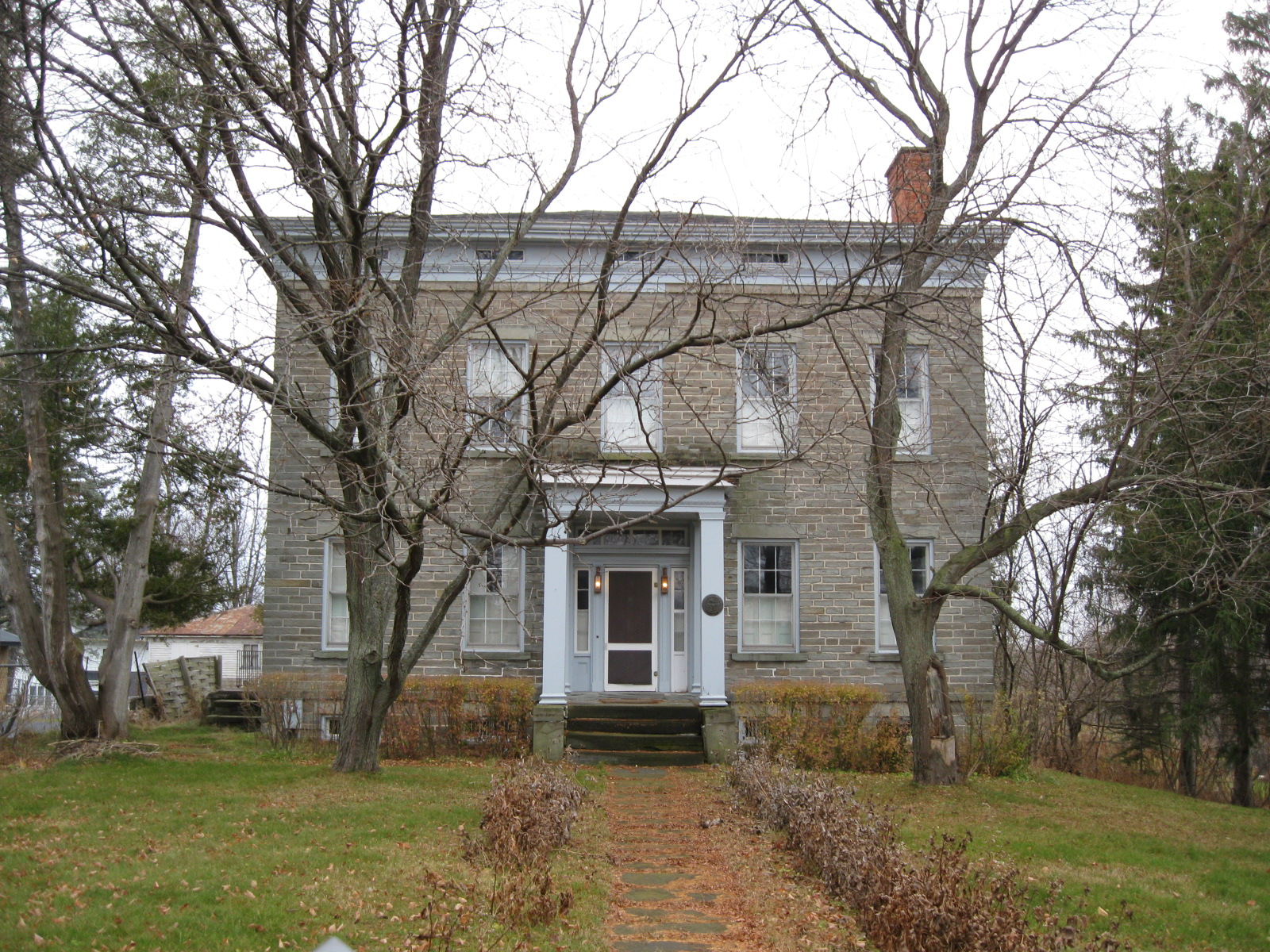
- Peter Chandler House, November 2009

- Location within New York Location within the United States
- Location: 5897 Main St., Mexico, New York
- Coordinates: 43°27′35″N 76°13′45″W
- Area: less than one acre
- Built: 1838
- Architectural style: Greek Revival
- MPS: Mexico MPS
- NRHP reference No.: 91001626
- Added to NRHP: November 14, 1991

The Peter Chandler House is a historic house located at 5897 Main Street in Mexico, Oswego County, New York.

== Description and history ==
It is a formal, two-story, Greek Revival/Exotic Revival style residence constructed of grey sandstone. The residence was built in 1838 and is five bays in width with a symmetrically composed facade and one chimney piercing its roof.

It was listed on the National Register of Historic Places on November 14, 1991.
