= Thayer Farmstead =

- U.S. National Register of Historic Places
- U.S. Historic district
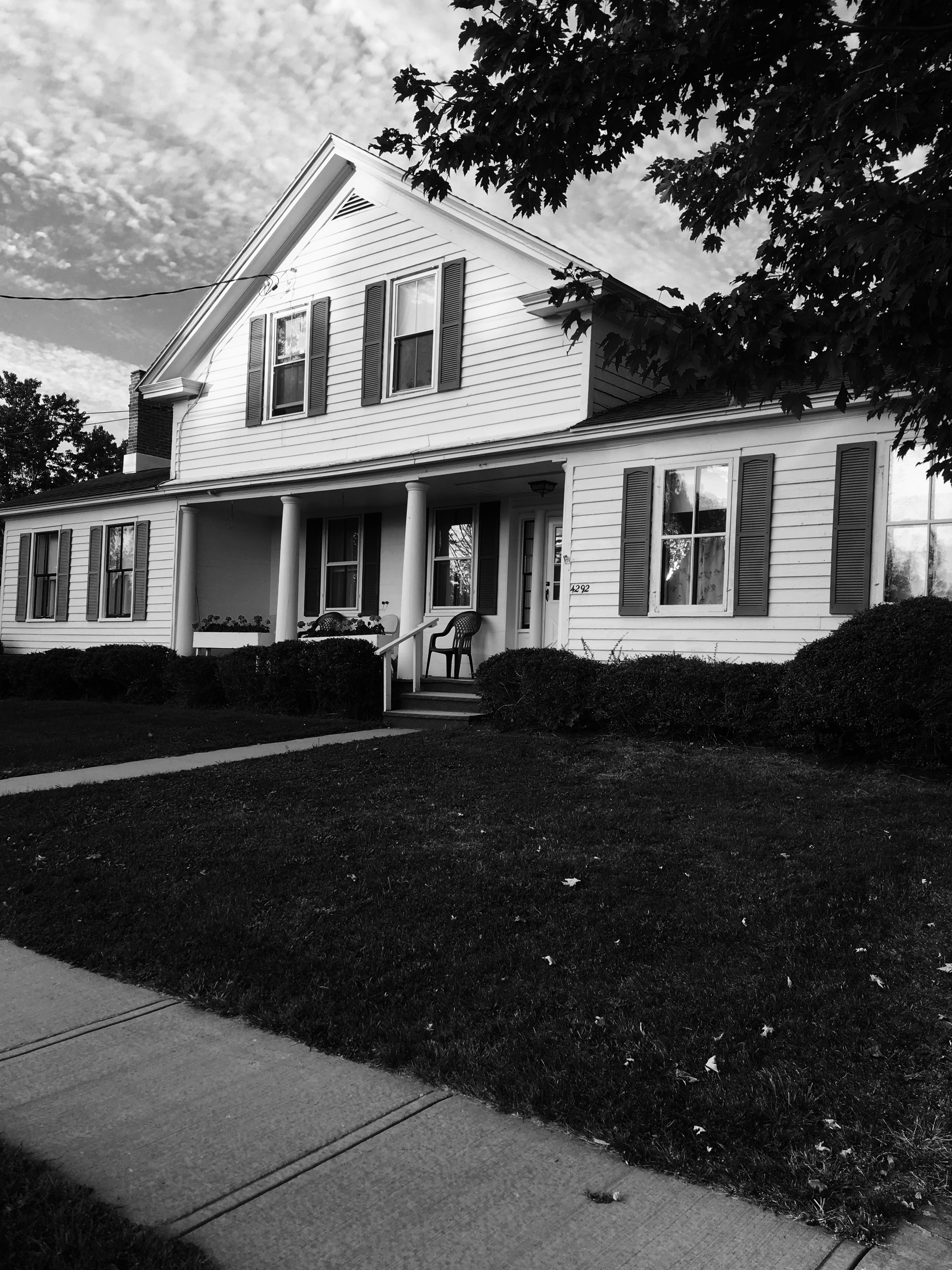

- Location within New York Location within the United States
- Nearest city: Mexico, New York
- Coordinates: 43°27′11″N 76°13′35″W
- Area: 13.3 acres (5.4 ha)
- Built: 1836
- Architectural style: Early Republic
- MPS: Mexico MPS
- NRHP reference No.: 91001631
- Added to NRHP: November 14, 1991

Thayer Farmstead is a historic farm complex and national historic district located at Mexico in Oswego County, New York. The district includes two contributing structures; the farmhouse and horse barn with small carriage shed. Also on the property are a contributing The farmhouse is composed of a two-story central section flanked by symmetrical one story wings. It is a frame building built about 1836.

It was listed on the National Register of Historic Places in 1991.
