= Jerry Rescue =

Public rescue of a fugitive slave in Syracuse, New York

The Jerry Rescue occurred on October 1, 1851, and involved the public rescue of a fugitive slave who had been arrested the same day in Syracuse, New York, during the anti-slavery Liberty Party's state convention. The escaped slave was William Henry, a 40-year-old cooper from Missouri whose slave name was "Jerry."

== Background ==
New York was sympathetic to slaves because it was a free state, and a number of abolitionists lived in the area. Syracuse became an active center for the abolitionist movement due in large part to the influence of Gerrit Smith, from Madison County, and a group allied with him, mostly associated with the Unitarian Church and their pastor, Reverend Samuel May, in Syracuse, as well as Quakers in nearby Skaneateles, supported by abolitionists in many other religious congregations. Other prominent abolitionists from the area were Frederick Douglass, Matilda Joslyn Gage, John W. Jones, William Marks and Harriet Tubman. Prior to the Civil War, due to the work of Reverend Jermain Wesley Loguen (a fugitive slave himself) and others in defiance of federal law, Syracuse became known as the "great central depot on the Underground Railroad." Its central location meant that many slaves passed through while traveling to freedom in Canada.

In 1850, the Fugitive Slave Act was passed by the United States Congress. W. Freeman Galpin wrote in the journal New York History that passage of the law "touched Syracuse to the quick". Prominent abolitionists in Syracuse joined in protest of the law, including Samuel May. May organised two protests of the law in October. An event in January 1851 featured George Thompson, a British abolitionist, as a speaker. In May, the American Anti-Slavery Society held a meeting in Syracuse, which was attended by William Lloyd Garrison.

On May 26, Secretary of State Daniel Webster visited the city. He spoke at Frazee Hall for two hours and warned that the Fugitive Slave Law would be enforced even "here in Syracuse in the midst of the next Anti-Slavery Convention, if the occasion shall arise."

== Early life ==
William Henry, who would later call himself Jerry, was born into slavery in North Carolina in 1811 by a slave named Ciel on the property of their owner, William Henry, in Buncombe County, North Carolina. Ciel came to be in William Henry's possession when he inherited her through marriage of a widow from the nearby McReynolds family. Although there is no documentation to prove so, "Jerry, with his red hair and light skin tone, was most likely the son of William Henry". In 1818, when Jerry was seven years old, William Henry pursued manifest destiny and moved his operations to the town of Hannibal in Marion County, Missouri. Here Jerry would grow up and hone his skills as a carpenter and a cooper. Jerry was especially known for his skill crafting chairs.

In 1843 Jerry fled from Missouri. Although Jerry's initial destination is unknown, it is speculated that he found himself in the Illinois town of Quincy, only twelve miles north of William Henry's residence in Hannibal. Although Jerry's exact escape route has been lost to history, there is evidence that he evaded capture twice, once in Chicago, Illinois, and also in Milwaukee, Wisconsin. Due to these failed captures, his owner, and presumed father, William Henry, sold off the rights to Jerry to Thomas Miller for $400. As this sale had taken place after the Fugitive Slave Act had passed, it enabled Miller to more effectively continue the search to return Jerry to slavery.

In the winter of 1849/1850, Jerry arrived in Syracuse. Through his travels, he had heard of anti-slavery nature that the community of Syracuse fostered and desired to make a home there, rather than continuing his journey to Canada. Jerry was able to find work under Charles F. Williston as a cabinet maker. Shortly into his employment, Williston's shop workmen's committee declared that if Jerry was employed there, they would leave. However, Williston stood by Jerry and would eventually refer to Jerry as "a favorite". In 1851, Jerry made the decision to leave Williston's shop and work at Morrell's cooperage in order to make better wages.

Although Jerry would establish himself in various establishments of the community, such as the church of Samuel J. May's Unitarian Church, he was still mistreated by members of the community. Jerry was frequently arrested for crimes such as theft and assault and battery ("as a result of his heated relationship with Sarah Colwell"), of which he was never guilty. As a result, Jerry knew better than to struggle and would clear whatever legal trouble he was in after his arrest. However, Jerry was not aware that his ownership had been purchased by William Henry's stepson John McReynolds for $400. With the Fugitive Slave Law of 1850 on McReynolds' side, he had every intention of retrieving Jerry.

== Planning the rescue ==
The plan to rescue him was hatched in the South Warren Street, Syracuse, office of Dr. Hiram Hoyt.

Following Jerry's unsuccessful escape the Syracuse Vigilance Committee took matters of the fugitive's freedom into their own hands. Developing a strategic plan, the committee ensured Jerry would escape to freedom. They devised a plan that would rely on resistance without violence. Participants were carefully instructed to avoid injuring anyone. Stealthy and swift, the final plan would conceal Jerry in New York until it was safe for him to cross over the border to Canada. A horse and buggy would be stationed near the police station to transport Jerry. At a prearranged signal, the crowd would break into the police office building, surrounding the guards while Jerry was ushered out to the buggy. Jerry would be transported to a designated spot where he would then be put into hiding until it was safe for him to travel to Canada. Following finalization of the plan, Ira Cobb and the Reverend L. D. Mansfield, both vigilance committee members, proceeded to the courtroom to monitor events so they could give the signal to begin. Implementation was set to occur sometime around 8 PM.

== Rescue ==
On October 1, the day of Jerry's arrest, there was a Liberty Party meeting in the Syracuse Congregationalist Church, which was attended by many prominent abolitionists, including Gerrit Smith. Smith would go on to help plan the rescue, and would use his contacts as a prominent abolitionist to secure Jerry's passage out of Syracuse and into safety in Canada. Due to Smith's wealth, the perpetrators were able to procure a carriage and access to multiple safe houses to transport and hide Jerry on his way to Canada.

The first three prominent men to arrive in the police office were Smith, Samuel May (who was another prominent abolitionist), and Leonard Gibbs, who offered to represent Jerry. The other two offered their own legal counsel and emotional support to Jerry (Murphy, 5). Gibbs delayed the proceedings by requesting that James Lear hand over his weapons, and also demanded that Jerry be unshackled (Murphy, 78). Soon after, the crowd urged Jerry to escape at about 2:30 in the afternoon, a request which Jerry answered by fleeing. Although he was returned, his escape cost his persecutors much time, and had the effect of gathering further support; many on the streets were appalled at the way Jerry was treated by the federal marshals. By the time the trial resumed at 5:30 p.m., two more lawyers, Hervey Sheldon and D.D. Hillis arrived to bring legal arguments against the prosecution. These two succeeded in delaying the proceedings further. The longer the trial lasted, the angrier the crowd became that Jerry was not being released.

At 8:00 p.m, a small crowd of people, armed with weapons from Wheaton's hardware shop, stormed the police office. As planned, one of the people with Jerry in the police station extinguished the gas lights, making Jerry's defense more difficult. Others who had not been part of the initial plan, including William L. Salmon, joined in as well, and together they breached the doors of the building. Although Jerry's defenders fired some warning shots, they relinquished Jerry to his rescuers when they realized they were heavily outnumbered. The crowd helped to obscure his rescuers, and Jerry was rushed to a carriage, which took him eventually to Caleb Davis’ house.

== Hiding and Canada ==
The crowd rushed Jerry to a carriage that brought him to Lucy Watson's home. She tended to Jerry's wounds and removed his ankle shackles. Lucy proceeded to bury them in the garden. The handcuffs were harder to remove and needed the help of a blacksmith named Peter Lilly. Eventually, he removed the cuffs, and Lucy dressed Jerry in women's clothes as a disguise. Jason Hoyt and James Davis brought Jerry from Watson's house to Caleb Davis's home where he hid for four days. Davis was a well-known Democrat who had a reputation for being vocally anti-abolitionist. He was one of the last people that anyone assumed would be involved in the Jerry Rescue, and even after the rescue, Davis continued to speak out against abolitionists. One witness reported that Davis was still, "on the street cursing the abolitionists and the whole business."

There were a number of reasons that Davis agreed to hide Jerry in his basement, and not all of them were altruistic. Although Caleb Davis was moved by Jerry's initial escape attempt, and thought that the brutal beating Jerry received at the hands of the police was uncalled for, that was not the only reason he agreed to harbor the man. Caleb Davis, more than anything, was upset at the personal liberties being taken from the Syracuse people. He felt that the militia had no place in the matter, and it was wrong for the government to intervene in the state and the city's matters. More than anything Caleb Davis could be considered anti-slavery more than an abolitionist. The difference here is in reasoning behind being against slavery or the Fugitive Slave Act. Abolitionists found a moral reasoning against slavery and believed it was their mission to get freedom for all people in every state of the union. Anti-Slavery believers did not necessarily want slavery to be completely eradicated, rather they did not want slavery to interfere with their own lives or potential earnings. They did not see a problem with slavery continuing to exist in the South, but they did find issue when slavery interrupted their lives in the North, or took away potential jobs and soil prospects in the West. Davis can be more aptly described as part of the second group due to his staunch upset at the militia intervening in the Jerry Rescue and his lack of continued role in Syracuse's attempts at abolition. Still, the two groups' interests converged in this moment, and Caleb Davis played a key role in bringing Jerry out of Syracuse and into freedom in Canada.

There is some contention on what happened after the four days that Jerry spent hiding in Davis's home. One story is that Caleb Davis put Jerry at the bottom of his cart and went out on his weekly drive to collect beef for his butcher shop. Although Davis was followed by other wagons that wanted to recapture Jerry and bring him back to the South to be put into slavery again, they were helped by a tollkeeper whom he had bribed a few hours earlier to pretend to be asleep. Some say that James Davis and Jason Hoyt actually came and collected Jerry to bring him to the next stop in his escape to Canada, and they were the ones that went through the harrowing ordeal of the wagon chase. Jerry was then brought to an Underground Railroad station thirty miles away in Mexico, New York. From Mexico, New York, he was then brought westward of Oswego until he was able to cross Lake Ontario into Canada. He settled in Kingston, Ontario, where he worked as a cooper and carpenter.

== Arrest and trial of rescue participants ==
The suspects were arrested and some were tried for their actions. Supporters of the rescue, including U.S. Senator William H. Seward, raised funds to pay the bonds of the suspects. Nine others, including Loguen, were charged, but fled to Canada. The trials of those people who participated in the rescue were slated to occur in Albany in January 1852. However, the trials were repeatedly postponed. The first trial was postponed until June. This trial was then moved to October, and October's trial was then postponed until January 1853. In January 1853, Enoch Reed, a black man, was tried and found "not guilty" of violating the Fugitive Slave Law. Since John McReynolds had purchased Jerry in absentia, it was never determined that he had a valid and legal claim to Jerry's service. Consequently, Reed was not found to be in violation of the law. Instead, Enoch Reed was convicted for resisting a federal officer. Reed died before his appeal could be heard. The trials of the other rescuers resulted in William Salmon being acquitted, Ira Cobb and J.B. Brigham cases resulting in hung juries, and the other cases being postponed indefinitely.

In the end, twelve men were arrested for helping out with the rescue, but only one was convicted on a minor charge. The court hearings ended at the end of 1853. However, charges against the remaining defendants were not dropped until June 1861.

== Jerry Rescue building and monument ==
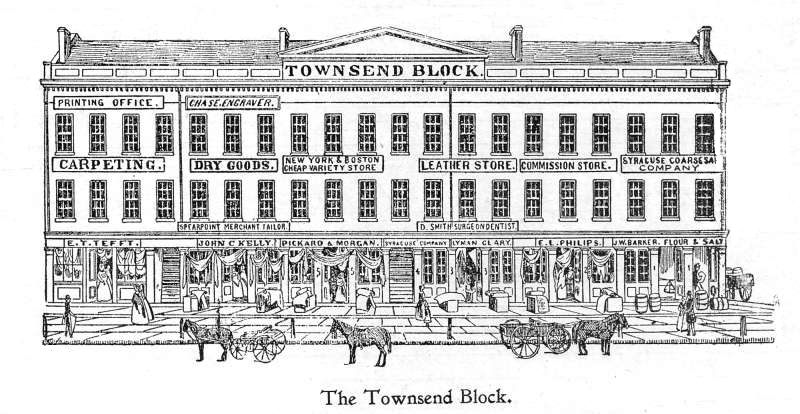
Townsend Block in Syracuse, New York in Clinton Square - The Jerry Rescue Building constructed in 1843 - Syracuse Herald

The event was commemorated in the 1850s when the Townsend Block was renamed the Jerry Rescue Building, which is no longer standing. The building, constructed in 1829, was located on the south side of Clinton Square, at the corner of Water and Clinton Streets. The event is now commemorated with a monument in Clinton Square, Syracuse.

== Jerry Rescue Day ==
Jerry Rescue Day was a day in which people would honor the memory of Jerry's rescue and celebrate his road to freedom. It was held every October 1 until the start of the Civil War. This holiday was celebrated by abolitionists and were primarily in the Syracuse, New York, area. The first Jerry Rescue Day was celebrated one year after the events itself. Described in the book The Jerry Rescue by Angela F. Murphy, participants "heard speeches, read poetry, sang songs, and passed resolutions that upheld the right to resist laws for slavery. They collected funds to defray the legal expenses of the rescuers and to keep the Underground Railroad running in central New York. They characterized the rescue of Jerry as "of incalculable value, as an efficient teacher and practical expounder of sound doctrines in regard to law, and slavery, and kidnapping," and pledged that it "should be celebrated every year, until there shall no longer be a wretch, who dares to be a kidnapper, and no longer be a slaveholder to give employment to a kidnapper."

As time went on, these celebrations became increasingly more in favor of violence when it came to the defense of fugitive slaves. One of the main advocates, when it came to this concept, was Frederick Douglass. "In 1853 he engaged in an argument with Garrisonian William Burleigh on the subject, and at the 1854 celebration he and Garrison himself held a lengthy debate. After Garrison spoke, pressing for an emphasis on moral suasion in the fight against slavery, Douglass lifted up a pair of broken shackles, said to be those that held Jerry, and he asked "how many arguments, frowns, resolutions, appeals, and entreaties would be necessary to break them."

These celebrations would come to an end because one of its most important founding members and annual speaker, Gerrit Smith, became frustrated with the country's limited progress toward emancipation. Sadly, this celebration would not happen again until a reenactment for its 150th anniversary in 2001. During this anniversary, the town of Syracuse erected a monument in honor of Jerry Henry.

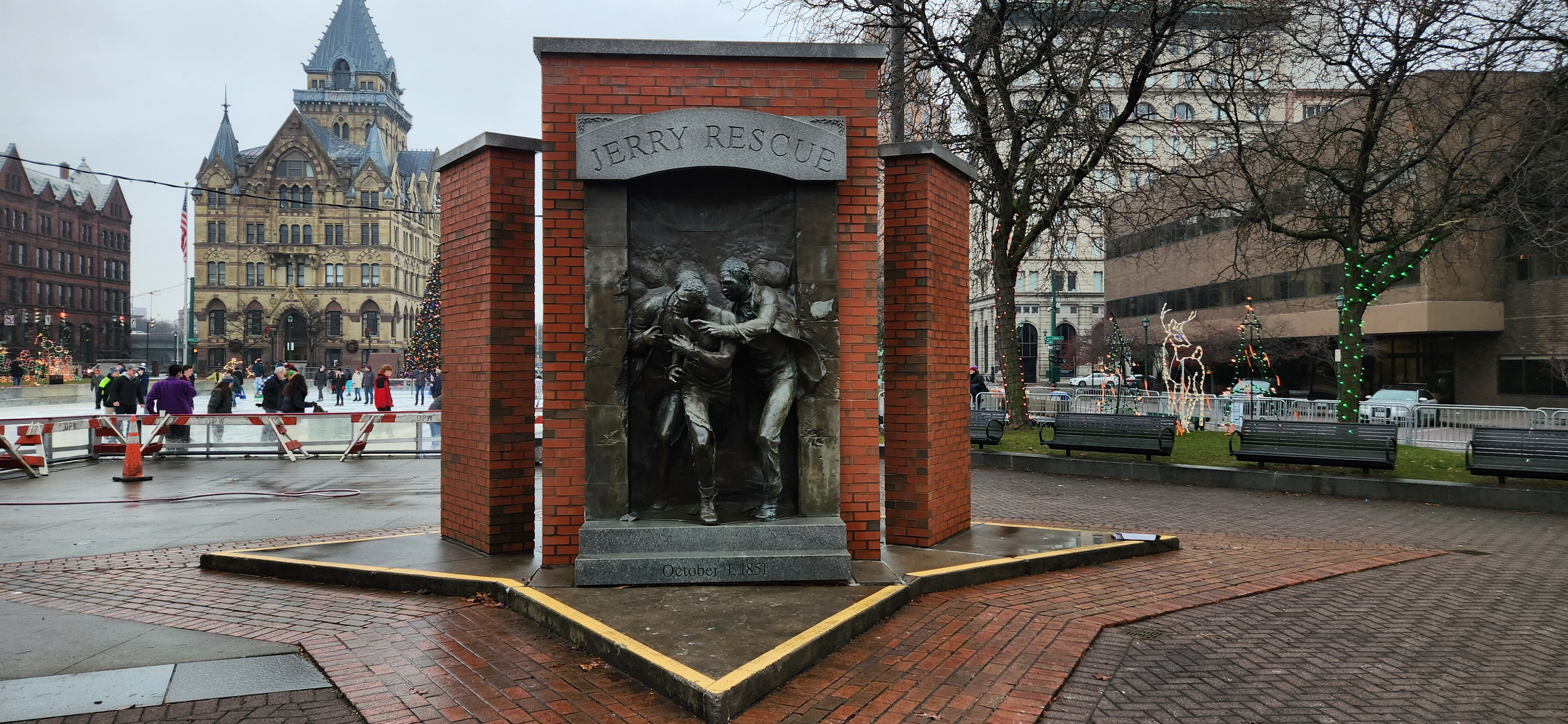
Jerry Rescue Monument in Clinton Square in Syracuse, New York, 2023

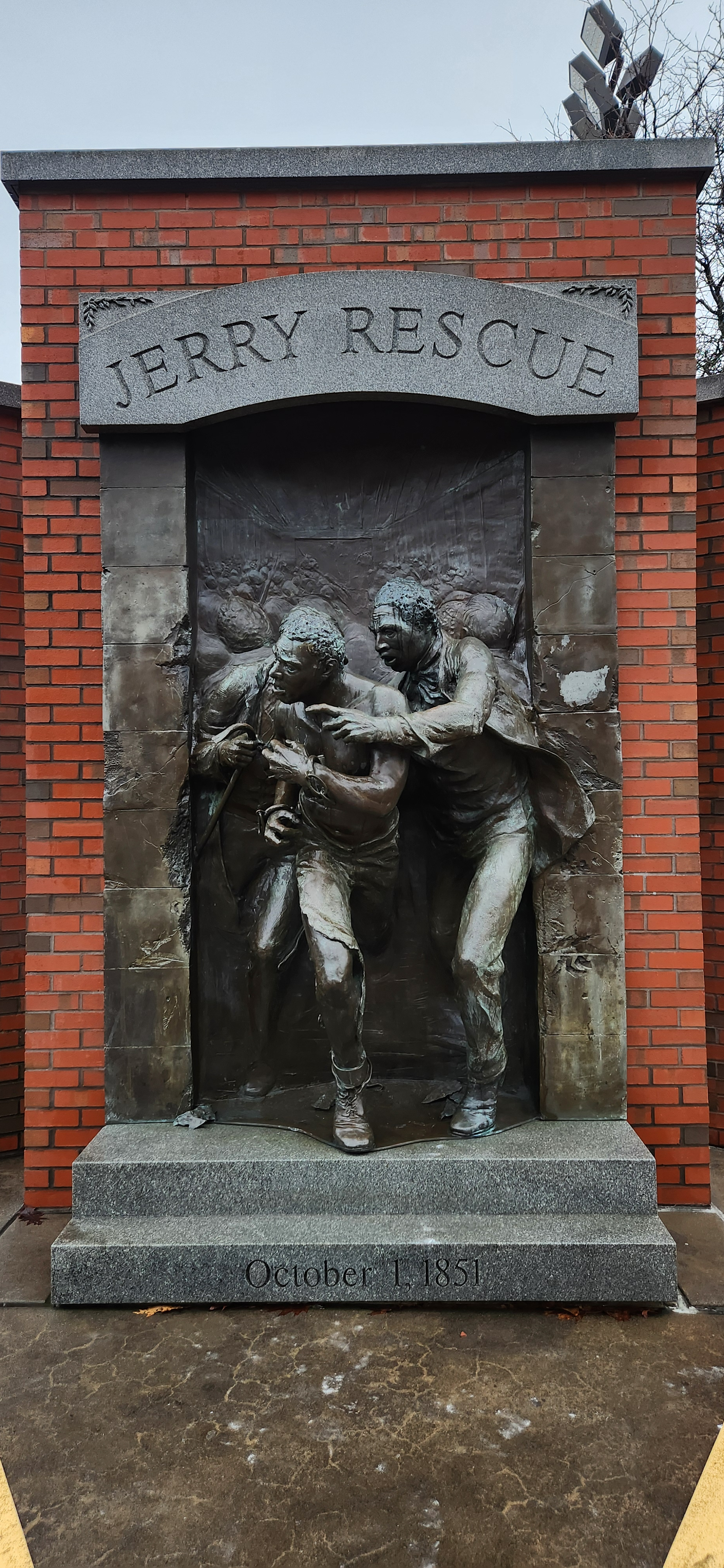
Jerry Rescue Monument

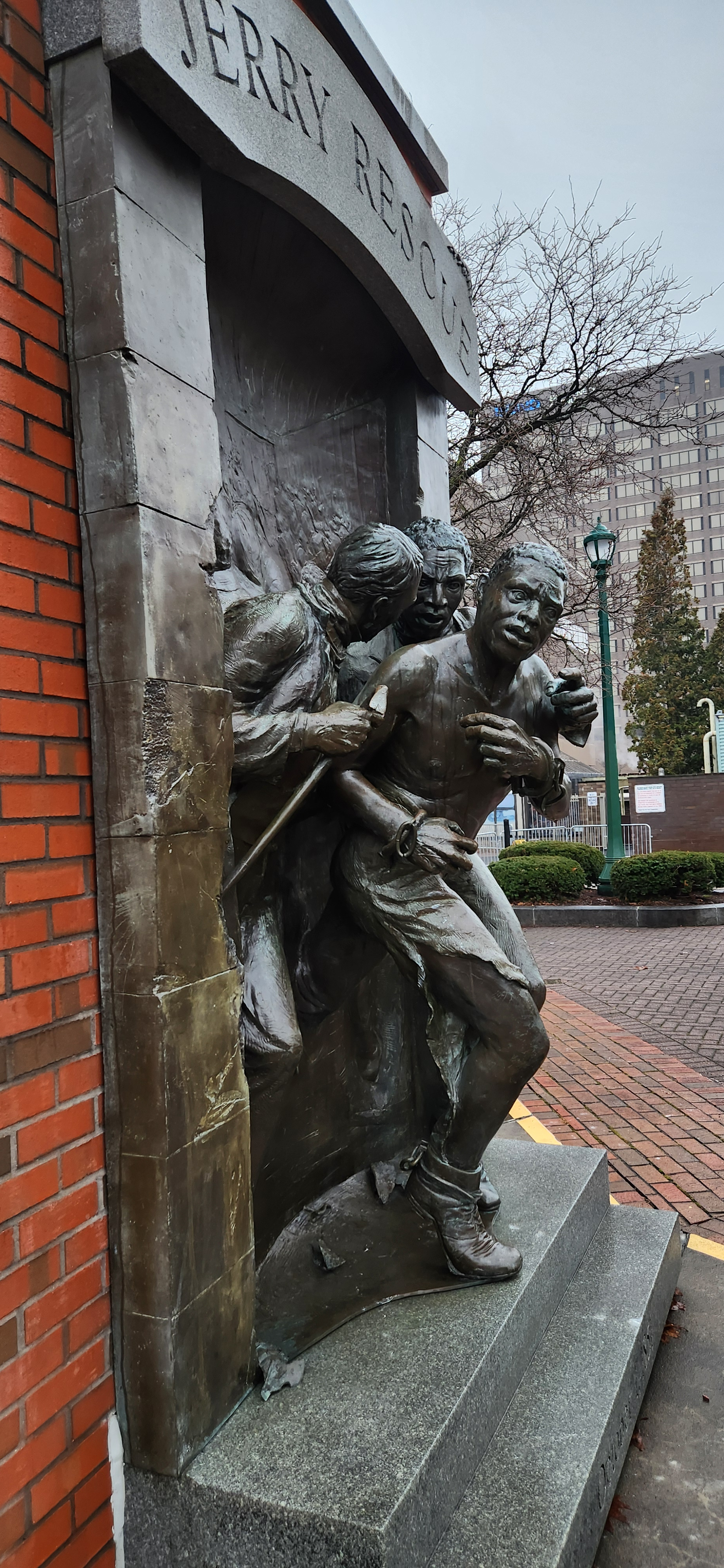
Jerry Rescue Monument

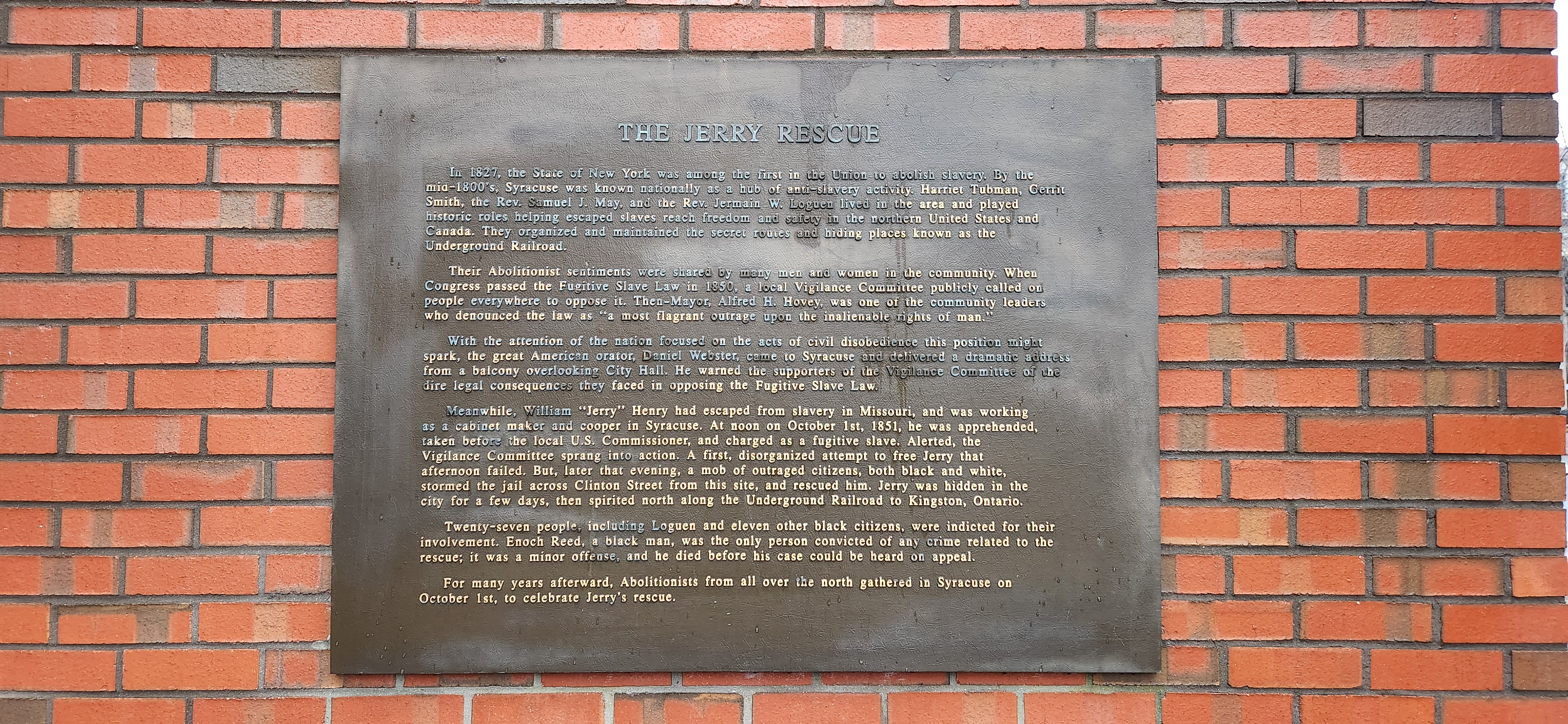
Story Placard on Jerry Rescue Monument

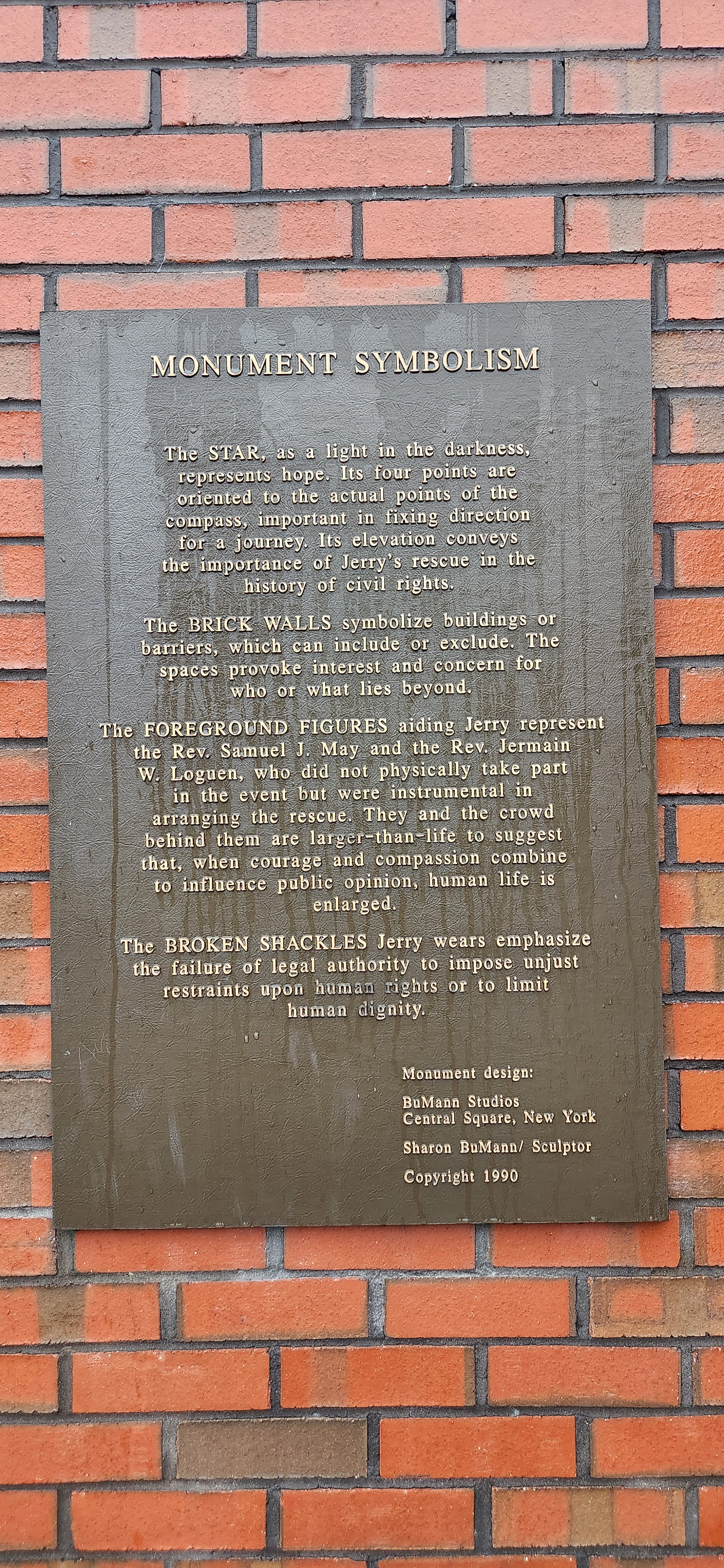
Sculpture Placard on Jerry Rescue Monument

== See also ==
- Joshua Glover, another slave who was rescued in similar circumstances in 1854
