= Mexico Octagon Barn =

- U.S. National Register of Historic Places
- Location within New York Location within the United States
- Location: 5276 Ames St., Mexico, New York
- Coordinates: 43°27′8″N 76°14′31″W
- Area: less than one acre
- Built: 1880
- Architectural style: Octagon
- MPS: Mexico MPS
- NRHP reference No.: 91000527
- Added to NRHP: June 20, 1991

Mexico Octagon Barn is a historic octagon-shaped barn located at Mexico in Oswego County, New York. It is a wood frame one story structure with a fieldstone foundation built about 1880.

It was listed on the National Register of Historic Places in 1991.
