= The Mexico Stone Store =

Historic commercial building in New York, United States

- U.S. National Register of Historic Places
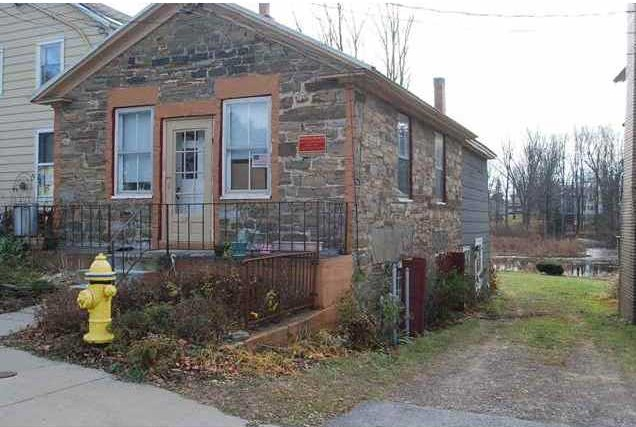

- Location within New York Location within the United States
- Location: 3201 Main St. Mexico, New York
- Coordinates: 43°27′34.95″N 76°13′33.01″W
- Area: 0.9 acres (0.36 ha)
- NRHP reference No.: 10000103
- Added to NRHP: March 23, 2010

The Mexico Stone Store, also known as The Little Stone House, is a historic commercial building located at Mexico in Oswego County, New York. It was built as late as the 1830s and is a one-story, stone building with a gable roof. At the rear is a two-story frame extension. It is believed to be Mexico's oldest surviving commercial building.

It was listed on the National Register of Historic Places in 2010.
