= Mexico Central School District =

School district in the U.S. state of New York

Mexico Academy & Central School

Location
- Mexico, New York Oswego County United States

District information
- Motto: Inspiring Leadership and Excellence in All!
- Grades: Pre-K-12
- Established: 1956
- Superintendent: Donna Runner
- Schools: 5
- Budget: $57,852,378 (2019-20)

Students and staff
- Students: 2,100
- Teachers: 208
- Staff: 372
- Athletic conference: Section III
- District mascot: Tigers
- Colors: Orange and Black

Other information
- Website: https://www.mexicocsd.org/

Mexico Academy & Central School District is a school district in Mexico, New York, United States.

The district operates five schools: Mexico High School, Mexico Middle School, Mexico Elementary, New Haven Elementary and Palermo Elementary.

== District ==
The District offices are located by their Middle School at 16 Fravor Rd, Mexico, NY.

=== Selected Former Superintendents ===
- Robert R. Pritchard
- Nelson Bauersfeld
- Michael Havens
- G. Scott Hunter–?-2005
- Michael A. Maroun–2005-2006
- Sean Bruno

== Mexico High School ==
Mexico High School

Location
- 3338 Main Street; Central New York (CNY); Central New York; Mexico, Oswego, New York 13114; United States; 43.46059°N 76.23469°W

Information
- Type: Public
- Motto: Inspiring Excellence and Leadership in All!
- Religious affiliation: Secular
- School board: Mexico Academy and Central School District (MACSD)
- School district: Mexico Academy and Central School District (MACSD)
- Authority: New York State Department of Education
- Superintendent: Dr. Donna J. Runner
- Principal: Ryan Lanigan
- Head teacher: Ryan Lanigan
- Staff: 123
- Faculty: 68
- Grades: 9-12
- Age range: 14-18
- Language: English
- Hours in school day: 7
- Colors: Orange and Black
- Mascot: Tigers
- Newspaper: The Talkative
- Yearbook: The Mexiconian
- Athletic Director: Andrew Gates
- Website: Mexico High School

Mexico High School is located at 3338 Main Street and serves grades 9 through 12. The current principal is Mr. Christopher Soluri, and the current assistant principal is Ms. Brittany Wylie.

== Mexico Middle School ==
Mexico Middle School

Location
- 16 Fravor Road Unit A Central New York (CNY); Central New York; Mexico, Oswego, New York 13114; United States; 43.46347°N 76.24469°W

Information
- Type: Public, Coeducational
- Motto: Inspiring Excellence and Leadership in All!
- Religious affiliation: Secular
- School board: Mexico Academy and Central Schools
- School district: Mexico Academy and Central School District (MACSD)
- Authority: New York State Department of Education
- Superintendent: Dr. Donna J. Runner
- Principal: Kimberly D. Holliday
- Head teacher: Kimberly D. Holliday
- Staff: 107
- Teaching staff: 64
- Grades: 5-8
- Hours in school day: 6
- Colors: Orange and Black
- Mascot: Tigers
- Website: Mexico Middle School

Mexico Middle School is located at 16 Fravor Road and serves grades 5 through 8. The current principal is Ms. Kimberly Holliday.

== Mexico Elementary School ==
Mexico Elementary School

Location
- 26 Academy Street; Central New York (CNY); Central New York; Mexico, Oswego, New York 13114; United States; 43.46182°N 76.23616°W

Information
- Type: Public, Coeducational
- Motto: Inspiring Excellence and Leadership in All!
- Religious affiliation: Secular
- School board: Mexico Academy and Central Schools
- School district: Mexico Academy and Central School District (MACSD)
- Authority: New York State Department of Education
- Superintendent: Dr. Donna J. Runner
- Principal: Mrs. Amy Fiedler-Horack
- Staff: 56
- Teaching staff: 33
- Grades: PK-4
- Colors: Orange and Black
- Mascot: Tigers
- Website: Mexico Elementary School School

Mexico Elementary School is located at 26 Academy Street and serves grades pre-K through 4. The current principal is Ms. Amy Fiedler-Horack.

== New Haven Elementary ==
New Haven Elementary

Information
- Type: Public, Coeducational
- Principal: Jennifer Granholm
- Staff: 38
- Teaching staff: 21
- Grades: PK-4
- Website: New Haven Elementary

New Haven Elementary is located at 4320 State Route 104 and serves grades pre-K through 4. The current principal is Ms. Jennifer Granholm.

== Palermo Elementary ==
Palermo Elementary

Information
- Type: Public, Coeducational
- Principal: Robert Briggs
- Staff: 47
- Teaching staff: 22
- Grades: PK-4
- Hours in school day: 6
- Website: Palermo Elementary

Palermo Elementary is located at 1638 County Route 45 in Palermo and serves grades pre-K through 4. The current principal is Mr. Robert Briggs.
