= Lamar =

Lamar or Lamarr is a word with multiple origins that may refer to:

== People ==
- Lamar (given name), a list of people
- Lamar (surname), a list of people

== Fictional characters ==
- Hedley Lamarr, in Mel Brooks's movie Blazing Saddles, played by Harvey Korman
- Lamar Latrell, in the Revenge of the Nerds movie series
- Lamar Alford, in the off-Broadway musical Godspell
- Lamar Davis, in the 2013 video game Grand Theft Auto V
- Lamarr, a headcrab from the game Half-Life 2
- Lamar Williams, professional otaku and member of MD-5 from the Meta Runner internet series

== Places in the United States ==
- Lamar, Arkansas, a city
- Lamar, Colorado, a home rule municipality and county seat
- Lamar, Indiana, an unincorporated community
- Lamar, Mississippi, an unincorporated community
- Lamar, Missouri, a city and county seat
- Lamar, Nebraska, a village
- Lamar, Oklahoma, a town
- Lamar, Pennsylvania, a census-designated place
- Lamar, South Carolina, a town
- Lamar, Tennessee, an unincorporated community
- Lamar, Texas, an unincorporated community and census-designated place
- Lamar, West Virginia, an unincorporated community
- Lamar, Wisconsin, an unincorporated community
- Lamar County, Alabama
- Lamar County, Georgia
  - Lamar Mounds and Village Site, an archaeological site in Georgia
- Lamar County, Mississippi
- Lamar County, Texas
- Lamar River, Wyoming
- Lamar Township, Barton County, Missouri
- Lamar Township, Clinton County, Pennsylvania

== Schools in the United States ==
- Lamar University, a public university in Beaumont, Texas
- Lamar Institute of Technology, a public technical school in Beaumont, Texas
- Lamar State College–Port Arthur, a community college in Port Arthur, Texas
- Lamar State College–Orange, a community college in Orange, Texas
- Lamar Community College, a community college in Lamar, Colorado
- Lamar High School (disambiguation)
- Lamar School (Meridian, Mississippi)
- Lamar Middle School (Irving, Texas)

== Transportation ==
- Lamar Municipal Airport (Colorado), Lamar, Colorado, United States
- Lamar (Amtrak station), Lamar, Colorado
- Lamar (RTD), a light rail station in Lakewood, Colorado
- Lamar Municipal Airport (Missouri), Lamar, Missouri

== Other uses ==
- USS Lamar (APA-47), a World War II transport
- USS Lamar (PCE-899), a patrol craft commissioned in 1945 and transferred to the US Coast Guard in 1964
- Lamar Towers, a building in Jeddah, Saudi Arabia
- Lamar Building, Augusta, Georgia, United States, on the National Register of Historic Places
- Lamar Advertising Company, an outdoor advertising company

== See also ==
- De Lamar, Idaho, United States, a ghost town
