= Lamar (given name) =

Lamar or Lamarr is a given name. Notable people with the name include:

- Lamar Alexander (born 1940), American politician
- Lamar Alford (1944–1991), American actor and singer
- Lamar Allen (1914–1989), American baseball and football player
- LaMar Baker (1915–2003), American politician and businessman
- Lamar Batista (born 1998), American soccer player
- Lamar Behairi (born 2007), Egyptian rhythmic gymnast
- LaMar C. Berrett (1926–2007), American professor
- Lamar Blount (1920–2007), American football player
- Lamar Boren (1917–1986), American cinematographer
- Lamar Brown (born 2007), American football player
- Lamar Butler (born 1983), American basketball player
- Lamar Campbell (born 1976), American football player
- Lamar Campbell (born 1964), American gospel musician
- Lamar Card, American film director and producer
- Lamar John Ryan Cecil (1902–1958), American judge
- Lamar Chapman (born 1976), American football player
- LaMar Clark (1933–2006), American boxer
- Lamar Crowson (1926–1998), American concert pianist and a chamber musician
- Lamar Davis (1921–2014), American football player
- Lamar Divens (born 1985), American football player
- Lamar Dodd (1909–1996), American painter
- Lamar Fisher, American politician
- Lamar Fontaine (1829–1921), American military veteran, surveyor, poet and author
- Lamar Gant (born 1957), American powerlifter
- Lamar Giles (born 1979), American author
- Lamar Gordon (born 1980), American football player
- Lamar Green (born 1947), American basketball player
- Lamar Hasbrouck (born 1965), American physician
- Lamar Herron (born 1984), American football player
- Lamar Holmes (born 1989), American football player
- Lamar Hoover (1887–1944), American college football player and coach
- Lamarr Houston (born 1987), American football player
- LaMarr Hoyt (1955–2021), American baseball player
- Lamar Hunt (1932–2006), American businessman
- Lamar Hunt Jr. (born 1956), American businessman and sports promoter
- Lamar Jackson (born 1998), American football player
- Lamar Jackson (born 1997), American football player
- Lamar Jeffers (1888–1983), American politician
- Lamar Johnson (born 1994), Canadian actor and dancer
- Lamar Johnson (born 1950), American baseball player and coach
- Lamar Johnson (born 1991), Saint Lucian footballer
- Lamar Johnstone, American silent film actor and director
- Lamar Jordan (born 1994), American football player
- Lamar Bailey Karamañites, Panamanian filmmaker, activist, and educator
- Lamar King (born 1975), American football player
- Lamar Lathon (born 1967), American football player
- LaMar Lemmons Jr., American politician
- Lamar Liolevave (born 1995), Fiji international rugby league footballer
- Lamar Looney (1871–1935), American politician
- Lamar Louis (born 1993), American football player
- Lamar Lundy (1935–2007), American football player
- Lamar Mady (born 1990), American football player
- Lamar McGriggs (born 1968), American gridiron football player
- Lamar McHan (1932–1998), American football player
- Lamar Miller (born 1991), American football player
- Lamar Mills (born 1971), American football player
- Lamar Moore (born 1981), American Celebrity chef
- Lamar Morris (born 1999), English singer, songwriter and dancer
- Lamar Morris (1938–2023), American singer-songwriter
- Lamar Muse (1920–2007), American airline executive
- Lamar Myles (born 1986), American football player
- Lamar Neagle (born 1987), American soccer player
- Lamar Nelson (born 1991), Jamaican footballer
- Lamar Odom (born 1979), American basketball player
- Lamar Owens (born 1983), American football player and coach
- Lamar Parks (born 1970), American boxer
- Lamar Patterson (born 1991), American basketball player
- Lamar Perkins (1896–?), American politician
- Lamar Peters (born 1998), American basketball player
- Lamar Potter, American baseball player
- Lamar Powell (born 1993), English footballer
- Lamar Reynolds (born 1995), English footballer
- Lamar Richardson, American Broadway and television producer
- Lamar Rogers (born 1967), American football player
- Lamar Russ (born 1987), American boxer
- Lamar Skeeter, American basketball coach
- Lamar Smith (1892–1955), American civil rights activist
- Lamar Smith (born 1970), American former football running back
- Lamar Soutter (1909–1996), American academic
- Lamar Sternad (born 1977), American hotel administrator
- Lamar Stevens (born 1997), American basketball player
- Lamar Stringfield (1897–1959), American classical composer
- Lamar Taylor (born 2003), Bahamian swimmer
- Lamar Thomas (born 1970), American football player and color commentator
- Lamar Trotti (1900–1952), American movie screenwriter, producer and executive
- Lamar Waldron (born 1954), American writer and historian
- Lamar Walker (born 2000), Jamaican football player
- Lamar Weaver (1928–2013), American civil rights activist
- Lamar White Jr. (born 1982), American journalist
- Lamar Wilkerson (born 2001), American basketball player
- Lamar Williams (1949–1983), American musician, bassist for The Allman Brothers Band
- Lamarr Wilson (1977–2025), American YouTuber
- Lamar Wise, American politician
- LaMarr Woodley (born 1984), American football player

== See also ==
- J. Lamar Worzel (1919–2008), American geophysicist
- M. Lamar Keene (1936-1996), American self-confessed fraudulent spirit medium
- V. Lamar Gudger (1919–2004), American politician
- Lamar (surname)
