= Hans Davidsson =

Swedish organist and teacher (born 1958)

- Born: 1958 (age 67–68); Gothenburg, Västergötland, Sweden
- Education: University of Gothenburg; Sweelinck Conservatory
- Occupations: Organist; music educator
- Years active: 1986–present
- Awards: H. M. The King's Medal (2004)

Hans Davidsson (born 1958) is a Swedish organist and pedagogue. He was one of the driving forces behind establishing the organ research center GOArt and the Eastman Rochester Organ Initiative. He is currently professor of organ at the Royal Danish Academy of Music.

== Life ==
Davidsson was born in Gothenburg and studied organ at the University of Gothenburg with Hans Fagius and Rune Wåhlberg. He later spent three years at the Sweelinck Conservatory, Amsterdam, studying with Jacques van Oortmerssen. He began teaching organ at the university in 1986 and was appointed professor in 1988. In 1991, he became the first doctor of music performance in Sweden, successfully defending his dissertation on the organ music of Matthias Weckmann.

From 1995 until 2000, he was the director of the Göteborg Organ Art Center, GOArt, leading research in organ building and performance practice. From 2001 to 2012, he worked at the Eastman School of Music serving as professor of organ and project director of the Eastman Rochester Organ Initiative. In 2007, he was appointed professor of organ at University of the Arts Bremen and, in 2011, professor of organ at the Royal Danish Academy of Music.

In January 2004, he was awarded H. M. The King's Medal for "significant accomplishments in musicology and music, primarily in the fields of organ research and organ education".

== Selected Recordings ==
- Eastman Italian Baroque Organ (2006), with David Higgs and William Porter.
- French Symphonic Masterpieces (2002)
- The Complete Organ Works of Matthias Weckman, recorded twice, in 1991 on the organ in the Ludgerikirche, Norden and in 2004 on the North German baroque organ in Örgryte Nya Kyrka, Gothenburg, Sweden.
- The complete organ works of Dieterich Buxtehude: Dieterich Buxtehude and the Mean-Tone Organ, Dieterich Buxtehude: the Bach perspective. and Buxtehude and the Schnitger Organ
