= Lahmar (surname) =

Lahmar is a surname. Notable people with the surname include:

- Abdelkader Lahmar (born 1971), French politician
- Hamza Lahmar, Tunisian footballer
- Msaddak Lahmar (born 1960), Tunisian volleyball player
- Marouen Lahmar, Tunisian basketball player
- Ismahane Lahmar, Franco-Tunisian filmmaker
- Hassan Lahmar, Moroccan boxer
- Sabir Mahfouz Lahmar (born 1969), Bosnian citizen

== See also ==
- Lamar (surname)
- Lemar (surname)
- Lama (surname)
