= Örgryte Church =

Örgryte Church (Swedish: Örgryte kyrka) may refer to:

- Örgryte Old Church
- Örgryte New Church
