= Lamar (surname) =

Lamar, Lamarr or slight variations thereof is a surname of French origins.

Notable people with the name include:

- Adriana Lamar (1908–1946), Mexican film actress
- Ann Hannaford Lamar (born 1952), American judge
- Barbara La Marr (1896–1926), American actress
- Bill Lamar (1897–1970), American baseball player
- Bo Lamar (1951–2026), American basketball player
- Burney Lamar (born 1980), American race car driver
- Carlos Lamar (1908–?), Cuban fencer
- Charles Augustus Lafayette Lamar (1825–1865), American businessman
- Charles LaMarr, manager of the Chambers Brothers from the late 1960s to early 1970s
- Chuck LaMar (born 1956), American baseball executive
- Clarence Lamar (1915–1951), American baseball player
- Dave Lamar (born 1992), Filipino singer, songwriter, record producer, and director
- David Lamar (c.1877–1934), American con artist
- Dorothy Blount Lamar, American historian and activist
- Dequantes Lamar (1989–2024), American rapper known professionally as Rich Homie Quan
- Gazaway Bugg Lamar (1798–1874), American businessman
- Hedy Lamarr (1914–2000), Austrian actress and inventor
- Henry Lamar (1906–1985), American boxing and football coach
- Henry G. Lamar (1798–1861), American judge
- Holly Lamar, American country music singer and songwriter
- Horatio Lamar (1911–1998), American baseball player
- Hortensia Lamar (1888–1967), Cuban feminist
- Howard R. Lamar (1923–2023), American historian
- J. Robert Lamar (1866–1923), American politician
- Jake Lamar (born 1961), American writer, novelist, playwright and cultural critic
- Jason Lamar (born 1978), American football player
- John Basil Lamar (1812–1878), American politician
- Joseph Raphael De Lamar (1843–1918), American politician
- Joseph Rucker Lamar (1857–1916), American judge
- Kendrick Lamar (born 1987), American hip hop recording artist
- Leah Lamarr (born 1988), American comedian
- Leona LaMar (1883–1941), American stage mentalist
- Lin Lamar (born 2002), American Internet personality and OnlyFans model
- Lindsey Lamar (born 1990), American football player
- London Lamar (born 1990), American politician
- Lucius Quintus Cincinnatus Lamar I (1797–1834), American judge
- Lucius Quintus Cincinnatus Lamar II (1825–1893), American politician
- Luke Short (1854–1893), American Old West gunfighter, cowboy, and businessman
- M Lamar (born 1974), American composer, performer, and artist
- Mark Lamarr (born 1967), British comedian
- Mary Ann Lamar (1818–1889), American civic leader
- Mirabeau B. Lamar (1798–1859), American politician
- Phil LaMarr (born 1967), American comedian
- Rocky Lamar, American basketball coach
- Shoney Lamar, American singer-songwriter
- Tillie Lamar (1865–1891), American college football player
- Tre Lamar (born 1996), American football player
- Trey Lamar (born 1980), American lawyer and politician
- William Bailey Lamar (1853–1928), American politician
- William C. Lamar, American attorney
- William H. Lamar (1853–1928), American lawyer and government officeholder

== See also ==
- Justice Lamar (disambiguation)
- Lahmar (surname)
