= Todd Wilson (organist) =

American organist

Todd Wilson is an American organist and teacher based in Ohio.

== Early life and education ==
Born in Ohio, Wilson was a choirboy at Trinity Church in Toledo.

He studied organ with Wayne Fisher at the University of Cincinnati – College-Conservatory of Music, where he obtained Bachelor of Music and Master of Music degrees. He then studied with Russell Saunders at the Eastman School of Music. While at graduate school, he was organist and choirmaster at Calvary Episcopal Church in Cincinnati, and from 1978 to 1979 he was an assistant organist at Canterbury Cathedral in England.

== Career ==
After returning to the United States, Wilson served as organist of Collingwood Presbyterian Church in Toledo for a year before moving to the Cathedral of the Incarnation in Garden City, Long Island, New York. He was then director of music and organist at the Church of the Covenant in Cleveland, Ohio, for 19 years before becoming organist and artist-in-residence at Trinity Cathedral, Cleveland, in 2019.

Alongside his church and cathedral roles, Wilson has been active throughout his career as a teacher of organ music. From 1989 to 1993 he was head of the organ department at Baldwin Wallace Conservatory of Music in Berea, Ohio, and he is currently head of the music department at Cleveland Institute of Music. He is also house organist at Stan Hywet Hall and Gardens in Akron, curator of the pipe organ at Severance Hall, and organ curator of the Cleveland Orchestra.

Wilson regularly gives concerts and masterclasses around the world. He has performed with many notable orchestras, including the Cleveland Orchestra, the Los Angeles Philharmonic and the Atlanta Symphony Orchestra, performing in Tokyo, Vienna, Slovakia and extensively throughout the United States.

Wilson has won several competitions, such as the Grand Prix de Chartres and the Fort Wayne Competition, and has also sat on the jury for other competitions, including the St Albans International Organ Festival.

== Family ==
Wilson has been married twice and has two children from each marriage. His first wife, Anne, is also an organist and has performed in concert with him.

== Recordings ==
- The Organ Music of Gerre Hancock (Raven OAR-951) 2-CD set also in digital distribution — recorded in 2013 at St. Thomas Episcopal Church, New York, on the organ Hancock (1934-2012) played for more than 30 years as organist and master of the choristers at St. Thomas Church. Kevin Kwan plays a duet with Wilson on one track.
- Live from Severance Hall — Michael Sachs, trumpet and Todd Wilson, organ. Music for trumpet and organ, recorded live in April 2005.
- On a Sunday Afternoon, Vol. 5 (JAV 149) — Music by American composers, recorded live at Washington National Cathedral, featuring music by Sousa, Persichetti, Bolcom, Sowerby, Craig Phillips and others.
- Music of Charles Tournemire — Disques du Solstice (SOCD 148) - Recorded at Chartres Cathedral, Wilson plays two suites from "L’ Orgue Mystique" and other pieces; Phillipe Lefebvre plays the Five Improvisations.
- Music for Cello and Organ (JAV 140) — Todd Wilson and daughter, Rachel Wilson, cellist, play works by Elgar, Dupré, Messiaen, Saint-Saëns, Schumann and Lemare. Recorded at St. Luke's Episcopal Church, Evanston, Illinois.
- A Joyous Celebration! — Featuring a wide variety of Christmas music, this is the inaugural recording (2001) on the newly restored E. M. Skinner organ in Cleveland's Severance Hall.
- George Thalben-Ball & Friends (JAV 127) — The complete works of George Thalben-Ball with other music by Hollins, Walford Davies, Yon, Festing, Schubert, and Weitz. Recorded at the Cathedral of Our Lady Queen of the Most Holy Rosary, Toledo, Ohio.
- Frank Bridge and Friends (JAV 120) — The complete organ works of Frank Bridge with music by Bairstow, Britten, Ireland, Lang, Walton and Whitlock. Recorded at St. Margaret's Episcopal Church, Palm Desert, California.
- Double Forte (Delos DE 3175) — With David Higgs in music for two organists. Mozart, Saint-Saëns, Wagner, Hampton, J.C. Bach. Recorded at National City Christian Church, Washington, D.C.
- In a Quiet Cathedral (Delos DE 3145; 2-disc set) — Music of Bach, Brahms, Schumann, Vaughan Williams, Mozart, Langlais, Bridge, Sowerby, Benoit, Purvis, Tartini, Harris, Mendelssohn, Widor, Callahan, Strayhorn, Dupré, Shearing, Frescobaldi, Vierne, Rachmaninoff, Barber, Hilse. Recorded at Cathedral of St. Philip, Atlanta, Ga.
- The Naples Philharmonic (Summit DCD 145) - With David Hickman, Trumpet Conducted by Timothy Russell Dello Joio Antiphonal Fantasy, Planel Concerto for Trumpet; Persichetti The Hollow Men; Ives Variations on "America." Recorded at Philharmonic Center for the Arts, Naples, FL.
- Todd Wilson Plays Great French Virtuosic Organ Music (Delos DE 3123) — Jongen Sonata Eroica, Langlais Thème et Variations from "Hommage à Frescobaldi, Dupré Cortège et Litanie, Bonnet Variations de Concert, Demessieux Three Chorale Preludes, Widor Symphonie Romane. Recorded at the University of Alabama Concert Hall.
- Maurice Duruflé Organ Music (Complete) (Delos D/CD 3047) — Recorded at Church of St. Thomas Aquinas, Dallas, Texas.
- American Music from The Church of the Covenant — Choral and Organ Works by 14 American composers.
