= William Porter (organist) =

American organist (born 1946)

William Porter (born 1946) is an American organist, harpsichordist and improviser.

== Education ==
Porter studied organ at Oberlin College and Yale University, where he received the DMA degree in 1980.

== Career ==
Porter taught harpsichord and organ at Oberlin from 1974 to 1986 and taught organ, music history and music theory at the New England Conservatory in Boston from 1985 to 2002. He taught organ, organ improvisation and harpsichord at the Eastman School of Music from 2001-2013 and again from 2015. He taught at McGill University from 2004 to 2015.

Porter has mentioned Francis Chapelet, Klaas Bolt, and Harald Vogel as influences.

== Selected discography ==
- An Organ Portrait (1993), at the John Brombaugh organ in the Haga Church
- Krebs: Clavier-Übung (2001), at the Pehr Schiörlin organ in Gammalkil
- Music Sweet & Serious (2003), at the North German baroque organ in Örgryte Nya Kyrka
- Eastman Italian Baroque Organ (2006), with David Higgs and Hans Davidsson
