= EROI =

EROI may refer to:

- Energy return on investment.
- Eastman Rochester Organ Initiative.
