= Sonam Lama =

Sonam Lama may refer to:

- Sonam Lama (Sikkim politician), an Indian Buddhist monk and politician from Sikkim
- Sonam Lama (West Bengal politician), an Indian politician from West Bengal

== See also ==
- Sonam, a given name
- Lama (surname)
- Sonam Lamba (born 1997), an Indian television actress
- Sonam Lhamo (born 1988), a Bhutanese actress
