= Lemare =

Lemare is a surname. Notable people with the surname include:

- Edwin Lemare (1865–1934), English organist and composer
- Iris Lemare (1902–1997), English conductor and musician, daughter of Edwin
- Léa Lemare (born 1996), French ski jumper

== See also ==
- Lemar (given name)
