= Joe Garcia =

American politician (born 1963)

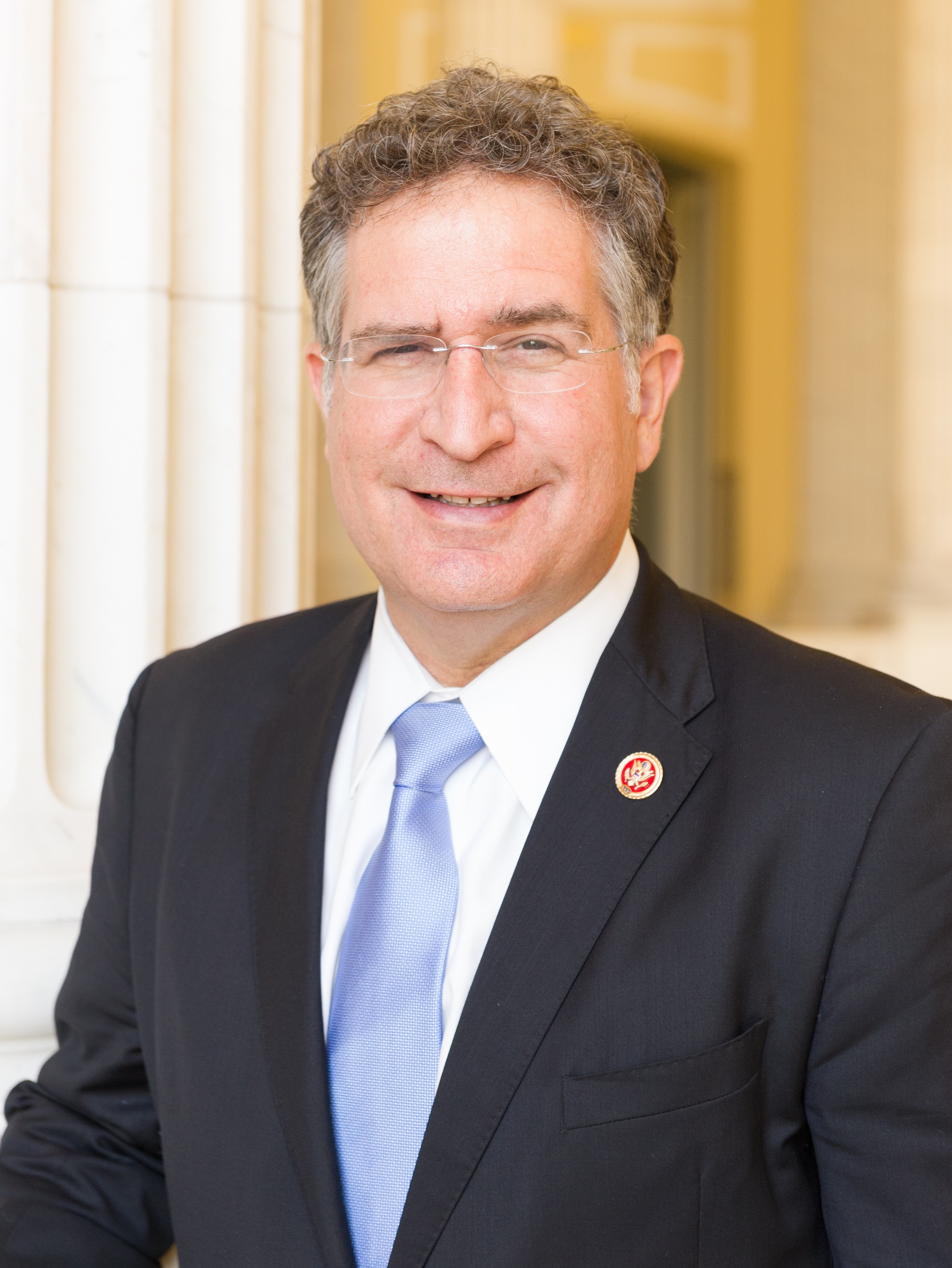

Member of the U.S. House of Representatives from Florida's 26th district
- In office January 3, 2013 – January 3, 2015
- Preceded by: David Rivera (redistricted)
- Succeeded by: Carlos Curbelo

Chair of the Florida Public Service Commission
- In office January 1999 – June 30, 2000
- Governor: Buddy MacKay; Jeb Bush
- Preceded by: Julia Johnson
- Succeeded by: Leon Jacobs

Commissioner of the Florida Public Service Commission
- In office August 19, 1994 – June 30, 2000
- Governor: Lawton Chiles; Buddy MacKay; Jeb Bush
- Preceded by: Luis J. Lauredo
- Succeeded by: Braulio Baez

Personal details
- Born: José Antonio Garcia Jr. October 12, 1963 (age 62) Miami Beach, Florida, U.S.
- Party: Democratic
- Spouse: Aileen Ugalde (m. 1992–2012)
- Children: 1
- Education: Miami Dade College; University of Miami (BA, JD)

José Antonio Garcia Jr. (born October 12, 1963), known as Joe Garcia, is an American attorney and politician. Garcia represented Florida's 26th congressional district in the House of Representatives from 2013 to 2015. A Democrat, Garcia represented most of western Miami-Dade County and the Florida Keys in Congress.

Garcia previously served as executive director of the Cuban American National Foundation and in the Department of Energy. In 2021, Garcia became a registered lobbyist on behalf of the government of Ethiopia.

== Early life and education ==
José Antonio Garcia, Jr. was born in Miami Beach, Florida to José Garcia, Sr. and his wife, Carmen. His parents fled Cuba after the Cuban Revolution occurred and Fidel Castro's Communist regime took power. Garcia graduated in 1982 from Belen Jesuit Preparatory School, where he participated in the Close Up Washington civic education program. Garcia attended Miami-Dade Community College before earning his Bachelor of Arts degree in political science and public affairs from the University of Miami in 1987. While at the university, Garcia was elected president of the student government. He earned his J.D. from the University of Miami School of Law in 1991.

== Early career ==
Garcia served on the Florida Public Service Commission as chairman. While on the FPSC, he chaired the National Association of Regulatory Utility Commissioners and was second vice chair of the Southeastern Association of Regulatory Utility Commissioners. Garcia was later appointed to the Federal Communications Commission Federal-State Joint Board on Universal Service and was a member of the National Association of Latino Elected and Appointed Officials.

Garcia served on the board of the Spanish American League Against Discrimination (SALAD) and on the board of directors of Regis House, a drug addiction treatment and prevention center for inner-city youth in Miami.

=== Early politics ===
He became a member of the board of directors of the Cuban American National Foundation, and a past president. He has served as director of the New Democrat Network Hispanic Strategy Center.

In 1993 Garcia ran for the Miami-Dade County Commission for District 11, making the run-off against Miguel Diaz de la Portilla in a close race Diaz de la Portilla beat Garcia 51%-48%.

In 2006, Garcia was elected chairman of the Miami-Dade County Democratic Party, assuming the position in January 2007.

In 2009, Garcia joined the Obama administration in a Senate-confirmed position as director of the Office of Minority Economic Impact in the United States Department of Energy. During his tenure at the energy department, Garcia was appointed by President Obama to the Task Force on Puerto Rico's Status.

== U.S. House of Representatives ==
=== Elections ===
==== 2008 ====
On February 7, 2008, Garcia announced his candidacy for the U.S. Congress in Florida's 25th congressional district. Garcia's campaign raised over $1.8 million, but incumbent Republican U.S. Congressman Mario Díaz-Balart defeated Garcia 53%-47%. This 6% lost is easily the closest that a Democrat has come to defeating one of the Díaz-Balart brothers in a Congressional election.

==== 2010 ====
In April 2010, Garcia announced his candidacy for the 25th district again, after U.S. Congressman Mario Díaz-Balart announced that he would run for reelection in the 21st District being vacated by his brother, Lincoln Díaz-Balart. In his campaign announcement, Garcia stated that he would focus on job creation, funding education and health care as his top priorities. Garcia defeated Luis Meurice in the Democratic primary, 76%-24%.

In the general election, Garcia faced State Representative David Rivera, Tea Party activist Jose 'Roly' Arrojo, and Florida Whig Party nominee Craig Porter. Rivera defeated Garcia, 52%-43%, or a 9.5-point margin.

==== 2012 ====
In 2012, Garcia announced he would seek a rematch against Rivera in what was now the 26th district. The district had been pushed well to the east and south, losing its share of Collier County and picking up all of Monroe County, including the Keys. The race was widely expected to be much closer than in previous cycles. Not only was it more evenly divided between Democrats and Republicans than its predecessor, but Rivera's campaign was hobbled by numerous scandals. In addition to several state probes, Rivera was the target of a federal investigation into allegations he tried to sabotage the Democratic primary in the 26th by secretly funding an unknown candidate, Justin Lamar Sternad, in hopes of avoiding a rematch against García. Several vendors whom Sternad employed in his campaign told the Miami Herald that Rivera had funded Sternad's campaign. Sternad himself subsequently told the FBI that Rivera had funded his campaign. Sternad's campaign manager, Ana Alliegro, was a close friend of Rivera's and, according to Sternad, had served as the go-between.

Garcia won the rematch, defeating Rivera 54%–43%. He was the first Hispanic Democrat to represent Florida in Congress in over a century and, until 2023, was the only Cuban-American Democrat to do so.

In May 2013, Garcia's chief-of-staff and top political strategist went to jail after being implicated in a sophisticated scheme to manipulate the previous year’s primary elections by submitting hundreds of fraudulent absentee-ballot requests.

==== 2014 ====
García ran for re-election to the U.S. House in 2014. He faced Republican nominee Carlos Curbelo in the general election on November 4, 2014. According to a Washington Post article in December 2012, Garcia was one of the 10 most vulnerable incumbents in 2014. He was a member of the Democratic Congressional Campaign Committee's Frontline Program, designed to help protect vulnerable Democratic incumbents heading into the 2014 election. Nonetheless, Garcia lost to the Republican nominee Carlos Curbelo, 51.5% to 48.5%.

==== 2016 ====
in the 2016 election, Garcia ran again to reclaim his seat but was defeated by Curbelo, 53% to 41%.

=== Committee assignments ===
- Committee on the Judiciary
  - Subcommittee on Immigration Policy and Border Security
  - Subcommittee on Regulatory Reform, Commercial and Antitrust Law
- Committee on Natural Resources
  - Subcommittee on Energy and Mineral Resources
  - Subcommittee on Fisheries, Wildlife, Oceans and Insular Affairs
  - Subcommittee on Public Lands and Environmental Regulation

== Political positions ==
Garcia was sworn into his first two-year term on January 3, 2013. Despite the urging of several political and media organizations as well as prominent leaders, Garcia refused to disclose any of his stances for the 2012 Political Courage Test.

=== Abortion ===
Garcia supports abortion rights and has voted against legislation that would prohibit organizations that perform abortions from receiving federal funds.

=== Cuba ===
Garcia joined other Cuban-American lawmakers in submitting a letter to the State Department calling for Cuba to remain a designated state-sponsor of terrorism. And in a Sept. 19 letter, he joined with the other three Cuban-American House members by raising concerns over the regime's involvement in selling art at a Houston art fair.

Garcia endorses the political construct that the U.S. continue to allow Cuban Americans to travel to Cuba to visit family, and that other Americans to go there for "purposeful travel", such as educational tours and religious missions.

Garcia supported the application of a Havana-based research institute to get a license from the U.S. Treasury Department to test and market a diabetes treatment in the United States. Critics claim the license could weaken the embargo and eventually lead to giving Cuba access to American markets without political reform.

=== Gay marriage ===
García supports same-sex marriage. He was one of 172 congresspeople who joined an amicus brief sent to the Supreme Court to declare the Defense of Marriage Act unconstitutional.

=== Health care ===
Garcia opposes repealing the 2010 Affordable Care Act.

=== Privacy ===
Garcia voted against the Amash Amendment, which would have prohibited the collection of records by the National Security Agency under the Patriot Act.

=== Economy ===
Garcia voted for the Farm Bill, a $1 trillion bill expanding crop insurance for farmers by $7 billion over the next decade and creating new subsidies for rice and peanut growers, but which made cuts to the food stamp program by an average of $90 per month for 1.7 million people in 15 states.

=== Energy ===
García supports developing renewable and alternative sources of energy. He opposes offshore drilling, and opposes any offshore energy production, hoping to develop energy industries on shore.

=== Immigration reform ===
Garcia is the chief sponsor in the House of Representatives of a comprehensive immigration reform plan which is similar to legislation that has passed the United States Senate. If enacted, the plan would create a pathway to legalized permanent residency for millions of undocumented aliens living and working in the United States.

=== Flood insurance ===
In January 2014, Garcia proposed legislation that would halt flood insurance rate hikes for five years. His efforts stem from previous legislation that once in place would hit 268,000 Floridians with rate increases of between 20 and 400 percent. The Miami Herald reported that the bill would apply to all "property owners covered by the National Florida Insurance Program, and provides the greatest relief to those hardest hit—including an estimated 47,000 in Miami-Dade County."

== Controversy ==
=== 2010 candidate funding ===
On September 9, 2013, the Miami Herald reported the funding of a shill candidate during Garcia's 2010 campaign. His campaign reportedly secretly funded Jose 'Roly' Arrojo, as a "Tea Party" general-election candidate, in an effort to siphon votes from the other Republican candidate, David Rivera. Arrojo had spent thousands of dollars on mailers and a $10,440 qualifying fee without having ever filed the necessary paperwork with the Federal Election Commission. Vendors employed in the Arrojo campaign told the Miami Herald that Garcia had funded Arrojo's campaign and that they were cooperating with federal authorities in the investigation. He was sentenced to two years probation with eight months of home confinement and a $1,000 fine.

=== 2012 absentee ballot scheme ===
In February 2013, the Miami Herald began reporting about "high-tech" hackers who had managed to make fraudulent ballot requests for the August 2012 primary election. On July 7, 2012, the first of more than 2,500 absentee ballot requests began streaming in from voters who had not requested a ballot. The Miami Herald investigation into hundreds of fraudulent ballot requests prompted prosecutors to reopen the case. It was discovered that the fake ballot requests originated from masked Internet Protocol addresses in Miami. The investigation would conclude that Congressman Garcia’s staff had been behind the hundreds of fraudulent absentee-ballot requests.

Of the three staff members involved, Jefferey Garcia (no relation), had served as campaign manager to the Congressman during his 2010 bid for the District 26 seat, and later as his chief of staff. Jefferey Garcia pled guilty and was sentenced to 90 days in jail for orchestrating the fraudulent ballot scheme.

=== Lobbying on behalf of the Ethiopian government ===
In 2021, Garcia became a lobbyist on behalf of the government of Ethiopia as part of Mercury Public Affairs, a lobbying firm owned by Omnicom Group. Garcia was hired to lobby through the American Ethiopian Public Affairs Committee (AEPAC), which has been endorsed by Ethiopian ambassador Fitsum Arega. A copy of Garcia's contract stated that the firm will provide “government relations and media relations consulting and management services” on behalf of Prime Minister Abiy Ahmed’s government. Ahmed has been accused of abetting genocide in the Tigray region, and Garcia has reportedly lobbied alongside former Senator David Vitter on congressional legislation in response to the War in Tigray.

== See also ==
- List of Hispanic and Latino Americans in the United States Congress

U.S. House of Representatives
Preceded by David Rivera; Redistricted	Member of the U.S. House of Representatives from Florida's 26th congressional district 2013–2013	Succeeded by Carlos Curbelo
U.S. order of precedence (ceremonial)
Preceded by Allen West as Former U.S. Representative	Order of precedence of the United States as Former U.S. Representative	Succeeded by David Jolly as Former U.S. Representative
