= Manuel Tarrazo =

Fashion designer, TV presenter and actor

- Born: Santo Domingo, Dominican Republic
- Television: Aquí se habla español
- Manuel Tarrazo on Twitter
- Manuel Tarrazo on Instagram

Manuel Alejandro Tarrazo Lama (born 1989) is a fashion designer, TV presenter and actor from the Dominican Republic.

In 2006, Manuel Tarrazo acted in the film La Tragedia Llenas: Un Código 666, based on actual events, playing the role of José R. Llenas-Aybar, a boy from an upper middle class family who was murdered.

Tarrazo Lama studied fashion design in the Istituto Marangoni, a fashion school at Milan, Italy. Tarrazo designs footwear for both men and women. In 2009, he presented his first collection in the República Dominicana Fashion Week '09.

== Career ==
Television

- "Aquí Se Habla Español" (201?–present)

Filmography

| Year | Title | Character | Director | Country |
|---|---|---|---|---|
| 2006 | La Tragedia Llenas: Un Código 666 | José Rafael Llenas Aybar | Elías Acosta | (Dominican Republic) |
