= Board of Open Schooling and Skill Education =

Indian school examination board

- Abbreviation: BOSSE
- Formation: 2020
- Type: Open School Board of India
- Legal status: Active
- Headquarters: Sikkim, Gangtok, India
- Official language: Hindi; English
- Website: www.bosse.ac.in

The Board of Open Schooling and Skill Education (BOSSE), is the board of open schooling recognized by the Government of Sikkim in India. BOSSE is established under the act of the Board of Open Schooling and Skill Education; Sikkim Act 2020 was passed on 21 September 2020 by the Sikkim Legislative Assembly stated under Act No. 14 of 2020. The state government of Sikkim has created a mechanism through BOSSE to provide for secondary education, senior secondary as well as skill and vocational education up to pre-degree level and to provide opportunity to continue education to such students who have missed the opportunity of school education. The BOSSE is a state open school board that administers examinations for secondary and senior secondary examinations similar to the NIOS, CBSE and the CISCE. BOSSE offers a unique platform where students may choose skill and vocational subjects along with their secondary and senior secondary papers. The board is mandated to promote open schooling and to undertake research, innovation and development activities in the area of open schooling to strengthen the open and distance education system.

== Events ==
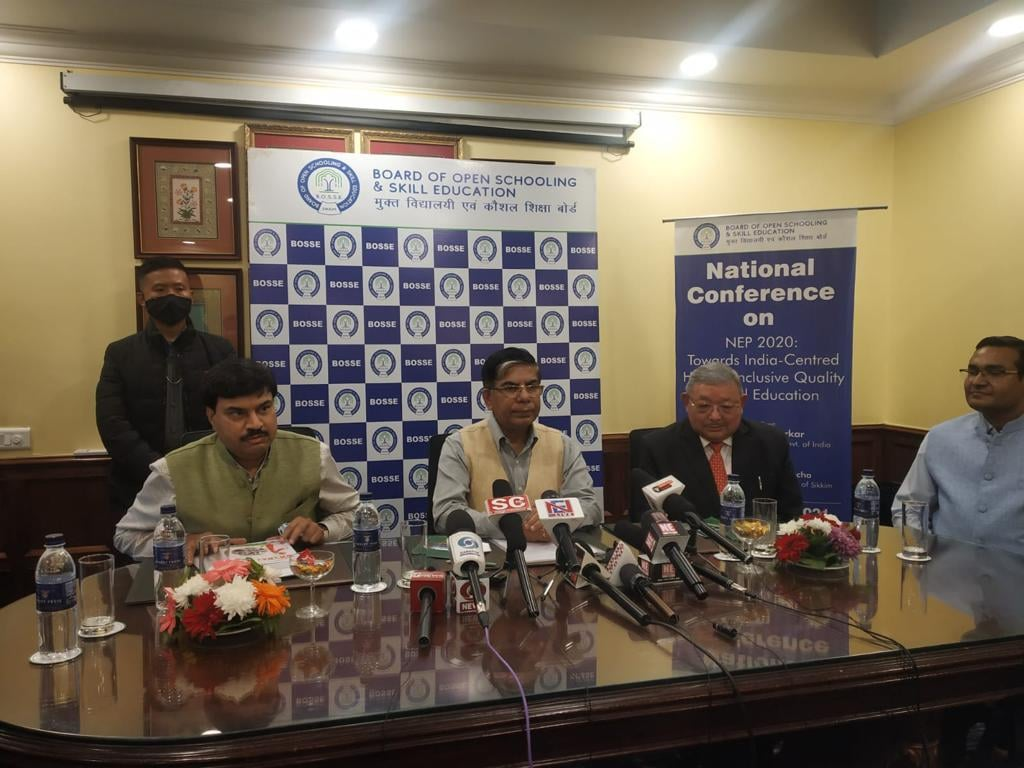

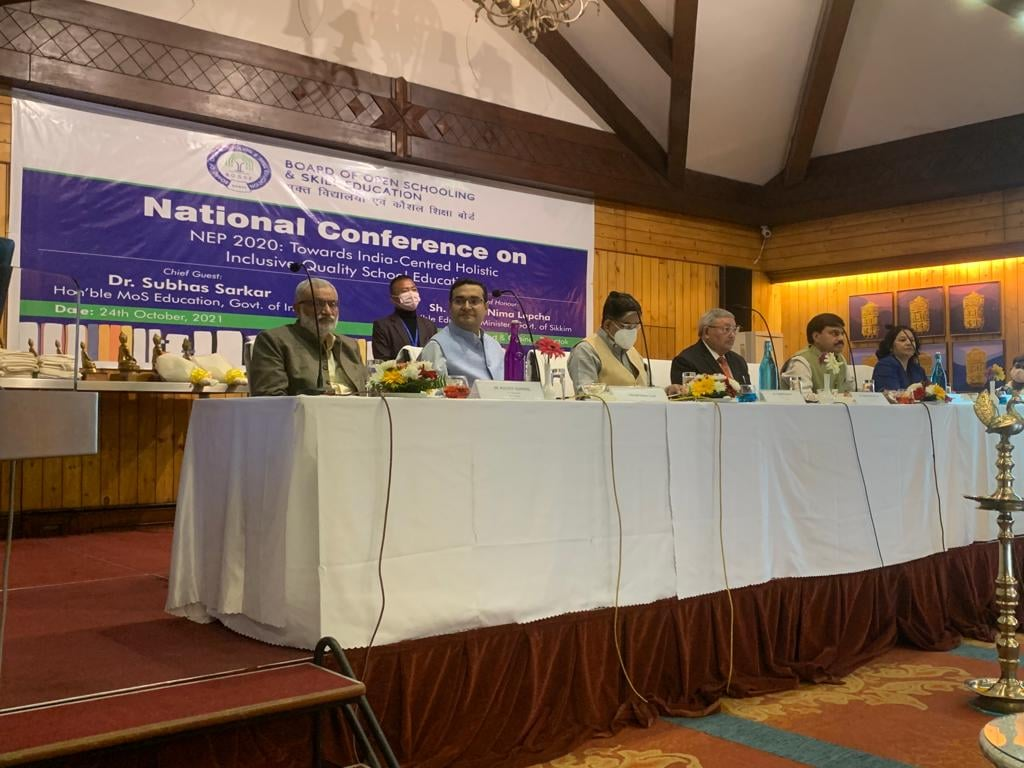

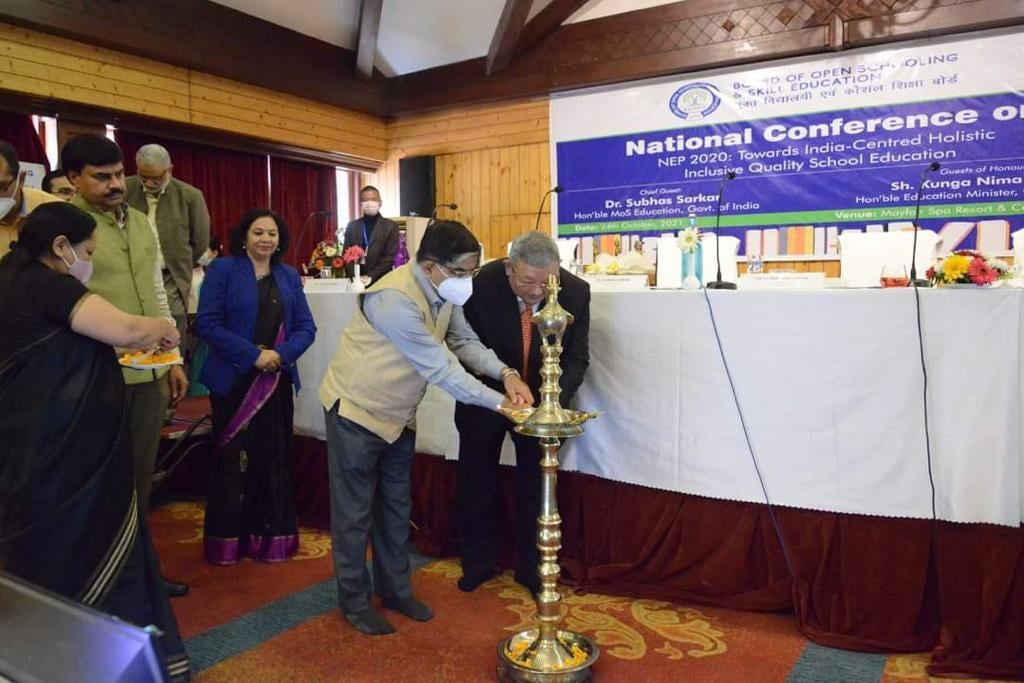

- BOSSE Sikim organized a national conference, "NEP 2020: Towards India-Centred Holistic Inclusive Quality School Education", on its first foundation day held at Sikkim.
- Together with Global Rainbow Foundation (GRF), BOSSE Sikim jointly organized a one-day international conference, "Educating, Enabling, and Empowering Divyangjan (Differently Abled Persons with Special Needs): Issues and Challenges" at UNESCO Delhi on 20 August 2022.
- FICCI has been a part of the "School Education Conference 2022"; BOSSE in association with FICCI took part in the "School Education Conference 2022" held on 9 & 10 December 2022 at Delhi to promote the "STUDENT FIRST" initiative.
- BW Leadership Summit 2023 on 18 January 2023.

== Courses offered ==
BOSSE offer the following courses which includes the following three levels:

- Secondary level
- Senior secondary level
- Skill and vocation education

== Salient features ==
- Transfer of credit up to two subjects
- Dual/part-time admission
- On-demand examinations
- Public examination twice a year
- Combination of vocational subjects with academics

== Examinations ==
BOSSE conducts its examinations twice a year in April–May and October–November on dates fixed by the board. However, candidate may also choose transfer of credit/on-demand examination at the time of admission at the secondary and senior secondary level. Results of the public examinations are announced usually six weeks after the last date of examinations.
