= David Rivera =

American politician (born 1965)

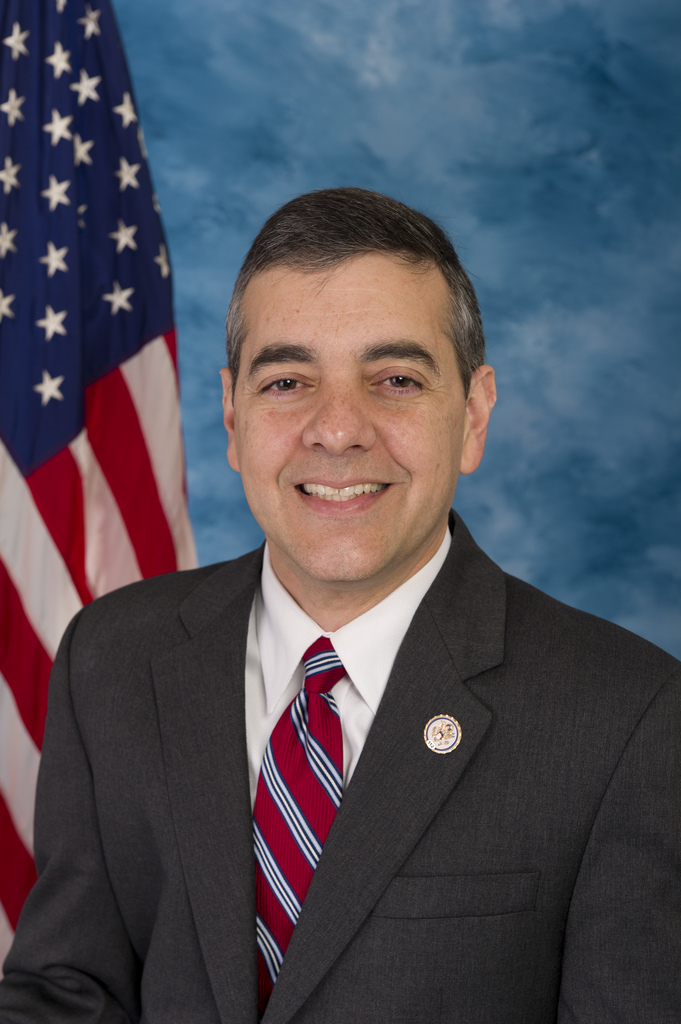
- Official portrait, c. 2011

Member of the U.S. House of Representatives from Florida's 25th district
- In office January 3, 2011 – January 3, 2013
- Preceded by: Mario Díaz-Balart
- Succeeded by: Joe Garcia (redistricted)

Member of the Florida House of Representatives from the 112th district
- In office November 5, 2002 – November 2, 2010
- Preceded by: Mario Díaz-Balart
- Succeeded by: Jeanette Nuñez

Personal details
- Born: David Mauricio Rivera; September 16, 1965 (age 61) New York City, U.S.
- Party: Republican
- Spouse: Safiya Prysmakova
- Education: Florida International University (BA, MPA)

David Mauricio Rivera (born September 16, 1965) is an American politician from Florida. He was a member of the Florida House of Representatives from 2002 to 2010 and a member of the U.S. House of Representatives for one term, representing Florida's 25th congressional district from 2011 to 2013. He is a member of the Republican Party.

Rivera was arrested on December 5, 2022, and charged with failure to register as a foreign agent and money laundering conspiracy. He was sentenced to 10 years in prison on October 2, 2026.

== Early life, education, and early career ==
Rivera was born in New York City in the borough of Brooklyn on September 16, 1965, and moved to Florida in 1974. Both his father, a cab driver, and his mother Daisy, a driving instructor, had fled Cuba after the political rise of Fidel Castro. He graduated from Miami Christian High School. He earned a Bachelor of Arts degree with honors in political science from Florida International University in 1986 and a Master of Public Administration in 1994.

After college, Rivera worked as a public affairs director for the Valladares Foundation, which focused on human rights in Cuba.

== Florida House of Representatives ==
In 2002, he ran for Florida's 112th House of Representatives district. He defeated Ray Gonzalez in the Republican primary, 52–48%. He won the general election unopposed. He won re-election unopposed in 2004, 2006, and 2008.

In the Florida House, Rivera chaired the rules committee before serving as chairman of the appropriations committee from 2009 to 2010, where he pushed to create new professional schools at FIU and helped the Miami-Dade delegation work within a tight state budget. “We are all geared toward finding cost savings,” he explained to the Herald. Alongside his support for tax-free back-to-school shopping holidays, Rivera sponsored a measure forbidding places of higher education in Florida from sponsoring and paying for research trips to Cuba. And it was Cuba, perhaps more than any other issue that emerged as Rivera’s main issue concern in Tallahassee: "It’s the most important issue to me," he said in the winter of 2004. "I think every Cuban American from whatever walk of life has a moral obligation to continue the cause of a free and Democratic Cuba."

In addition to his legislative office, he has served the Republican Party as state committeeman for the Republican Party of Florida and as the executive director for the Republican Party of Miami-Dade County.

== U.S. House of Representatives ==
=== Elections ===
2010

In January 2009, Rivera filed to run for the state senate seat being vacated by J. Alex Villalobos. However, when neighboring U.S. Congressman Lincoln Díaz-Balart decided not to run for another term in 2010, his brother, U.S. Congressman Mario Díaz-Balart, opted to run for a new term in Lincoln's district rather than his current one. This created an opening in the seat and prompted Rivera to announce he would run for Florida's 25th congressional district on February 25, 2010. On August 24, he won the Republican primary with 63% of the vote. On November 2, Rivera defeated Democratic nominee Joe Garcia 52%–43%.

2012

Redistricting resulted in Rivera's district being renumbered as the 26th district. It lost its share of Collier County and picked up the Florida Keys, as well as portions of Miami-Dade County. While the old 25th leaned Republican, the new 26th is more of a swing district and is equally split between Democrats and Republicans. In a rematch from 2010, Garcia defeated Rivera 54%–43%.

=== Committee assignments ===
- Committee on Foreign Affairs
  - Subcommittee on Oversight and Investigations
  - Subcommittee on the Western Hemisphere
- Committee on Natural Resources
  - Subcommittee on Energy and Mineral Resources
  - Subcommittee on National Parks, Forests and Public Lands

== Later career ==
In May 2014, Rivera announced he would run for Congress again. He was defeated in the Republican primary, coming in fourth place with 7.5% of the vote.

In March 2016, Rivera announced he would run for the open state house district 118, but lost to Democrat Robert Asencio by 53 votes. In March 2017, Rivera announced he would run for the state house again in 2018, this time in neighboring district 105.

=== Funding a straw candidate ===
In April 2012, Rivera initiated a scheme to secretly fund candidate Justin Lamar Sternad in the Democratic primary as a way to weaken his eventual 2012 general election opponent, Joe Garcia, when he met with his associate, Miami campaign consultant Ana Sol Alliegro, and directed her to approach Sternad with an offer to provide financial support to his primary campaign. At Rivera’s direction, Alliegro spent the next few months acting as an intermediary, transmitting funds to Sternad, the Sternad political action committee, and vendors providing services to Sternad’s committee. Rivera funneled nearly $76,000 to the Democratic ringer candidate.

The Federal Election Commission (FEC) accused Rivera of illegally making contributions in the name of another person when he made multiple cash payments to third-party vendors providing services to the Sternad campaign from July 14, 2012, to August 8, 2012. Rivera also took steps to hide his identity and directed others not to disclose him as the true source of those cash payments, the FEC complaint stated. Rivera's activity was also the subject of an investigation by the U.S. Attorney’s Office of Southern Florida. Sternad and Alliegro pleaded guilty to criminal charges for their roles in the scheme.

On March 24, 2022, a federal judge ruled against his appeal of the $456,000 judgment against him tied to his federal elections campaign violations. It was one of the 15 largest fines ever handed down by the FEC.

=== Arrest and charges ===
On December 5, 2022, Rivera was arrested and charged with conspiracy to launder money and with failing to register as a foreign agent, the latter a violation of the Foreign Agents Registration Act (FARA). He was allegedly a lobbyist for Venezuela, promoting the normalization of relations between Venezuela and the United States.

On December 15, 2023, additional charges were added to the indictment against Rivera for three tax crimes. The U.S. Department of Justice has claimed Rivera allegedly received over $5.5 million for efforts to lobby officials on behalf of the sanctioned Venezuelan businessman Raúl Gorrín.

On October 2, 2026, Rivera was sentenced to 10 years in prison. "As a part of his sentence, Rivera, who served in Congress from 2011-13, must also forfeit his Florida properties."

== See also ==
- List of Hispanic and Latino Americans in the United States Congress
- List of federal political scandals in the United States

U.S. House of Representatives
| Preceded by Mario Díaz-Balart | Member of the U.S. House of Representatives from Florida's 25th congressional district 2011–2013 | Succeeded by Mario Díaz-Balart |
U.S. order of precedence (ceremonial)
| Preceded by Sandy Adams as Former U.S. Representative | Order of precedence of the United States as Former U.S. Representative | Succeeded by Allen West as Former U.S. Representative |
