= Örgryte New Church =

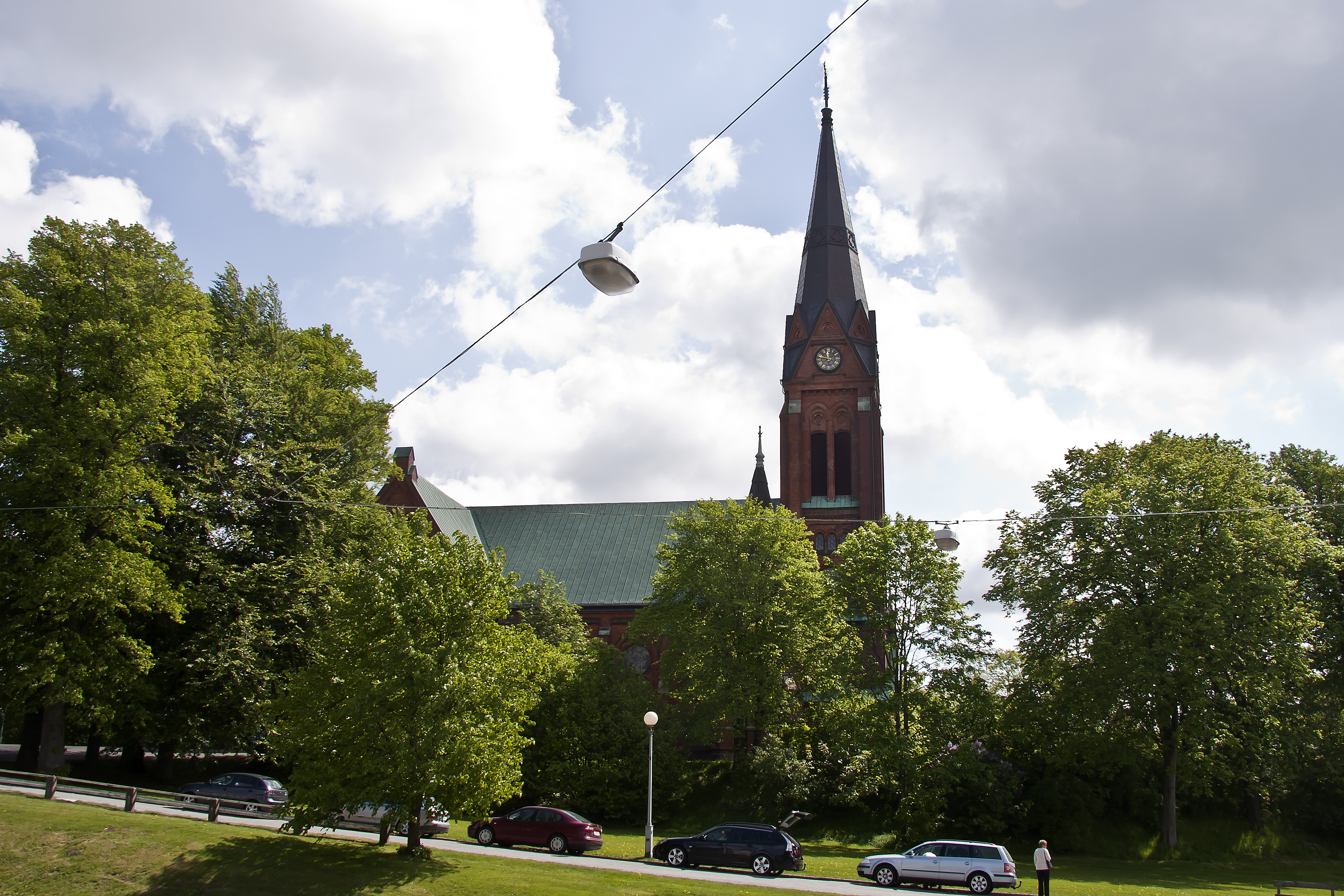
- Örgryte New Church in May 2011

- Location in Sweden
- 57°42′10″N 12°00′19″E
- Location: Gothenburg
- Country: Sweden
- Denomination: Church of Sweden

History
- Consecrated: 6 July 1890

Architecture
- Style: Gothic
- Groundbreaking: 1888

Administration
- Archdiocese: Diocese of Gothenburg

Örgryte New Church (Swedish: Örgryte nya kyrka) is a Gothic-style church located within the Örgryte congregation (Swedish: Örgryte församling) in Gothenburg, Sweden.

== History ==
Beginning in 1870, the churchgoers of Örgryte began planning a major project because their existing 400-seat church could no longer accommodate the growing congregation. In 1885, under the leadership of Reverend Magnus Ekberg, plans for a new church were proposed. Donations were collected, and the church took out a loan of SEK 50,000 to meet the estimated costs. Among the donors were merchant David Lundstrom of Underås farm, James Dickson, David Carnegie, and Oscar Ekman. The new brick church was designed to seat over 1,000 people, about than twice that of the previous one. To ensure a stable foundation, the church was built on Svalberget. Local brewer JW Lyckholm of Skår financed two of its bells, Captain Pontus Virgin of Kålltorp paid for the altar, while the stained glass windows were donated by the wholesaler Peter Hammarberg.

The architect was Adrian C. Peterson, and the builder was F.O. Peterson. Work began in the summer of 1888, and the church was consecrated on July 6, 1890 by bishop Edvard Rodhe. The final cost was 226,000 SEK, with donations covering slightly more than 120,000 SEK. The remaining amount was funded partially through the church's loan of SEK 50,000.

The church was built in red Börringe Brick from Skåne, and it did not have electricity until 1908. The facades have rich tegelornering, stone moldings, and forgings.

Due to the constraints of the site, the church is oriented northeast to southwest. It features a cruciform layout with exposed rafters and vaulted pentagonal chancels. The bell tower stands nearly 60 meters (197 feet) tall.

An intense restoration took place in 1937 under a Forsséns line, and the pulpit was moved. In 1952, four painted circular windows of the chancel were transferred to the stands, while other painted korfönster (stained glass) from 1889.

== Church organs ==
The church has two organs:

- Willis organ, originally built c. 1871 for St. Stephen's Church in Hampstead, London by Henry Willis, who was the leading organ-builder in England from 1850. When the church in Hampstead was closed in 1971, the organ was disassembled and sold to the Netherlands. In 1992, the Academy of Music in Gothenburg learned of the instrument, after which it was purchased by Tostareds Organ Factory in 1998 by the Örgryte Assembly Organ Foundation. The organ is the largest Victorian organ by a British manufacture in Sweden.
- The North German Baroque organ, built as part of extensive research at the University of Gothenburg and Chalmers. It was constructed at the GOArt (Göteborg Organ Art Center) workshop under the leadership of Mats Arvidsson, Henk van Eeken, and Munetaka Yokota. The instrument has four manuals and pedal with 54 stops distributed. The goal had been to recreate a North German baroque organ, the Arp Schnitger (1648–1719).

== The church bells ==
The church tower has two bells, each with the inscription:

The Oscar II government when Dr. E.H.
Rodhe was a bishop in the Diocese of Gothenburg and
Dean J.M. Ekberg vicar of Örgryte
Became the bell cast at Eriksbergs
Mech. Werkstad in 1899 the factory owner
J. W. Lyckholms expense.

The larger bell has the inscription:

Come, for all things are now ready. Luc. 14:17
Tacker Lord into his gates
Lofver him in his yard
Come here from all locations
Prices on about us, care
For he is the good and gentle
Keeps faith forever.

And the smaller one reads:

It's a kostelig things to thank the Lord
And lofsjunga your name to most high
The morning proclaim your mercy
And the evening your truth. Psalm 92:2,3
Glory to the Father and His Son
The holy spirit in the throne
Holy trinity
Be praised and praise forever.

== Altarpiece ==
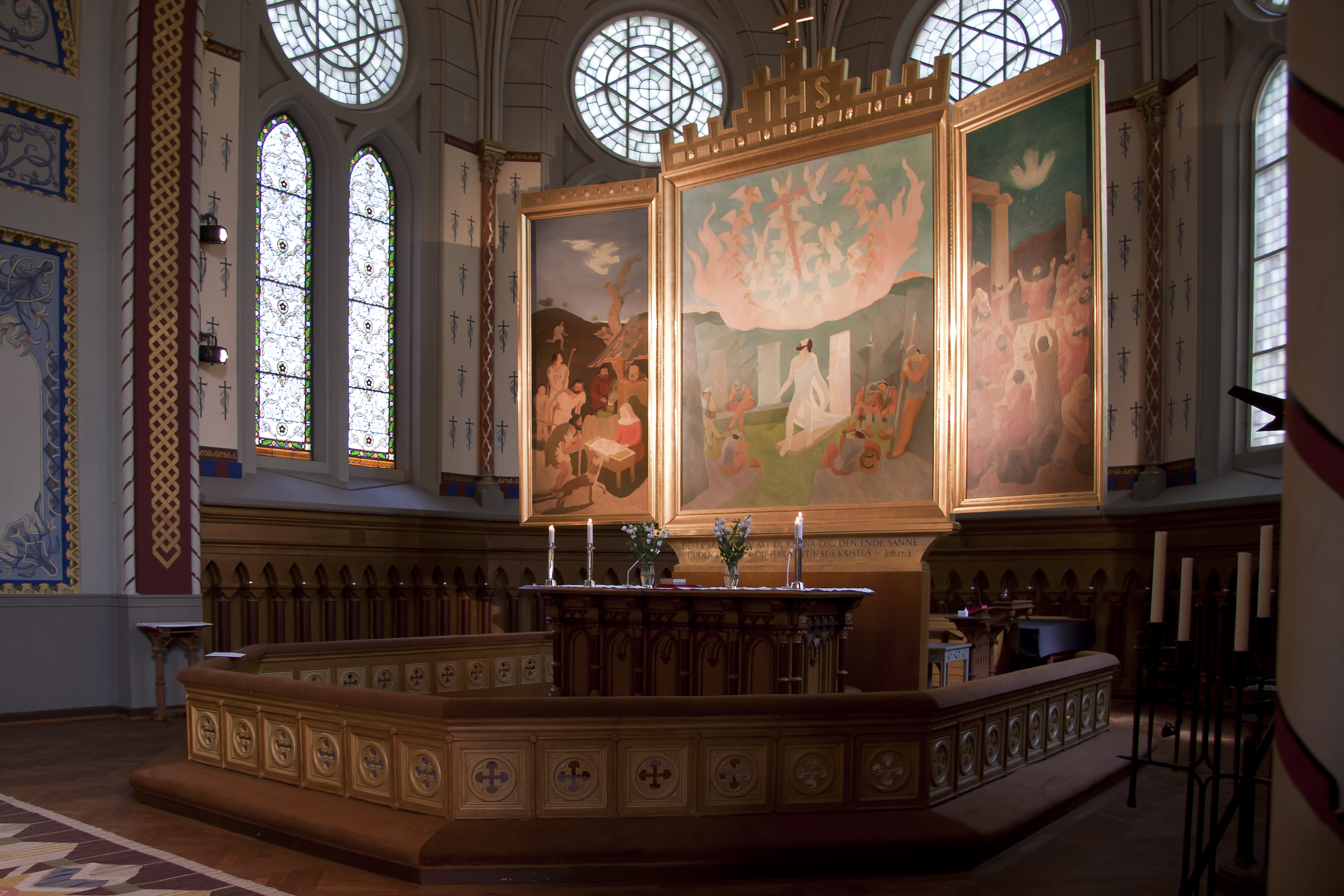

In 1950, the church painter Thor Fagerkvist (1884–1960) was commissioned to paint an altarpiece for the church. It would replace Carl Johan Dyfverman's crucifixion group from 1890. It was a triptych consisting of five oil paintings on canvas, three of which are usually visible with pictures related to Christmas, Easter and Pentecost, while the cabinet is closed during Lent, and then shows the other two paintings, photographed wagon and no Gethsemane. The frame was designed by architect Axel Forssén.

The old altar

The great altar of cut oak wood was placed in the sanctuary of the church in 1890 and is the work of Dyfverman. The subject is the crucified Jesus with Mary Magdalene, the other Mary and the disciple John, beneath the cross. The sculpture was painted in 1923, and in 1969, it was restored by artwork conservator Torsten Öhlén. The crucifixion group was moved in 1951 to its current location in the transept.

== Altar ==
A crucifix made of ivory and ebony stands on the altar. The crucifix was created in 1952 by the Gothenburg based sculptor Henry Johansson.

== Font ==
The baptismal font was designed by architect Axel Forssén. Dean Ekberg's successor, Reverend Magnus Nilman (1855–1927), donated it along with dopfatet of copper to the new church in 1927, when was returned while the maroon kalkstensfunten to the old church.
