= David Higgs =

American organist

David Higgs is an American organist. He has given a large number of recitals and is the head of the organ department at the Eastman School of Music.

== Life ==
Higgs earned his B.M. and M.M. at the Manhattan School of Music in New York City, with a Performer's Certificate following from Eastman. He was on the faculty at Manhattan from 1983–86 and was Associate Organist of Riverside Church in New York, where he also conducted the Riverside Choral Society. He then moved to the San Francisco area to join the faculty of the Church Divinity School of the Pacific. In 1992, he moved to Rochester, NY, where he joined the faculty at Eastman. He is now the chair of the Organ and Historical Keyboards Department at Eastman, and continues to serve as a professor of organ.

== Discography ==
- Bach at Bryn Mawr
- Inaugural Recital (of the Fisk op. 100 at the Meyerson Symphony Center, Dallas)
- Double Forte, with Todd Wilson
- David Higgs at Riverside
- Eastman Italian Baroque Organ, with Hans Davidsson and William Porter
- The Craighead-Saunders Organ, with Hans Davidsson and William Porter
