= Lamar Sternad =

American hotel administrator

Justin Lamar Sternad
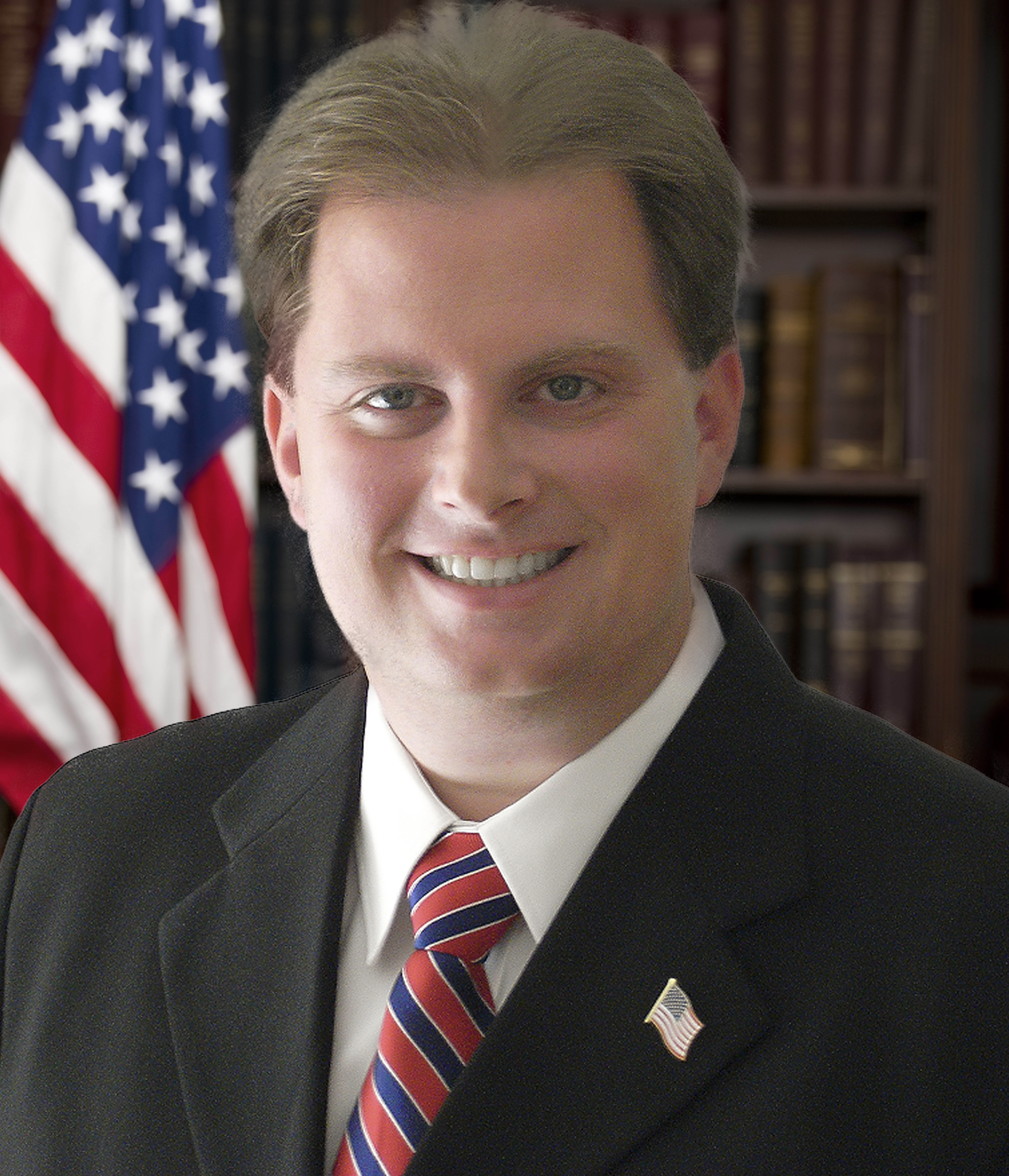
- Former Congressional Candidate FL-26 Justin Lamar Sternad.

Personal details
- Born: April 18, 1977 (age 49) Omaha, Nebraska, U.S.
- Party: Democratic
- Education: Bellevue East High School; Miami Dade College (A.S.)
- Profession: Hospitality Management
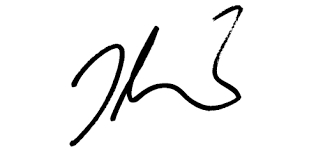
- Signature

Lamar Sternad (born Justin Lamar Sternad on April 18, 1977) is an American hotel administrator and a former Democratic primary candidate for Florida's 26th congressional district. Incumbent freshman Republican Congressman David Rivera had qualified to run in the general election for District 26.

== Early life, education and career ==
Sternad was born in Omaha, Nebraska, to James K. and Sandra J. Sternad. Sternad attended high school in Bellevue, Nebraska. He graduated from Miami Dade College in 2003. While attending college, Sternad worked as a hotel manager. He became part of an executive transition team assembled by Driftwood Hospitality, LLC to conduct a multi-million-dollar renovation and re-branding of an aging Dadeland-area hotel into a new boutique concept by Intercontinental Hotels Group.

== 2012 Florida congressional campaign ==
Sternad announced his candidacy in Cutler Bay, Florida on November 14, 2011. Sternad was one of many candidates who qualified to run on the ballot in the 2012 primary election for the U.S. House, representing Florida's newly drawn 26th District.

== Campaign themes and issues ==
Sternad made jobs creation, the economy and Social Security key issues in his campaign. Sternad had pledged the following if elected as US Representative:

- Putting Americans back to work by investing in the revitalization of infrastructure
- Regulatory reform, investment, and tax cuts to help small business start-up and growth
- Closure of tax loopholes that allow corporations to hide profits outside of the country
- Tougher review and removal of tax incentives that encourage corporations who outsource American jobs overseas
- Ensuring that Social Security would remain solvent by removal of the Payroll Tax Cap, opposing privatizing, opposing benefit cuts and Increase contributions and reduction of benefits for high-earners
- Support our brave men and women in the armed forces
- Improve the quality of education and provide for our educators and schools alike
- Advocate Healthcare reform
- Protect our environment here in South Florida and move us forward toward kinder, greener energy sources

== Elections ==
=== 2012 ===
Sternad ran in the U.S. Congress elections, 2012 primary election for chance to represent Florida's 26th Congressional District. Sternad sought the nomination on the Democratic ticket. The primary elections were held on August 14, 2012. Sternad was defeated by Joe Garcia in the Democratic primary on August 14, 2012. Sternad placed third having garnered 11% of the vote.

== Controversy ==
=== Campaign finance scandal ===
During the primary stage of the 2012 election season, the Miami Herald and El Nuevo Herald were alerted to discrepancies in Sternad's campaign finance reports by Jefferey Garcia, chief-of-staff and top political strategist for Congressman Joe Garcia. Beginning in August 2012, the newspapers' coverage of Sternad's alleged campaign funding crimes also brought former Republican Congressman David Rivera, who reportedly helped finance mailers attacking Sternad's primary opponent Joe Garcia, among other expensive maneuvers executed by the Sternad campaign, to the attention of federal law enforcement authorities. Garcia ultimately defeated Rivera in the general election on November 6, 2012. Subsequent investigations by the FBI and the Federal Election Commission resulted in Sternad being charged with conspiracy to defraud the United States and concealing the source of unreported campaign funds. Sternad surrendered to FBI agents on February 22, 2013 as part of his cooperation with federal authorities. An FBI and grand jury investigation are exploring Rivera's involvement in the scheme. According to the Miami Herald, this is due to the missing testimony of Rivera's close friend as well as Sternad's campaign manager, Ana Alliegro. Alliegro went underground after failing to show up to her meeting with the FBI in September 2012 in which she would have been required to explain eyewitness accounts alleging she funneled the cash from Rivera to Sternad's campaign. Ana Alliegro was later discovered cutting hair in Nicaragua. She was arrested and extradited back to the United States and placed in federal custody. During a routine "calendar call" hearing preceding Alliegro's trial, Alliegro plead guilty to four felony counts. She would later be sentenced to split sentence consisting of six months' prison and six months' house arrest followed by two years of probation.

After a year of continuances in Sternad's sentencing, Federal Judge Cecilia M. Altonaga sentenced Sternad in Federal Court on July 10, 2014 to seven months in prison followed by one year of probation. Following Sternad's extensive cooperation and Ana Alliegro's guilty plea in this scandal, Federal prosecutors asked for a reduction in Sternad's sentence. In consideration of Sternad's ongoing cooperation with the Federal Government, Federal Judge Cecilia M. Altonaga reduced Sternad's sentence in Federal Court on September 19, 2014 to thirty days in prison and three months' home confinement to be followed by one year of probation.

== Additional sources ==
- Ballotpedia contributors,"Lamar Sternad." Ballotpedia, An Interactive Almanac of U.S. Politics,"Lamar Sternad" Retrieved July 9, 2012.
- Caputo, Marc (April 30, 2012). "NRCC rallying around David Rivera" The Miami Herald, Naked Politics Blog. Retrieved June 9, 2012.
- Maddow, Rachel (September 28, 2012). The Rachel Maddow Show, MSNBC. Retrieved September 28, 2012
- Matthews, Chris (October 1, 2012). Hardball with Chris Matthews, MSNBC. Retrieved October 1, 2012
- Moos, Jeanne (September 27, 2012). The Situation Room, CNN. Retrieved September 28, 2012
