= Calendar call =

A calendar call is an occasion where a court requires attorneys representing different matters to appear before the court so that trials and other proceedings can be scheduled so as not to conflict with one another.

Although typically a mundane event, attorneys on opposite sides of a lawsuit will often use the calendar call to maneuver for an advantage by pushing for a time that is nearer or further away, depending on their perception of what will be to the benefit of their client. The plaintiff pressing a lawsuit will want to resolve the matter quickly, while the defendant will want to delay the resolution for as long as possible. However, the opposite may also be true depending on several variables and specific circumstances in each case.

In most jurisdictions (and in all United States federal courts), parties to criminal trials will be called upon first to set the dates of their hearings, as the government must adhere to tighter deadlines in prosecuting crimes, in order to protect the rights of the accused.
