= Lemar (given name) =

Lemar is a given name. Notable people with the name include:

- Lemar Obika, full name of Lemar (born 1978), British singer, songwriter and producer
- Lemar Parrish (born 1947), American former footballer
- Lemar Marshall (born 1976), American footballer

== See also ==
- Lemar (surname)
- Mark Lamarr, a British comedian
