= Murder of José Rafael Llenas Aybar =

1996 child murder in the Dominican Republic

José Rafael Llenas-Aybar (1984 – 3 May 1996) was a child who went missing and was later found dead in the Dominican Republic in May 1996. His parents were José Rafael Llenas Menicucci and Ileana del Carmen Aybar Nadal. The Llenas Aybar family was affluent and considered upper-middle class, with connections to political figures and media personalities. Llenas-Aybar was the first cousin once removed of MLB player Winston Llenas, the third cousin of Dominican president Hipólito Mejía, and the third cousin of Dominican vice president Jacinto Peynado Garrigosa.

The Llenas Aybar family was affluent and considered upper-middle class. They had connections to political figures and media personalities.

Llenas Aybar was murdered by Mario José Redondo Llenas. Redondo Llenas was his first cousin. The murder of Llenas-Aybar was a high profile case in the Dominican Republic, and gaining notoriety due to its brutality. Allegedly, the family to the ambassador to Argentina in the Dominican Republic had ties to the murder. Redondo Llenas performed the murder with close friend Juan Manuel Moliné Rodríguez.

== Murder and investigation ==
=== Discovery of José Llenas Aybar's Body ===
According to Ileana Aybar, on the morning of May 3rd, 1996, Llenas Aybar called her place of work to ask for permission to attend a motorcycle exhibition in a local supermarket with his cousin, Redondo Llenas. At the time, Redondo Llenas lived across the street from Llenas Aybar. Aybar allowed it, but asked that he be back by 5 PM that afternoon. Some time later, Redondo Llenas calls Ileana Aybar to inform her he had dropped of Llenas Aybar at Sebelén Bowling Center (known as La Bolera to locals) to meet with friends. Ileana Aybar found this odd and out of character, as her son wasn't in the habit of going out without adult supervision. Worried, she made her way to Sebelén Bowling Center to retrieve her son but couldn't get a hold of him. She then made her way to the local supermarket where the motorcycle exhibition was supposedly taking place, but there was no such exhibition. Increasingly alarmed about the whereabouts of her son, she called her cousin Guillermo Moncada Aybar to aid in her search for Llenas Aybar. Family members and others close to the family volunteered for the search for Llenas Aybar, including his murderer, Redondo Llenas.

On May 4, 1996, the body of a middle to upper-class child was found in a creek, Arroyo Lebrón, located in the 24th Kilometer of Autopista Duarte, in northwest Santo Domingo, Dominican Republic. The body was in "crude" conditions, and had been bound in thick duct tape and had received thirty-four stab wounds. The body was identified as José Llenas Aybar. He was 12 years old.

=== Factors hindering investigators ===
Several factors surrounding the investigation and trial hindered the discovery of the exact motives behind the crime, the number and identity of the people involved, as well as what exactly occurred that day:

- The scene where the body was found was controlled by the authorities only after dozens of people had gone through it – some were officials but many others were individuals whose identities were never confirmed and whose motives could have ranged from simple curiosity to intentional contamination of the scene.
- The scientific value of the autopsy was compromised by the fact that it was practiced after the body had been submitted to funerary processes, causing the permanent loss of valuable evidence, including but not limited to, details regarding used weapons and number of attackers.
- The alleged murder weapon(s) was (were) never recovered.
- The clothes of the victim and of the accused went missing while in police custody, barring the opportunity for any type of forensic examination.
- Redondo Llenas alleged that police officers falsely denied the existence of audio transcripts from his interrogation while in police custody. The police argued that the recordings never existed but during the trial there was evidence, including testimony from the victim’s mother, that officers recorded at least parts of the interrogation. The content of the audio transcripts and the reason for their disappearance remain a mystery.
- Redondo Llenas alleged that Teresa Meccia’s husband, the then Argentine ambassador to the Dominican Republic, Luis Palmas de la Calzada, and son, Martin Palmas Meccia, were involved. Palmas Meccia graduated high school with Redondo Llenas and the other accused, Juan Moliné Rodriguez. Specifically, Redondo Llenas asserted that Palmas de la Calzada forced them to murder the boy under the threat that if they did not he would murder Redondo Llenas’ younger sister. Additionally, Redondo Llenas asserted that in a period of approximately four months he was submitted to a series of traumatic experiences by the Palmas family that included witnessing drug deals by the Palmas, at least one other murder and had been the victim of a sexual attack which was videotaped by Luis Palmas de la Calzada. The Argentinian family vehemently denied all allegations but several factors cast doubt over their denial:
  - The site where the body was found was close to one of the Palmas’ properties, a dog breeding facility.
  - The Palmas’ attitude following the accusations was out of the ordinary for a diplomatic family – they resisted cooperating minimally with the authorities, utilized their diplomatic immunity protection to oppose any interrogation and investigation of their home or any of their properties and immediately exited the country.
  - They jeopardized their reputation, future career opportunities and left behind many of their assets, solely due to the accusations of Redondo Llenas, an 18-year-old murder suspect.
- The vehicle allegedly used for the crime was seized by police officers but was never examined forensically. It was repaired and was assigned to active police service only three days after the crime had taken place, in obvious violation of the law and due process.
- While the case was in "instrucción", a phase in the Dominican criminal process where an appointed magistrate conducts a separate investigation while appraising the merits of the case proposed by the police, a set of bizarre events took place:
  - The magistrate, Alexis Henriquez, requested supplementary security and the local police assigned him a bodyguard that had been working for Palmas Meccia. According to Redondo Llenas this man was present on the day that Palmas Meccia, acting on behalf of his father, Palmas de la Calzada, gave the instructions to deliver the boy.
  - Key evidence allegedly disappeared from the office of the magistrate including video footage obtained by the investigative magistrate that was supposed to have proved the linkage of the Palmas’ to this case and other criminal activities.
  - There were continuous leakages to the press regarding the direction of the investigation that jeopardized the authorities’ ability to have the upper hand and allowed potential suspects to cover their tracks.
- The police investigations concluded the crime was as a kidnapping with the intention of asking for a ransom of approximately US$700,000, but there was no evidence found or presented to prove the accused ever asked for money.
- There was speculation about possible sexual motives but there was no evidence found or presented to prove abuse.

=== Perpetrators ===
According to the interrogation and trial transcripts, Redondo Llenas (18 years old at the time), under duress by Palmas de la Calzada, and Moliné Rodriguez (also 18 years old at the time) invited José Rafael Llenas Aybar out. It is unknown what exactly happened between the time the boy left his home and the time he was found dead.

The fact that the boy and the mother felt safe with Redondo Llenas suggest that up to that point in their lives Redondo Llenas was a trusted member of the family. What happened to Redondo Llenas that transformed him from trusted cousin to accomplice in murder is possibly the greatest mystery of this tragic crime. He has argued exceptional duress from the Palmas’ while psychiatric tests on both Redondo Llenas and Moliné Rodriguez suggest personality disorders. The scientific value of these tests has been questioned by experts because of the manner in which the tests were performed, conclusions drawn and presented.

== Trial and sentencing ==
The trial concluded in January 1997 with guilty verdicts for Redondo Llenas and Moliné Rodríguez; both were sentenced to the maximum penalty of 30 years' imprisonment and charged US$300,000 each in damages to the victim’s family. An appeal in 1999 slightly reduced Moliné Rodríguez’s term to 20 years, on account that he was an accomplice.

Luis Palmas de la Calzada and his family were never prosecuted, first due to their diplomatic status which was the result of a direct designation by former Argentine president Carlos Menem, and second, because they quickly left the country, even before the Argentine government terminated their tenure. Although repeatedly summoned by the Dominican authorities they never returned.

The possibility of a satanic implication to the case was discussed and caused a lot of concern among the religious; Dominican Republic at the time was 90% Roman Catholic. A member of the Llenas family appeared in a widely seen TV show in the Dominican Republic, Revista 110 produced by Julio Hazim, to discuss potential evidence of a satanic cult and the Palmas’ relationship to Macumba and black magic practitioners such as José López Rega, who is known as “El Brujo”. The trial of Redondo Llenas and Moliné Rodriguez was one of the first broadly televised in Dominican history. The broadcast highly out-rated all other programming during its course.

== Aftermath ==
Further investigation by Dominican journalist and filmmaker Erwin Cott uncovered that Luis Palmas de la Calzada was a member of ultra-rightist Argentine Anticommunist Alliance during the Dirty War, an organization said to be responsible for countless deaths and disappearances during the 1970s in Argentina.

In 2007, Juan Moliné Rodríguez asked to be released on parole, which was widely criticized and ultimately rejected. He tried again in 2009 but was rejected again.

On November 5, 2013, Mario Redondo Llenas asked to be released on parole due to his "good behavior", he apologized to his aunt and uncle for killing his 12-year-old cousin in 1996. Redondo Llenas listed his involvement in prison literacy programs and his college degree as examples of his rehabilitation.
