= Christ Church (Rochester, New York) =

Historic church in New York, United States

- U.S. National Register of Historic Places
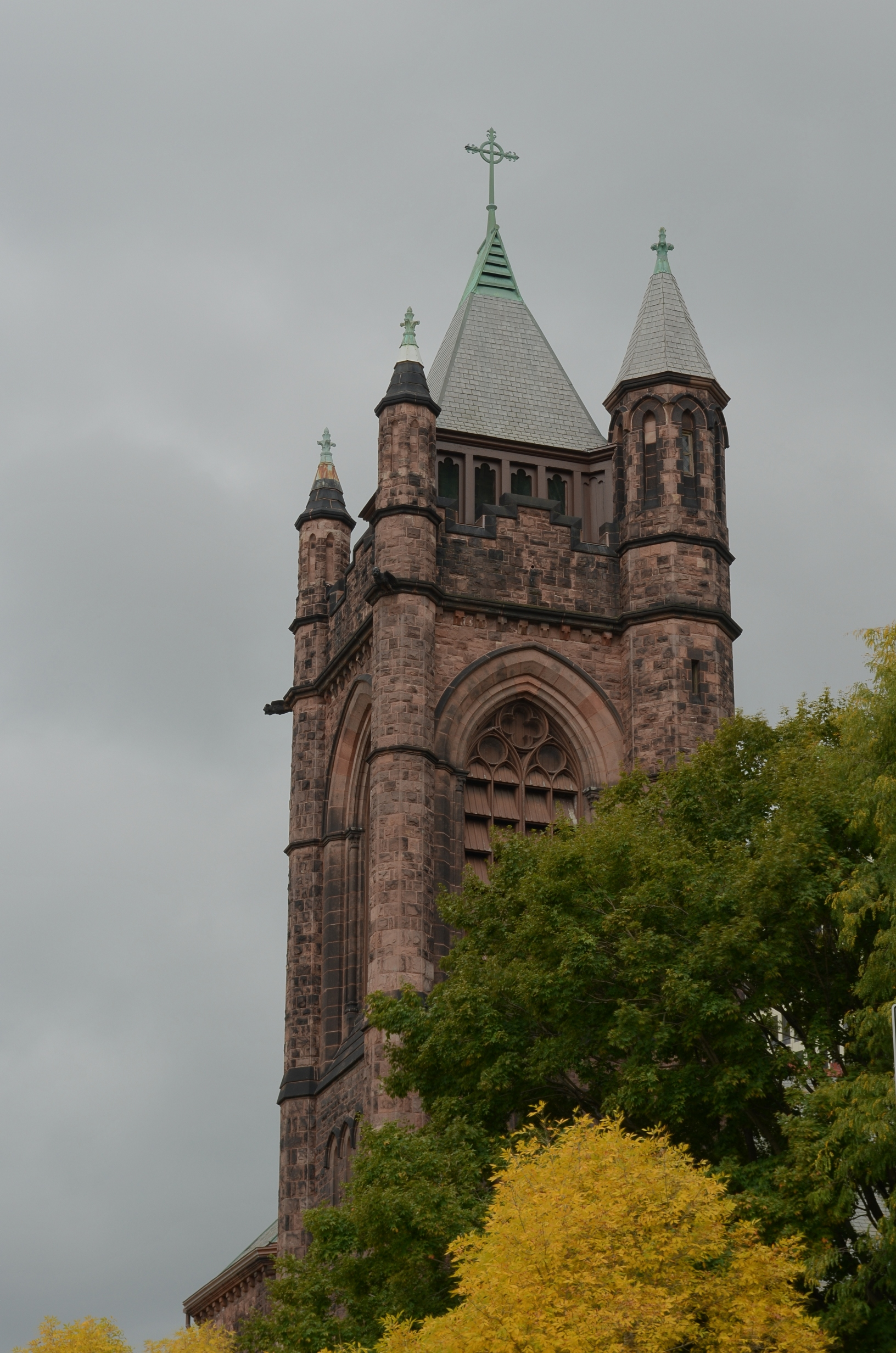
- The tower of Christ Church

- Location within New York Location within the United States
- Location: 141 East Ave., Rochester, New York
- Coordinates: 43°9′21.77″N 77°36′2.24″W
- Area: less than one acre
- Built: 1894
- Architectural style: Greek Revival
- NRHP reference No.: 08000024
- Added to NRHP: February 12, 2008

Christ Church, in Rochester, New York, is a parish in the Episcopal Diocese of Rochester. It is located at 141 East Avenue.

The church was listed on the National Register of Historic Places in 2008.

The church is a large Gothic Revival style building made of "rock-faced red Albion sandstone". It sports buttresses and flying buttresses.
