= Justice Lamar =

Justice Lamar may refer to:

- Lucius Quintus Cincinnatus Lamar (1825–1893), associate justice of the United States Supreme Court
- Joseph Rucker Lamar (1857–1916), associate justice of the United States Supreme Court
- Henry G. Lamar (1798–1861), associate justice of the Supreme Court of Georgia
- Ann Hannaford Lamar (born 1952), associate justice of the Supreme Court of Mississippi
