= Eastman Rochester Organ Initiative =

Project of the Eastman School of Music

The Casparini organ in Christ Church, Rochester NY

The Eastman Rochester Organ Initiative (EROI) is a project run by the Eastman School of Music with the goal of creating a unique collection of organ instruments in Rochester, New York.

== The Italian Baroque organ ==
The first milestone of the project was the acquisition of an original Italian baroque organ. The instrument was restored by German organbuilder Gerhard Woehl and installed in the Fountain Court of the Memorial Art Gallery, a museum of University of Rochester.

The instrument has one manual, pull down pedals and is tuned in meantone.

Manual (compass: CDEFGA – c3)	Pedal (pull-down, compass: CEFGA – g#)
Principale bassi/soprani (8')	Contrabassi (16')
Ottava (4')
Decimaquinta (2')
Decimanona (1 1/3')
Vigesima Seconda (1')
Vigesima Sesta e Nona (1/2' and 1/3')
Flauto in ottava (4')
Flauto in duodecima (2 2/3')
Flauto in XVII (1 3/5', from f1)
Voce Umana (8', from d1)
Tromboncini bassi/soprani (8')

== The Casparini Organ ==
The second instrument is a replica of the 1776 organ built by German organ builder Adam Gottlob Casparini for the Dominican Church of the Holy Spirit in Vilnius, Lithuania. The replica was built by the GOArt research center and is installed in Christ Church, Rochester, New York. The dedication took place in October 2008 during the yearly EROI festival. Munetaka Yokota was responsible for the voicing of the pipes and Monika May oversaw the painting and gilding of the case.

Claviatura Prima	Claviatura Secunda	Pedall
Principal 8'	Principal 4'	Principal Bass 16'
Borduna 16'	Iula 8'	Violon Bass 16'
Hohlflaut 8'	Principal Amalel 8'	Octava Bass 8'
Quintathon 8'	Unda Maris 8'	Flaut & Quint Bass 8'
Flaut Travers 4'	Flaut Major 8'	Full Bass 12'
Octava Principal 4'	Spiel Flöt 4'	Super Octava Bass 4'
Qvinta 3'	Flaut Minor 4'	Posaun Bass 16'
Super Octava 2'	Octava 2'	Trompet Bass 8'
Flasch Flöt 2'	Wald Flöt 2'
Tertia 1 3/5'	Mixtura III-IV
Mixtura IV-V	Dulcian 16' (added)
Trompet 8'	Vox Humana 8'

- Two tremulants
- II/I shove coupler
- 1/Pedall coupler (added)
- Gwiazdy (Cymbelstern)
- Vox Campanorum (Glockenspiel g^{0}-d^{3})
- Bebny (drum stop)
- Calcant
- Pitch: A4=465 Hz
- Temperament: Modified Neidhart 1732, Dorf

== Hook and Hastings opus 1573 ==
In the fall of 2012 an 1893 organ by Hook and Hastings was installed in Christ Church and inaugurated on November 30 with a recital of music by Johann Sebastian Bach, Camille Saint-Saëns and David Conte among others.

== The Ernest Skinner organ ==
The restoration of the 1921 Ernest Skinner organ in Kilbourn Hall, Eastman School of Music is also part of the project.
