= Örgryte Old Church =

Coordinates: 57.6986°N 11.9969°E

- Örgryte gamla kyrka
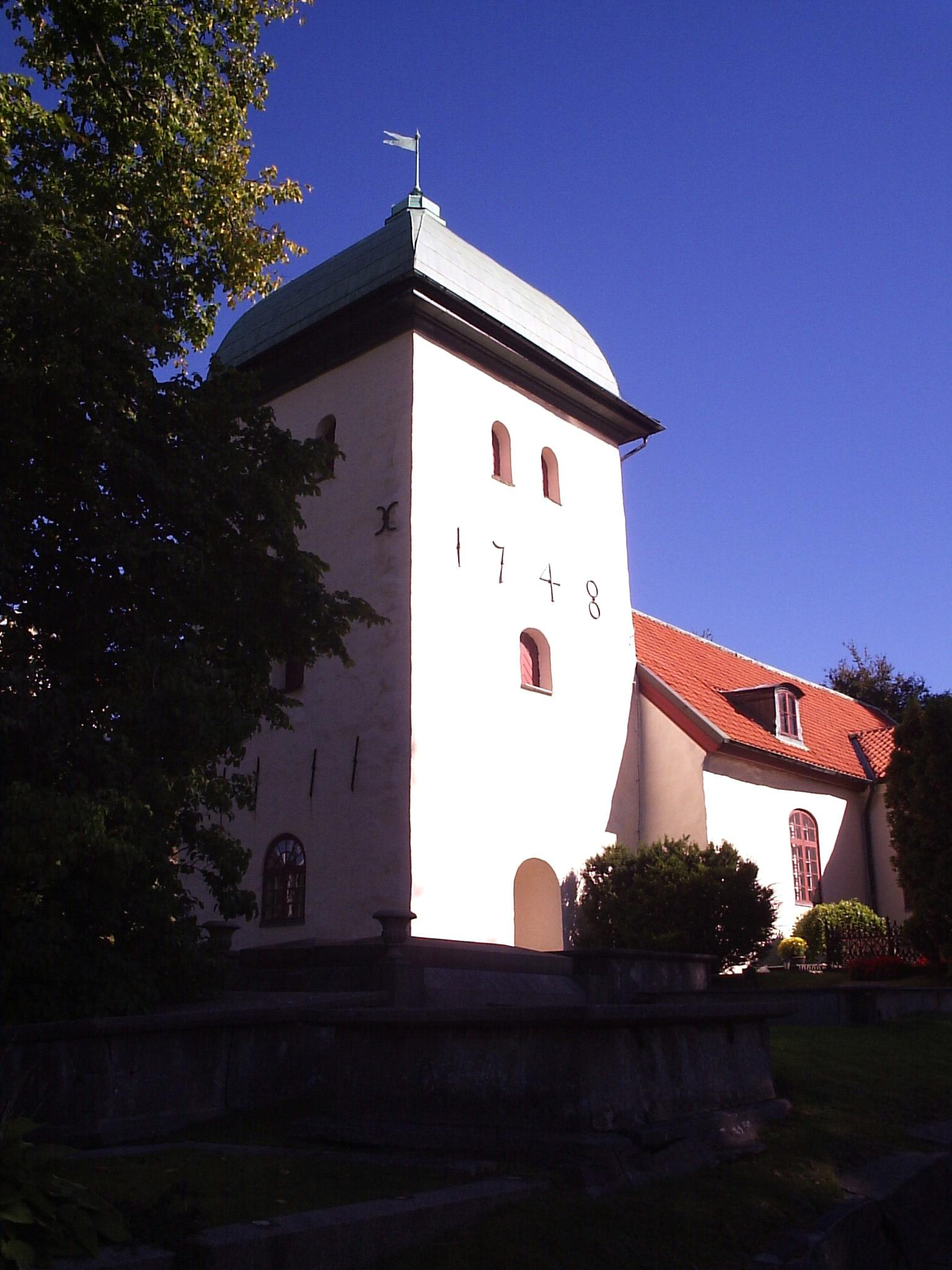
- Örgryte Old Church in September 2005
- Örgryte Old Church
- Location: Örgryte
- Country: Sweden
- Denomination: Church of Sweden
- Previous denomination: Roman Catholic Church

Administration
- Diocese: Gothenburg
- Parish: Örgryte

The Örgryte Old Church (Swedish: Örgryte gamla kyrka) is a church building in Örgryte in Gothenburg, Sweden. Belonging to the Örgryte Parish of the Church of Sweden, a church at the present site where the Örgryte Old Church is today has been around since the 13th century.

== See also ==
- Örgryte New Church
