= Lemar (surname) =

Lemar, LeMar, or Le Mar is a surname. Notable people with the surname include:

- Brynton Lemar (born 1995), American-born Jamaican basketball player for Hapoel Jerusalem of the Israeli Basketball Premier League
- Florence LeMar (1890–1951), stage name of Florence Gardiner, an athlete and entertainer
- Joseph LeMar, American paralympic athlete
- Roland Lemar (born 1976), American politician
- Thomas Lemar (born 1995), French footballer
- Angie Le Mar (born 1965), British comedian, actor, and writer

== See also ==
- Lemar (given name)
