= Lama (surname) =

Lama is a surname. Notable people with the surname include:

- Alfred A. Lama (1899-1984), Italian-born American architect and politician.
- Bernard Lama (born 1963), French football coach and former goalkeeper
- Kieran Lama, Australian drummer and manager of Spacey Jane
- Manolo Lama (born 1962), Spanish radio sportscaster
- Serge Lama (born 1943), French singer
- Sofía Lama (born 1987), Mexican actress
- Manuel Tarrazo Lama (born 1989), Dominican shoe designer, TV presenter and actor.
