= Shoney Lamar =

American singer-songwriter

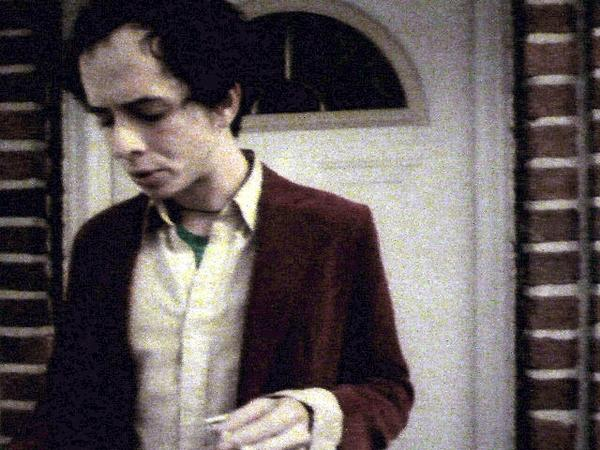
- Born: Justin Shirah; January 10, 1982 (age 43); Daytona Beach, Florida, United States
- Occupation: Singer songwriter, poet, artist

Shoney Lamar (birth name Justin Shirah) is a Boston–based singer songwriter, poet, and visual artist. Originally from Florida, he regularly appears in Boston and New York City, and elsewhere in the New England area. Shoney Lamar has released a number of albums and E.P.s, most recently 2009's "Revenge of the Narrator" and 2010's "Eat Fish and Die" and 2012's "Adult Entertainment" (all released with the recently disbanded backing group The Equal Rights). His songs have been described as "imbued with a glorious, snarling anger, holding hands with true affection."

Shoney Lamar was nominated for best male vocalist in Boston in the 2009 Boston Phoenix Readers Poll.

On June 21, 2013, Lamar released his first poetry book, "the cake no one wanted," which he considers not very different from his songwriting, quipping that the only difference is "poetry doesn’t have to rhyme, which is nice."

Lamar put out material with the group The Lady Comes First, a duo w/ the late Boston-based singer songwriter Adrian Emberley, in addition to various other projects, after moving to North Carolina where he lives now, working on solo albums.
