= Lamar, West Virginia =

Community in West Virginia, US

- Unincorporated community
- Location within the state of West Virginia Lamar, West Virginia (the United States)
- Coordinates: 37°27′14″N 81°18′17″W
- Country: United States
- State: West Virginia
- Counties: Mercer and Wyoming
- Elevation: 2,713 ft (827 m)
- Time zone: UTC-5 (Eastern (EST))
  - Summer (DST): UTC-4 (EDT)
- Area codes: 304 & 681
- GNIS feature ID: 1554904

Lamar is an unincorporated community in Mercer and Wyoming counties, West Virginia, United States. Lamar is 4 miles (6.4 km) northwest of Matoaka. Lamar was initially founded as Algonquin around 1915 by the Algonquin Coal Company, later renamed Lamar in 1930 after the Lamar Colliery Company took ownership of the town.

The community most likely was named after the Lamar family.
