= Pinkchyu =

American Internet personality and OnlyFans model (born 2002)

- Born: September 17, 2002 (age 24)
- Other name: Lin Lamar
- Occupations: Internet celebrity, streamer
- Years active: 2020–present

Linette Lamar (born September 17, 2002) known professionally as Pinkchyu is an American influencer, streamer, and OnlyFans model.

In the 2020s, she gained widespread popularity on TikTok, Twitch, and Instagram from her “goth girl” videos, lip-syncs, modeling photo shoots, and content on OnlyFans. In 2026, she made her singing debut, releasing her first two singles — "Electric Invasion" and "Back To Life".

== Life and career ==
Lin Lamar was born on September 17, 2002. in Austin, Texas She lives in Texas. She built her audience through visually striking content, often blending anime-inspired looks with bold fashion, gothic aesthetics, and cosplay. She positions herself as a "goth girl," which has become a central element of her online persona. Her content ranges from cosplay to more explicit posts.

As of 2026, she has over 800,000 followers on X, where she mostly posts thirst trap content. On TikTok, she has 2.6 million followers.

=== Content ===
She is known for her cosplay work, including portrayals of Sue Storm from The Fantastic Four and Makima from the Chainsaw Man manga series.

=== Personal life ===
In November 2024, Pinkchyu publicly accused her former partner Tectone of emotional and sexual abuse and harassment during their relationship. She filed a lawsuit seeking a civil protective order. On January 23, 2026, the judge ruled in her favor. On February 1, 2026, the streamer publicly acknowledged the outcome, emphasizing that the ruling was part of a civil proceeding and not a criminal conviction. The court imposed a no-contact order, requiring him to stay at least 200 yards away from her home and workplace, as well as to delete all photos and videos of Pinkchyu from his devices and pay her legal fees.

== Criticism ==
She received a major wave of backlash following a viral video posted in March 2026, in which she appears in gothic clothing and behaves seductively, joking about people who say she is "not goth." The video spread across X, drawing criticism from parts of the goth community. Some users argued that her content focuses more on appearance and engagement rather than the deeper roots of goth culture. Many users claimed that her goth persona only became prominent after her breakup, which made it feel calculated rather than authentic. As the criticism grew, the term "fake goth gooner bait" began to circulate.

In August 2026, she faced a wave of online harassment after participating in rapper Drake's "20-v-1" speed-dating event, which was streamed on Kick, where she was chosen as the winner. Drake selected Pinkchyu as his "wife" — a label used as part of the show's entertainment format. She went viral after asking Drake to "bark" for her, and the rapper played along. The moment became popular on social media and spawned internet memes. Some users paired the moment with Kendrick Lamar's track "Not Like Us," drawing on the public history of the feud between the rappers.

Soon, attention shifted to her appearance and gothic style. Users began sharing old photos of her and accusing her of being a "fake goth" and "catfishing" viewers. Other users also brought up her past legal dispute with her former partner Tectone, adding another layer to the backlash.

== Discography ==
=== Singles ===
- "Electric Invasion" (2026)
- "Back to Life" (2026)
