= Gothenburg Organ Art Center =

Swedish research center for pipe organs (1995–2016)

The Gothenburg Organ Art Center (GOArt), 1995–2016, was a research center based in Gothenburg, Sweden. The institute conducted research in organ building and organ performance from a wide variety of angles.

GOArt was founded by among others Hans Davidsson in 1995. In 2000 it became a department of the University of Gothenburg's Faculty of Fine and Applied Arts. Although it was part of the university it was externally funded through various research grants (over fifteen years ca. 160 million Swedish crowns external funding).

Several organs have been built at GOArt's organ building workshop, including the well known North German baroque organ in Örgryte Nya Kyrka. Organs have also been delivered to Cornell University, Korea National University of Arts and the Eastman School of Music. The workshop also produces clavichords.

== Research projects ==
=== COLLAPSE ===
GOArt has acted as the coordinator of COLLAPSE, a research project working to find ways to protect historical organ pipes from corrosion. The title of the project is an acronym for Corrosion of Lead and Lead-Tin Alloys of Organ Pipes in Europe.
