= Leona LaMar =

American stage mentalist (1883–1941)

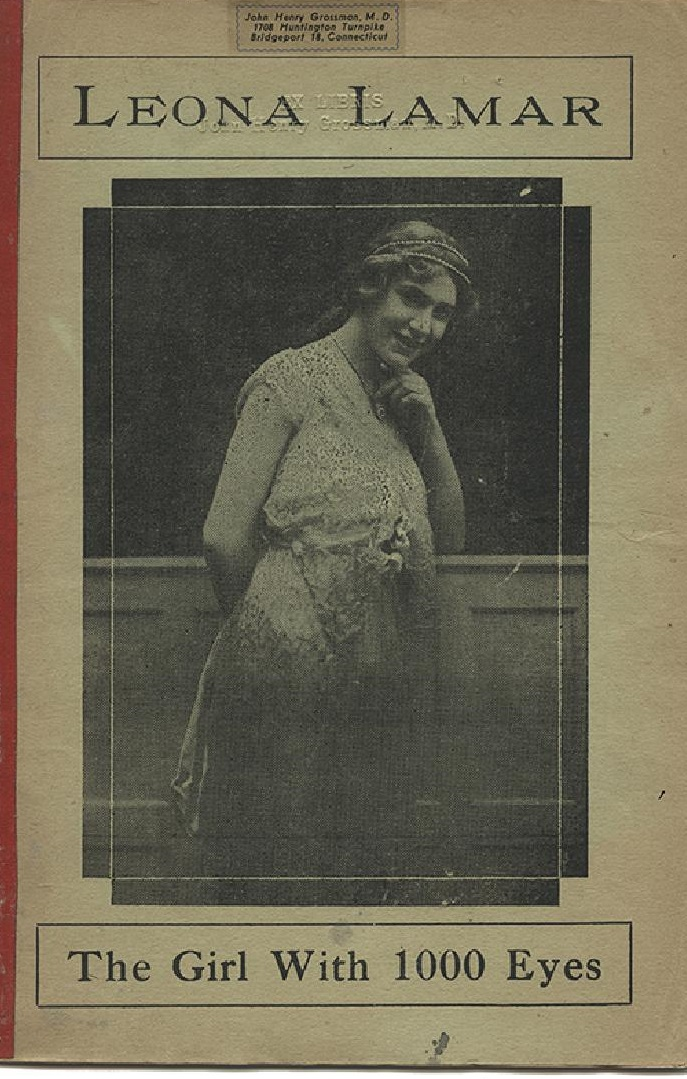
- LaMar circa 1921
- Born: Leontine DuMar; October 26, 1883; Rochester, New York
- Died: April 22, 1941; Englewood, New Jersey
- Occupation(s): Mentalist, Vaudeville act
- Spouse: Walter Shannon (-1930; his death)

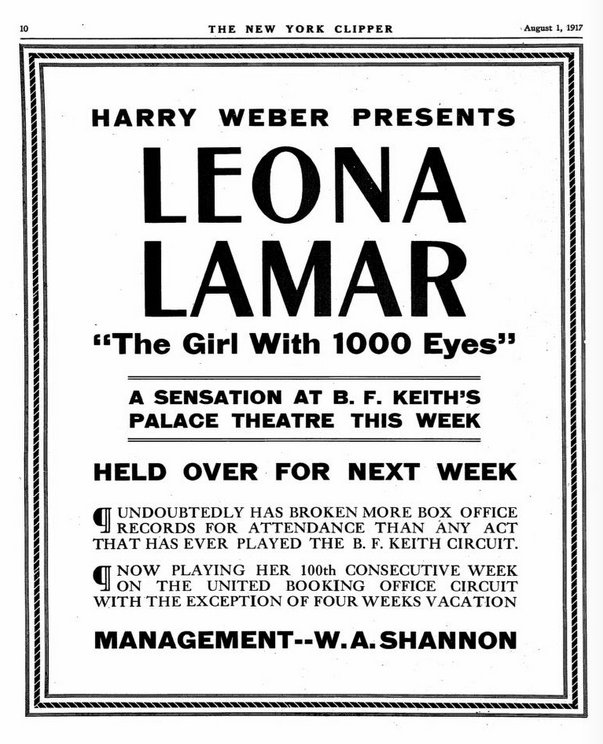
Advertisement for LaMar's act in the August 1, 1917 issue of the New York Clipper

Leona LaMar (October 26, 1883 – April 22, 1941), billed as "The Girl with 1,000 Eyes", was an American stage mentalist and vaudeville headliner in the 1910s and 1920s.

LaMar worked with Walter (Hugh) Shannon, who was also her husband, and was billed as having a "far superior" act than mentalist Eva Fay. Terry Turner signed the duo, who then earned $2,500 a week. The Shannons began their act in 1910, which featured mind-reading using astrology, and continued until Walter Shannon died in 1930.

LaMar was born in Rochester, New York as Leontine DuMar. She died at her home in Englewood, New Jersey on April 22, 1941, survived by her son Walter and daughter Leona.
