= Lamar Moore =

Celebrity chef

Lamar Jerome Moore
- Born: September 7, 1981 (age 45); United States of America
- Website: https://lamarmoore.com

Lamar Moore (born September 7, 1981, in Chicago, Illinois) is a celebrity chef and serves as an advocate and mentor, supporting youth transitioning into the culinary field.

== Early life and education ==
Lamar Moore was born in Chicago, Illinois, Lamar attending Le Cordon Bleu Culinary School in early 2000s. Lamar has served as a mentor at ProStart, a "two-year educational program for teens through the National Restaurant Association, where he shares his culinary experience with local Chicago Public School students by conducting demonstrations and workshops". Also, he is an advocate for youth within the culinary industry.

== Career ==
Moore has worked for McCormick and Schmicks Seafood Restaurants and the Chicago Bears, among others. He used his culinary skills for a social experiment on the show Welcome to Waverly. He competed on Chopped, showcasing his soon-to-be award-winning burgers, and Beat Bobby Flay, where he was eliminated in the first round. He won Food Network's Vegas Chef Prizefight competition to become the Executive Chef of Bugsy and Meyers Steakhouse at Caesars Entertainment at Flamingo Hotel in July 2020. He left that position four months later. As of December 2024, Moore is chef and owner of ETC. Restaurant in downtown Chicago.

Moore partnered with World Kitchen to feed many during COVID-19. He used his celebrity status to raise funds for Door Dash and RED's COVID-19 Relief fund.
