= North German baroque organ in Örgryte Nya Kyrka =

Pipe organ in Gothenburg, Sweden

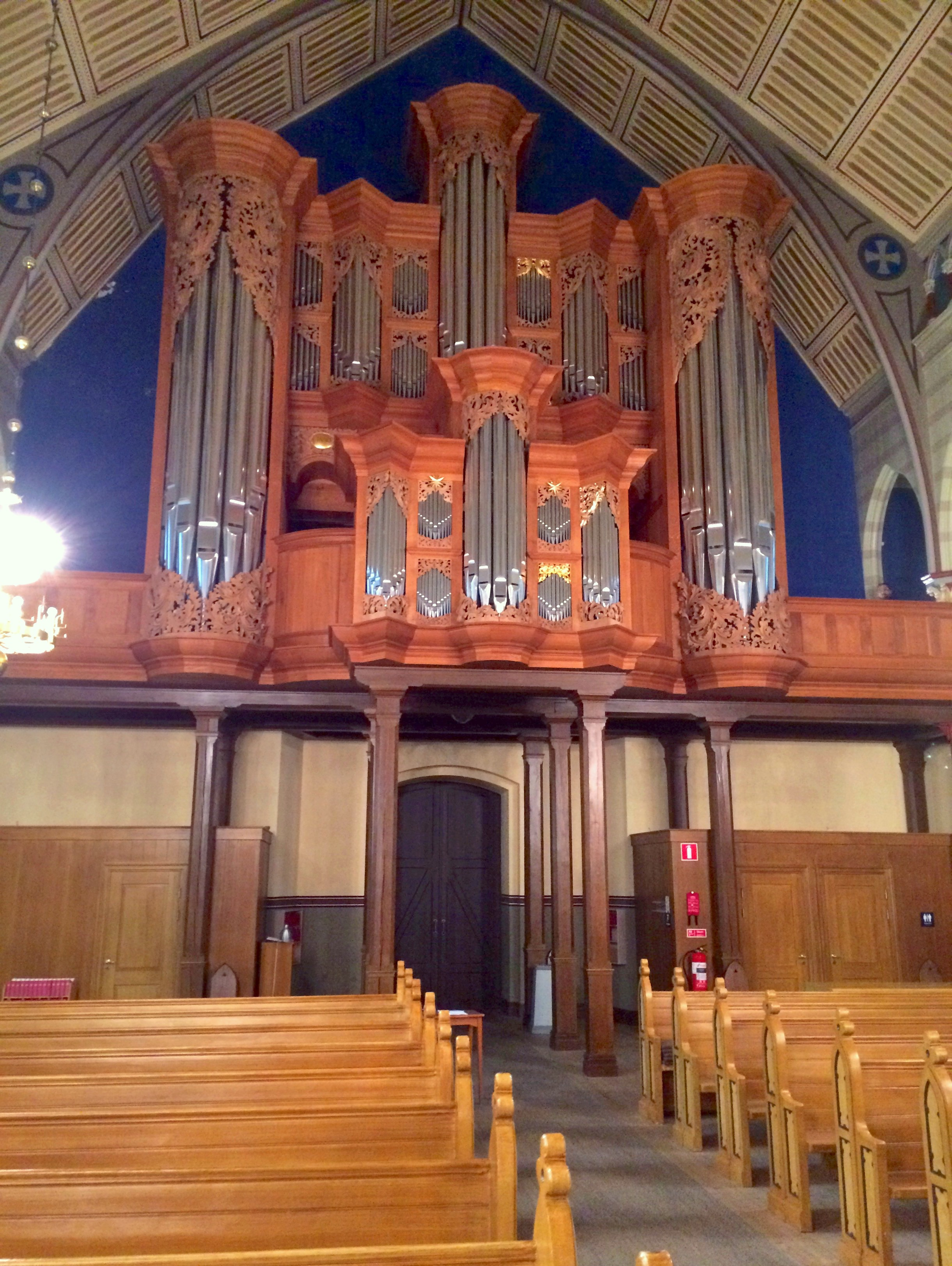
Façade of the organ

The North German baroque organ in Örgryte nya kyrka (Örgryte New Church) is a pipe organ in Gothenburg. It was built within a research project at GOArt, University of Gothenburg and dedicated on August 12, 2000. The goal of the project was to recreate the construction techniques and design philosophies of 17th-century German organbuilder Arp Schnitger. Even though the instrument was built in the style of this single builder it was not modeled after a single instrument. No single model could be used since no large Schnitger organ has been preserved in original condition. The construction of the organ was carried out by an international team of organ builders. Henk van Eeken was responsible for the design and the technical drawings, Munetaka Yokota for the pipe work and Mats Arvidsson oversaw the building process. The instrument contains almost 4000 pipes and is the largest existing organ tuned in quarter-comma meantone.

== Design ==
The design of the instrument was the result of the study of several historic organs. The pipework and disposition was largely based on the Schnitger organ in St. Jacobi (St James's), Hamburg while the façade and the console were based on the organ in Lübeck Cathedral. The bellows were designed after the organ in the Grote Kerk (Great Church), Zwolle while the key action was modeled after the organ in St. Laurent's church in Alkmaar.

=== Console and action ===
The console in Örgryte is based on the console from Lübeck Cathedral, the only preserved console from a large Schnitger organ. Since the Lübeck instrument only had three manuals and the Örgryte has four, the concept had to be expanded.

=== Pipe work ===
The pipework was built with the St. Jakobi organ as the model (with very few exceptions). However, that instrument has been revoiced a number of times, so complementary studies had to be made of well-preserved pipes of other organs.

=== Case ===
The west wall of Örgryte Nya Kyrka was too small to fit a copy of the 32' façade in St. Jacobi, Hamburg so a different model had to be found. The solution chosen was to use the design of the Schnitger organ in Lübeck Cathedral. Since that organ was destroyed in firebombing of Lübeck on Palm Sunday 1942, it had to be reconstructed from photographs using photogrammetrical methods. The case was placed as close as possible to the wall to shorten the distance the air must travel from the bellows room and to increase acoustical reflection.

A new balcony had to be constructed to support the organ case. It was designed by architect Ulf Oldaeus, based on a number of historical models, mainly the balconies of St. Nicolai und Martini in Steinkirchen, Lower Saxony.

=== Wind system ===
The organs built by Arp Schnitger had a higher number of bellows per instrument than many other builders of his time. In his larger instruments it was not uncommon to have 12 or even 16 bellows. Since the Schnitger organ in Zwolle is the only one with a well-preserved original bellows system it was used as the model for the Örgryte organ. For practical reasons it was decided to include an electrical blower as an option to pumping the bellows manually.

The windchests were based on those of Hamburg St. Jacobi, but were slightly modified to fit into the Örgryte case. Some modification also had to be made to accommodate the extra pipes for the sub-semitones.

=== Disposition ===
The organ has 54 stops divided between 4 manuals and pedals. It is tuned in quarter-comma meantone and the pitch is a’ = 465 Hz.

Werck CDEFGA-c^{3}	Oberpositiv CDEFGA-c^{3}	Rückpositiv CDE-c^{3}	Brustpositiv CDEFGA-c^{3}	Pedal C-d^{1}
Principal 16' (AS)	Principal 8' (AS)	Principal 8' (AS)	Principal 8' (Fri)	Principal 16' (AS)
Quintaden 16' (Fri/AS)	Hollfloit 8' (AS)	Quintadena 8' (Sch?/Fri/AS)	Octav 4' (Sch?/Fri?)	SubBass 16' (AS)
Octav 8' (Sch/AS)	Rohrfloit 8' (AS)	Gedact 8' (Sch)	Hollfloit 4' (AS)	Octav 8' (AS)
Spitzfloit 8' (AS)	Spitzfloit 4' (AS)	Octava 4' (Fri/AS)	Waldtfloit 2' (AS)	Octav 4'(AS)
Octav 4' (Sch/AS)	Octav 4' (Sch/Fri?)	Blockfloit 4' (Sch)	Sesquialter 2f. (Fri)	Rauschpfeiffe 3f. (AS)
Super Octav 2' (AS)	Nassat 3' (AS)	Octav 2' (Fri)	Scharff 4–6f. (AS)	Mixtur 6–8f. (Fri)
Rauschpfeiff 2f. (Sch/AS)	Gemshorn 2' (Sch)	Quer Floit 2' (Fri)	Dulcian 8' (AS)	Posaunen 32’ (from F) (AS)
Mixtur 6–8f. (Fr)	Octav 2' (Fri)	Sieffloit 1½ (Fri)	Trechter Regal 8' (AS)	Posaunen 16’ (AS)
Trommet 16' (AS)	Scharff 6f. (Fri)	Sexquialt 2f. (Fr)		Dulcian 16' (AS)
	Cimbel 3f. (Fr)	Scharff 4–6f. (Fri)		Trommet 8' (AS)
	Trommet 8' (AS)	Dulcian 16' (Fri)		Trommet 4' (AS)
	Vox Humana 8' (AS)	Bahrpfeiff 8' (AS/FCS)		Cornet 2’ (AS)
	Zincke 8' (from f^{0}) (based on Appingedam)
In the style of: AS = Arp Schnitger; FCS = Franz Caspar Schnitger; Fri = Gottfried Fritzsche; Sch = Scherer family ^{(de)}.

== Bibliography ==
- Snyder, Kerala, ed. (2002). The Organ as a Mirror of its Time. Oxford: Oxford University Press. ISBN 0-19-514414-7.
- Speerstra, Joel, ed. (2003). The North German Research Project at Göteborg University. Gothenburg: Göteborg Organ Art Center. ISBN 91-972612-1-1.
