= Edward Leigh Chase =

American painter (1884–1965)

- Born: 1884; Elkhart Lake, Wisconsin
- Died: 1965 (aged 80/81); Woodstock, New York
- Education: Art Students League
- Known for: Drawing, illustration, painting
- Relatives: Frank Swift Chase (brother), Chevy Chase (grandson)

Edward Leigh Chase (1884–1965) was an American painter and illustrator, and an early member of the Byrdcliffe experiment which gave rise to the artists' colony at Woodstock, New York. A gifted sketch artist and watercolorist, he was one of the group of young Art Students League humorists who called themselves the Fakirs.

== Life and work ==
Edward Leigh Chase was born in Elkhart Lake, Sheboygan County, Wisconsin, the third child of Grace (née Metcalfe) and chemist Charles Denison Chase. His family moved to St Louis, Missouri, in 1885, when he was an infant, and he grew up attending public schools there. Shunning regular college, he traveled to New York City to study art at the Art Students League. Among his professors there was the painter William Merritt Chase.

Edward Leigh Chase – "Ned" to those who knew him – showed particular promise in his use of pen and ink, and he soon turned his talent and wit to humor. For fun and valuable practice, a group of irreverent pupils at the league in Manhattan created parody illustrations mocking serious works of leading artists, among them their own professors, William Merritt Chase included. The students who participated in such lampooning called themselves the Society of American Fakirs, word play on the fact that the faux masterpieces they produced were fakes. The name implied as well that they fancied themselves magicians of a sort. With a wave of a pen or paintbrush, they could transform "legitimate" art into laughing stock. Among the Fakirs were Georgia O'Keeffe, James Montgomery Flagg, Man Ray, Yasuo Kuniyoshi, and Ned Chase's younger brother, Frank Swift Chase.

Graduating from the Art Students League, the Chase brothers headed upstate to the Catskill Mountains to join in an experimental bohemian commune of a style, organized by Ralph Whitehead in Woodstock, New York. Building their own clapboard studios in the woods outside the village proper, they studied and worked together in what they saw as an artists' utopia, named Byrdcliffe. Ned Chase honed his skills in sketching and watercolor, and emerged a successful illustrator, albeit not of the caliber of his brother, Frank, who became a landscape painter of national renown. Later in life, Ned Chase painted fine equestrian portraiture of a classical style which he might have roundly excoriated as a "Fakir" in his youth.

Edward Leigh Chase died in Woodstock in 1965, and is buried with other family members in the Artists' Cemetery there. He was married to Mabel Penrose (née Tinsley), the daughter of Edward Tinsley and Laura Penrose Thornton. His grandson is the actor, writer, and comedian Chevy Chase.

== Sources ==
- Catalog of the Society of American Fakirs. Tenth Exhibition (New York: The Society of American Fakirs, 1901).
- "Art: Fakirs Resurrected". Time, May 9, 1932.
- Parodies of the American Masters: Rediscovering the Society of American Fakirs, 1891-1914 (New York: Art Students League, 1993).
- Raymond J. Steiner. The Art Students League of New York: A History (Saugerties, New York: CSS Publications, Inc., 1999).
- Smithsonian American Art Museum, Peter A. Juley and Son Collection.
