= Frank Chase =

Frank Chase may refer to:

- Frank Chase, musician and brother of Nash Chase
- Frank Chase (screenwriter) (1924–2004), character actor and screenwriter
- Frank William Chase (known as Will Chase; born 1970), American actor
- Frank Swift Chase (1886–1958), American Post-Impressionist landscape painter
