= Frank Swift Chase =

American painter (1886–1958)

- Born: March 12, 1886; St Louis, Missouri
- Died: July 3, 1958 (aged 72); Benedictine Hospital; Kingston, New York
- Education: Art Students League
- Known for: Painting, drawing
- Movement: Post-Impressionism
- Relatives: Edward Leigh Chase (brother), Chevy Chase (grandnephew)

Frank Swift Chase (12 March 1886 – 3 July 1958) was an American Post-Impressionist landscape painter and a founder of the Woodstock Artists Association in Woodstock, New York, the art colony at Nantucket, Massachusetts, and the Sarasota School of Art in Florida.

== Education and training ==
Chase was born in St Louis, Missouri, on 12 March 1886. The fourth child of Grace (née Metcalfe) and Charles Denison Chase, he attended public elementary school and high school in St Louis. Despite a mathematical mind, he did not progress to college, instead working as an assistant in his father's laboratory at the Aluminum Company of America in Bauxite, Arkansas. His father was an Alcoa chemist noted among the pioneers of experimentation with the use of nitroglycerin in mining.

In his early twenties he traveled to New York City to join his elder brother, Edward Leigh Chase, at the Art Students League, and later followed him again to ASL's Art League School of Landscape Painting at Woodstock, where he studied under L. Birge Harrison and John F. Carlson in 1909. The Chase brothers, both gifted artists, were early members of the Woodstock artist's colony, whose participants worked and lived in hand-made Catskill Mountain cabins as part of Ralph Whitehead's experiment with utopian living at Byrdcliffe, the Bohemian settlement nestled in the slopes above the town.

== Teacher and founder ==
A decade later, in 1919, Chase was one of the founders of the Woodstock Artists' Association, along with Andrew Dasburg, Carl Eric Lindin, Henry Lee McFee, and his former teacher John Carlson. The following year he summered on Nantucket Island, where he established his first art school. From 1920 onward, Chase was the leading teacher of painting there for three decades. Dubbed "the dean of Nantucket artists" by the Artists Association of Nantucket, he was largely responsible for the development of that community as a true art colony. Among Chase's most important legacies were his students, including many who became renowned painters themselves: Elizabeth Saltonstall, Isabelle Hollister Tuttle, Ruth Haviland Sutton, Emily Hoffmeier and Anne Ramsdell Congdon. Chase encouraged open-air painting classes, weather permitting, otherwise utilizing wharf cottages along the waterfront, reminiscent of his own tutelage back in the mountain shanties of Woodstock. He helped to establish and nurture the Nantucket Artists Association, along with other influential local artists like Pat Gardner, Sybil Goldsmith, Philip Burnham Hicken, Edgar Jenney, C. Robert Perrin and Tony Sarg.

Although based in Manhattan, Woodstock and Nantucket, Chase traveled around the United States. He spent a two-year stint in southern California during 1935 and 1936, painting the desert outside Palm Springs. In 1940, he founded the Sarasota School of Art at Longboat Key, Florida, where he taught periodically through 1952. Back in Woodstock, he taught and helped to promote such future notables as Harvey Fite, Anton Refregier and Marko Vukovic.

== Death ==
Chase died at the Benedictine Hospital in Kingston, New York, on 3 July 1958. He is buried among other family members in the Artists Cemetery in Woodstock.

== Legacy ==
Chase's paintings are heirs of the Northern Romantic tradition. Clearly influenced in his youth by American Impressionism and Post-Impressionism, he became more faithful to nature as his style matured, many of his later landscapes evoking a spiritual kinship with earlier Hudson River School masters like Albert Bierstadt, Thomas Cole and Frederic Edwin Church.

His brother Edward Leigh Chase is the paternal grandfather of the actor Chevy Chase.

== Exhibitions ==
- Pennsylvania Academy of Fine Arts, 1918–1923
- Corcoran Gallery, 1919–1923; Newport Artists Association, 1920 and 1924 (first prize)
- Salmagundi Art Club, 1921; National Academy of Design, 1921
- Art Institute of Chicago, 1922 (prize)
- Eastman School of Music, 1922; Rochester Memorial Art Gallery (New York), 1922; Philadelphia Arts Council, 1922
- Minneapolis Institute of Arts, 1922; Herron Art Institute, 1922; Indiana Artists Association, 1923; Carnegie Institute, 1923; Peabody Art Gallery, Baltimore, 1923
- Art Directors Club, 1924 (medal); San Diego Fine Arts Gallery, 1928
- Woodstock Artists Association; Springfield Artists Association; Kenneth Taylor Galleries, Nantucket
- 1953; Artists Association of Nantucket, 1954.

== Associations ==
- Member: Allied Artists Association, 1913
- Springfield Artists Association (Illinois)
- Connecticut Academy of Fine Arts, 1922
- Woodstock Artists Association, 1919
- Artists Association of Nantucket, 1945-1954.

== Sources ==
- Woodstock Artists Association, permanent archives.
- Nantucket Historical Association, archives.
- A Genealogy of David Latham Stevens and Richard Chase Stevens, (Volume IV), by D.L. Stevens.
- The Nantucket Inquirer and Mirror
- "Grounded at Sea Level: Frank Swift Chase on Nantucket", by Robert Frazier
- Artists Association of Nantucket, permanent archives.
