= Woodstock, New York =

- Town
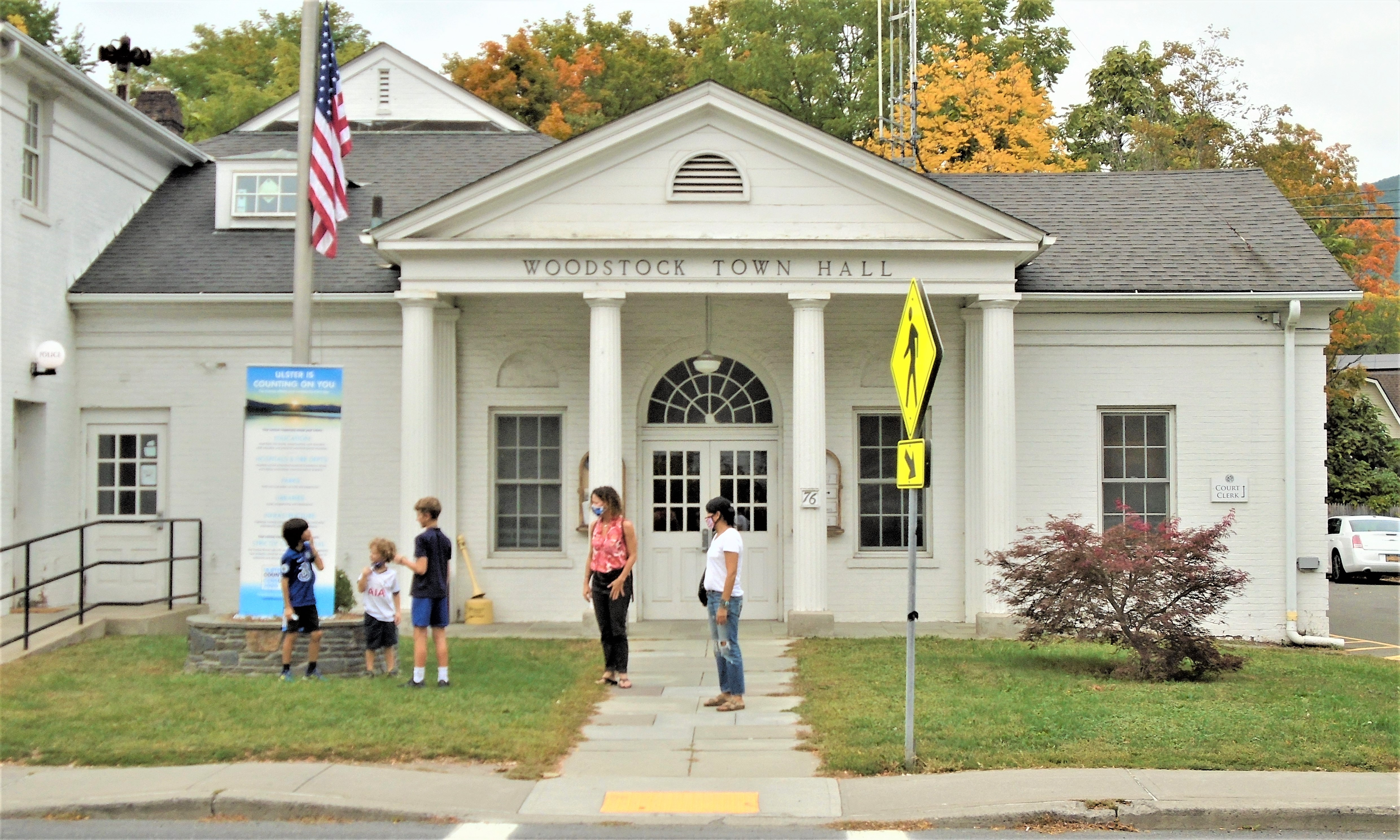
- Town hall on Tinker Street (NY 212)

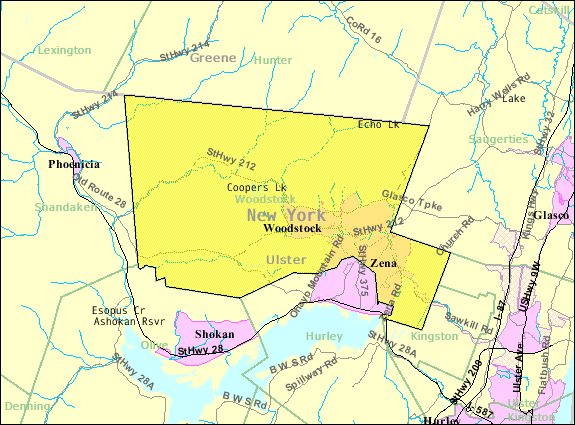
- U.S. Census map

- Location in Ulster County and the state of New York.

- Location within the state of New York
- Coordinates: 42°2′26″N 74°7′44″W
- Country: United States
- State: New York
- County: Ulster

Area
  - Total: 67.83 sq mi (175.69 km^{2})
  - Land: 67.29 sq mi (174.28 km^{2})
  - Water: 0.54 sq mi (1.41 km^{2})
- Elevation: 1,440 ft (440 m)

Population (2020)
  - Total: 6,287
  - Density: 93.4/sq mi (36.07/km^{2})
- Time zone: UTC-5 (Eastern (EST))
  - Summer (DST): UTC-4 (EDT)
- ZIP code: 12498
- Area code: 845
- FIPS code: 36-83052
- GNIS feature ID: 0979655
- Website: woodstockny.gov

Woodstock is a town in Ulster County, New York, United States, in the northern part of the county, northwest of Kingston. It lies within the borders of the Catskill Park. The population was 6,287 at the 2020 census, up from 5,884 in 2010.

Although local Woodstock Sound-Outs were staged in the local area, the actual "Woodstock" Festival was held almost 60 miles (97 km) away at Max Yasgur's farm in the town of Bethel.

== History ==
The first non-indigenous settler arrived around 1770, and the town of Woodstock was established in 1787. Later, territory from Woodstock was contributed to form the towns of Middletown (1789), Windham (1798), Shandaken (1804), and Olive (1853).

Woodstock played host to numerous Hudson River School painters during the late 1800s. The Arts and Crafts Movement came to Woodstock in 1902, with the arrival of Ralph Radcliffe Whitehead, Bolton Brown and Hervey White, who formed the Byrdcliffe Colony. In 1906, L. Birge Harrison and others founded the Summer School of the Art Students League of New York in the area, primarily for landscape painting. Ever since, Woodstock has been considered an active artists colony. From 1915 through 1931, Hervey White's Maverick Art Colony held the Maverick Festivals, "in which hundreds of free spirits gathered each summer for music, art, theater and drunken orgies in the woods."

A series of Woodstock Sound-Outs were staged at Pan Copeland's farm just over the town line in Saugerties from 1967 to 1970. These featured folk and rock acts such as Richie Havens, Paul Butterfield, Dave van Ronk and Van Morrison and were identified with Woodstock's reputation as a summer arts colony. The Sound-Outs inspired the original Woodstock Festival's organizers to plan their concert at the Winston Farm in Saugerties. "The Sound-Outs just had a great feel", said Woodstock Festival producer Michael Lang. "And it was in the country and it provided all the guidelines that I needed." However, the town turned down their permit, and the "Woodstock" Festival was actually held almost 60 miles (97 km) away at Max Yasgur's farm in the town of Bethel.

Woodstock is also home to the Karma Triyana Dharmachakra Buddhist monastery, situated at the top of Mead's Mountain Road.

== Geography ==
According to the United States Census Bureau, the town has a total area of 67.8 square miles (175.7 km^{2}), of which 67.3 square miles (174.3 km^{2}) is land and 0.54 square miles (1.4 km^{2}), or 0.80%, is water.

The northern town line is the border of Greene County.

== Demographics ==
Historical population
Census	Pop.	Note	%±
1820	1,317		—
1830	1,376		4.5%
1840	1,691		22.9%
1850	1,650		−2.4%
1860	1,858		12.6%
1870	2,022		8.8%
1880	1,968		−2.7%
1890	1,628		−17.3%
1900	1,675		2.9%
1910	1,647		−1.7%
1920	1,488		−9.7%
1930	1,652		11.0%
1940	1,983		20.0%
1950	2,271		14.5%
1960	3,836		68.9%
1970	5,714		49.0%
1980	6,823		19.4%
1990	6,290		−7.8%
2000	6,241		−0.8%
2010	5,884		−5.7%
2020	6,287		6.8%
U.S. Decennial Census

As of the census of 2000, there were 6,241 people, 2,946 households, and 1,626 families residing in the town. The population density was 92.5 people per square mile (35.7 people/km^{2}). There were 3,847 housing units at an average density of 57.0 per square mile (22.0/km^{2}). The racial makeup of the town was 94.25% white, 1.30% black or African American, 0.21% Native American, 1.57% Asian, 0.02% Pacific Islander, 0.79% from other races, and 1.87% from two or more races. Hispanic or Latino of any race were 2.56% of the population.

There were 2,946 households, out of which 21.7% had children under the age of 18 living with them, 44.2% were married couples living together, 7.9% had a female householder with no husband present, and 44.8% were non-families. 35.5% of all households were made up of individuals, and 10.6% had someone living alone who was 65 years of age or older. The average household size was 2.10 and the average family size was 2.71.

In the town, the population was spread out, with 18.0% under the age of 18, 3.7% from 18 to 24, 23.0% from 25 to 44, 38.0% from 45 to 64, and 17.3% who were 65 years of age or older. The median age was 48 years. For every 100 females, there were 94.7 males. For every 100 females age 18 and over, there were 93.1 males.

The median income for a household in the town was $49,217, and the median income for a family was $65,938. Males had a median income of $41,500 versus $33,672 for females. The per capita income for the town was $32,133. About 6.9% of families and 10.2% of the population were below the poverty line, including 12.8% of those under age 18 and 3.9% of those age 65 or over.

== Music and art ==
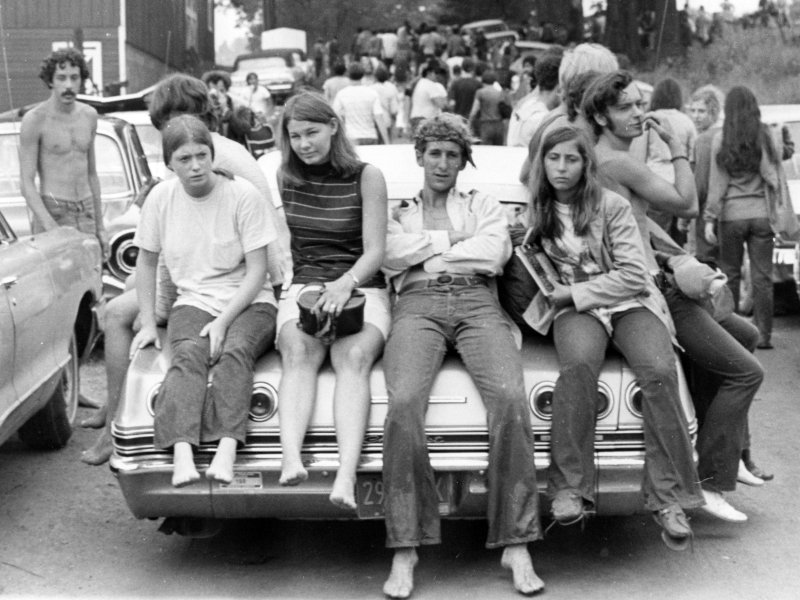
Woodstock festival attendees, 1969

The town is famous for lending its name to the Woodstock Festival, which was actually held at Max Yasgur's dairy farm almost 60 miles (97 km) away in Bethel in Sullivan County. The festival was never planned to be held in or near the town of Woodstock; instead, it was first planned for Wallkill, New York, but was relocated to Bethel after Wallkill withdrew.

The 1903 Byrdcliffe art colony is one of the nation's oldest Arts & Crafts colonies. It brought the first artists to Woodstock to teach and produce furniture, metal works, ceramics, and weaving and established Woodstock's first painting school. Byrdcliffe forever changed the cultural landscape of the Town of Woodstock.

In 1916, utopian philosopher and poet Hervey White built a "music chapel" in the woods. This became the home of the Maverick music festival, the longest-running summer chamber music festival in the country, still held annually as of 2025. Composers such as Henry Cowell, John Cage, Robert Starrer and Peter Schickele created works that were premiered there. Today, this hand-built concert hall with perfect acoustics is a multi-starred attraction on the National Register of Historic Places with world-class musicians playing there from June to September. Hervey White also hosted numerous young artists at the Maverick colony, including Lucile Blanch, Arnold Blanch, John Bernard Flannagan, Eugene Ludins, and Hannah Small.

The town is home to the Woodstock Artists Association and Museum (WAAM), founded in 1919 by John F. Carlson, Frank Swift Chase, Andrew Dasburg, Carl Eric Lindin, and Henry Lee McFee. The WAAM Permanent Collection features work by important American artists associated with the region, including Milton Avery, George Bellows, Edward Leigh Chase, Frank Swift Chase, Florence Ballin Cramer, Arnold Blanch, Doris Lee, Marion Greenwood, Philip Guston, Yasuo Kuniyoshi, Paul Meltsner, and many others. The Art Students League of New York's summer school was in Woodstock from 1906 until 1922, and again after World War II, from 1947 until 1979. The Woodstock School of Art has been operating since 1980.

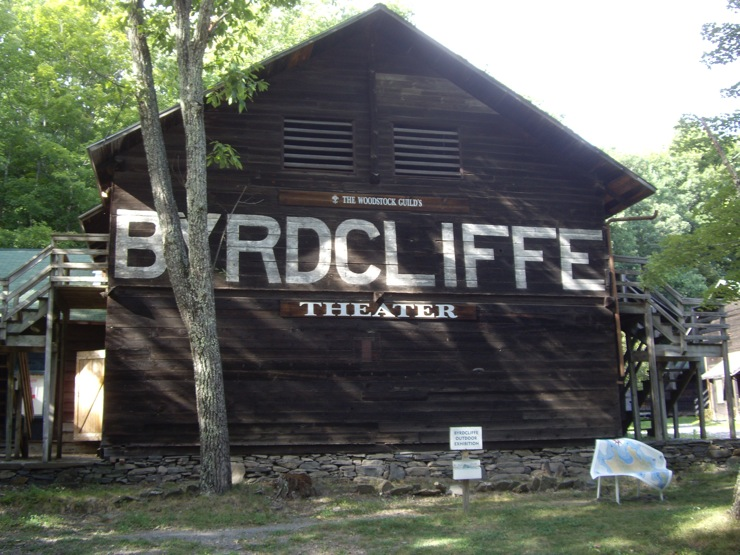
Byrdcliffe Theater, located on the grounds of the Byrdcliffe Arts Colony

The Woodstock Guild, founded by Byrdcliffe artists in 1939, is now the steward of the 350-acre (1.4 km^{2}) Byrdcliffe Colony. It is a multicultural organization which sponsors exhibitions, classes, concerts, dance and theatre events and runs the oldest craft shop in Woodstock, the Fleur de Lis Gallery, which features over 60 artists. Voice Theatre currently has permanent residency at the Byrdcliffe Theater, which they renovated in 2015. Byrdcliffe is on the National Register of Historic Places and is a haven for today's artists.

In 1981, the town hosted the Woodstock Jazz Festival, a celebration of the Creative Music Studio, an organization founded in 1971 by Karl Berger and Ornette Coleman. The show featured Jack Dejohnette, Chick Corea, Pat Metheny, Anthony Braxton, Lee Konitz, and Miroslav Vitouš, among others.

On April 19–22, 2012, Woodstock hosted the Woodstock Writers Festival. Ann Hood, Augusten Burroughs, Shalom Auslander, Kurt Andersen and Ned Leavitt spoke and offered workshops on a variety of topics related to literature.

Woodstock is the home of the Woodstock Film Festival, founded in 2000. The Woodstock Film Festival is an Oscar®-qualifying festival in the short film categories - Live Action Short Film, Animated Short Film, and Documentary Short Film.

== Education ==
The school district for most of the town is Onteora Central School District. A portion of the town is in Saugerties Central School District. Saugerties High School is the zoned comprehensive high school of the Saugerties district.

== Notable people ==
The town has long been a mecca for artists, musicians, actors, and writers, even before the music festival made the name "Woodstock" famous. The town has a separate "Artist's Cemetery". Film and art festivals attract big names, and hundreds of musicians have come to Woodstock to record. Among the major musicians were the pioneer, Bob Dylan, followed by, among others, Joe Cocker. All those musicians were performing in a bar which became world-famous, the Joyous Lake.

Another one-time Woodstock resident, Lee Marvin, was employed at the Woodstock Heckeroth Plumbing Company whose career was launched when the main actor of the defunct Woodstock Theater was sick, leading to Marvin being called in as a replacement.

== Local communities and landmarks ==
- Artists' Cemetery – A cemetery for Woodstock artists and luminaries on Rock City Road.
- Ashokan Reservoir – A New York City reservoir under which lies nine lost towns.
- Bearsville – A hamlet at the junction of State Route 212 and County Route 45, west of Woodstock village.
- Byrdcliffe – Site of the original art colony east of the junction of Routes 212 and Glasco Turnpike (County Route 33), northwest of Woodstock village on the lower slopes of Mount Guardian above Glasco Turnpike. At one time it was home for the Turnau Opera and now the Byrdcliffe Theater.
- Church of the Holy Transfiguration of Christ-on-the-Mount.
- Cooper Lake – Kingston reservoir located south of Lake Hill, northwest of Bearsville and west by northwest of Shady.
- Daisy – A hamlet east of Woodstock in Saugerties associated with Woodstock through the Woodstock Jewish Congregation, sometimes called East Woodstock; here it is said are the most "documented" stone cairns, mounds and other possible ancient sites associated with Woodstock folklore traditions. Many of those are threatened by development.
- Echo Lake – A mountain lake within the Indian Head Wilderness of the Catskill Mountains.
- Judge Jonathan Hasbrouck House listed on the National Register of Historic Places in 2013.
- Lake Hill – A hamlet just west of Shady
- Mead's Meadow (Woodstock) – Formerly a cow pasture, "The Magic Meadow" is a quarter mile past the summit of Mead Mountain Road and the Karma Triyana Dharmachakra Tibetan Buddhist monastery. It is an entrance to the Devil's Path.
- Montoma – A hamlet south of Woodstock near the town line with the Town of Hurley.
- Mount Guardian – A mountain to the west of Overlook Mountain, below which is the hamlet of Shady.
- Mount Tobias – A mountain in the central part of the town.
- National Youth Administration Woodstock Resident Work Center
- Ohayo Mountain – A mountain to the south, between the Ashokan Reservoir and Woodstock village, bordering West Hurley.
- Opus 40 – a large free-form sculpture carved out of the local bluestone by Harvey Fite in the Saugerties hamlet of High Woods, four miles from the central Woodstock hamlet.
- Overlook Mountain – A mountain to the northeast, on whose lower slopes much of Woodstock is situated.
- Phoenicia, NY – hamlet of Shandaken in Ulster County, New York - 13.5 miles west of Woodstock.
- Saugerties, New York – A nearby town that includes the 800-acre Winston Farm, a proposed site for Woodstock '69 and home to Woodstock '94, and host to the Garlic Festival and Horse Shows In The Sun (HITS) north of the village.
- Saw Kill – A stream that rises in Echo Lake, flows west through Shady, then south to Bearsville, east to Woodstock, and southeast to Zena on the way to its confluence with the Esopus Creek near Kingston.
- Shady – A hamlet northwest of Byrdcliffe, past the intersection of Glasco Turnpike and Route 212.
- Vosburg Turning Mill Complex
- Willow – A hamlet in the northwest part of the town on Route 212.
- Wittenberg – A hamlet at the junction of County Routes 40 and 45, southwest of Bearsville. It contains Yankeetown Pond and Kenneth Wilson State Campground.
- Woodstock – The hamlet of Woodstock and the principal center of local services for the town.
- Zena – A hamlet east of Woodstock hamlet in the southeast part of the town.

== Gallery ==
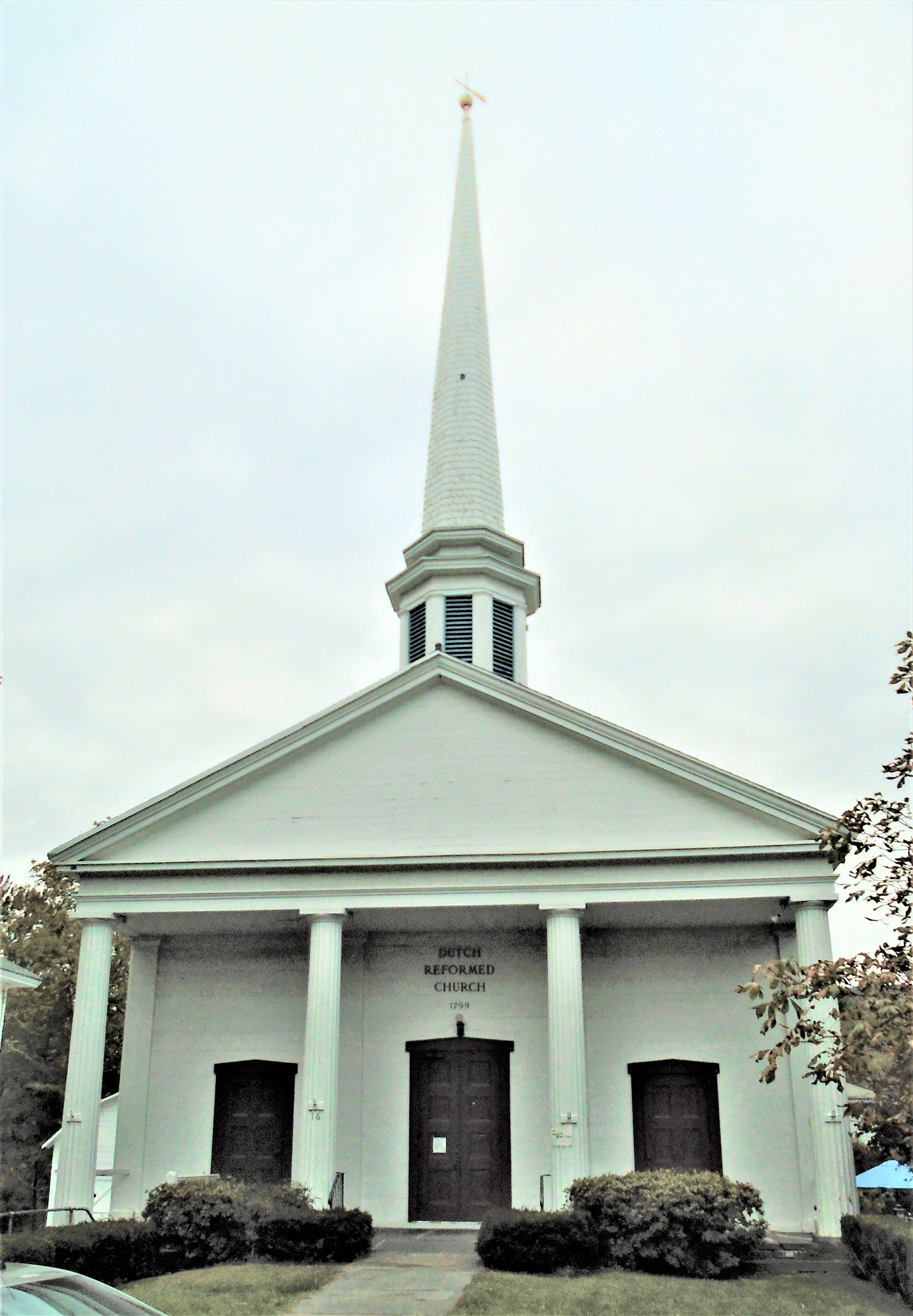
Dutch Reformed Church (1799)

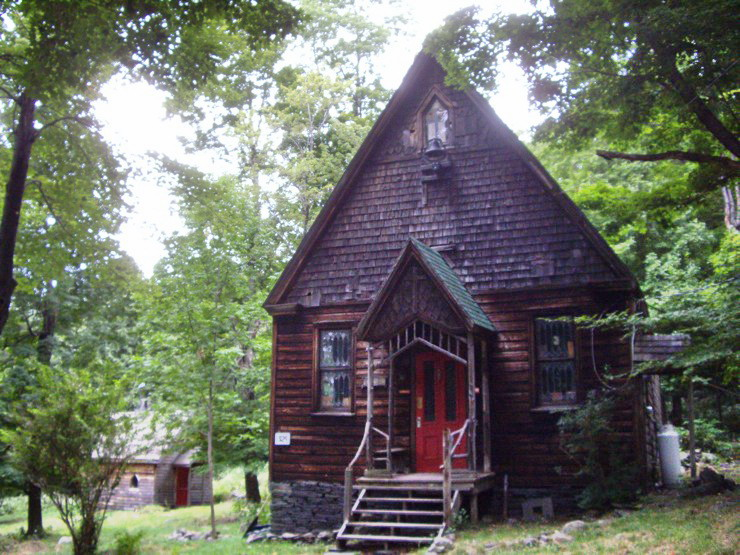
Church of the Holy Transfiguration of Christ-on-the-Mount (NRHP)

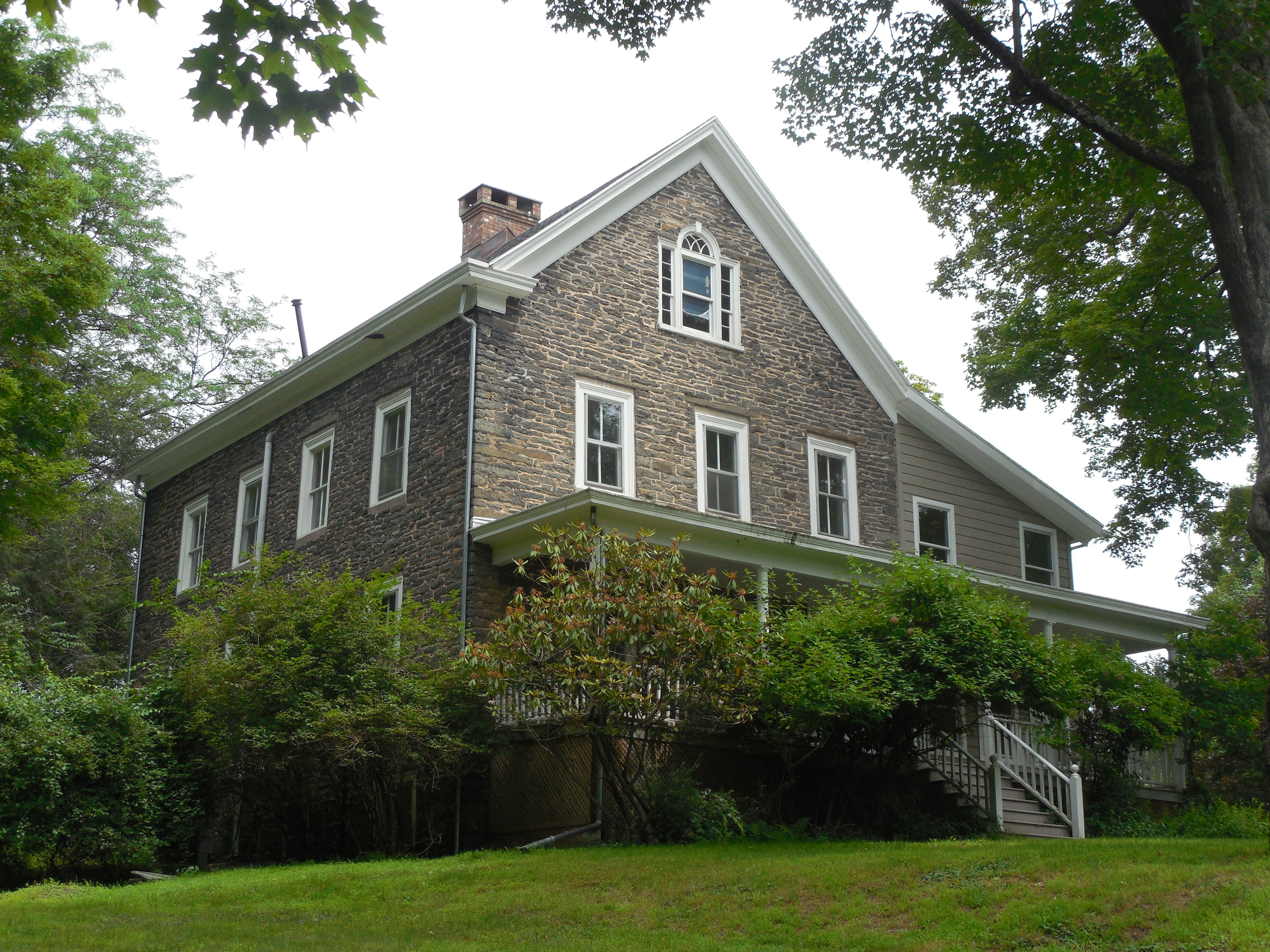
Judge Jonathan Hasbrouck House (NRHP)

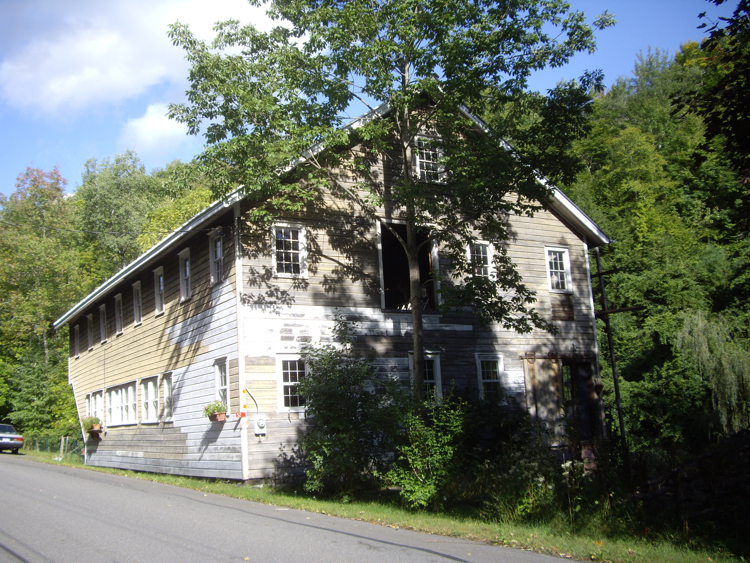
Vosburg Turning Mill Complex (NRHP)
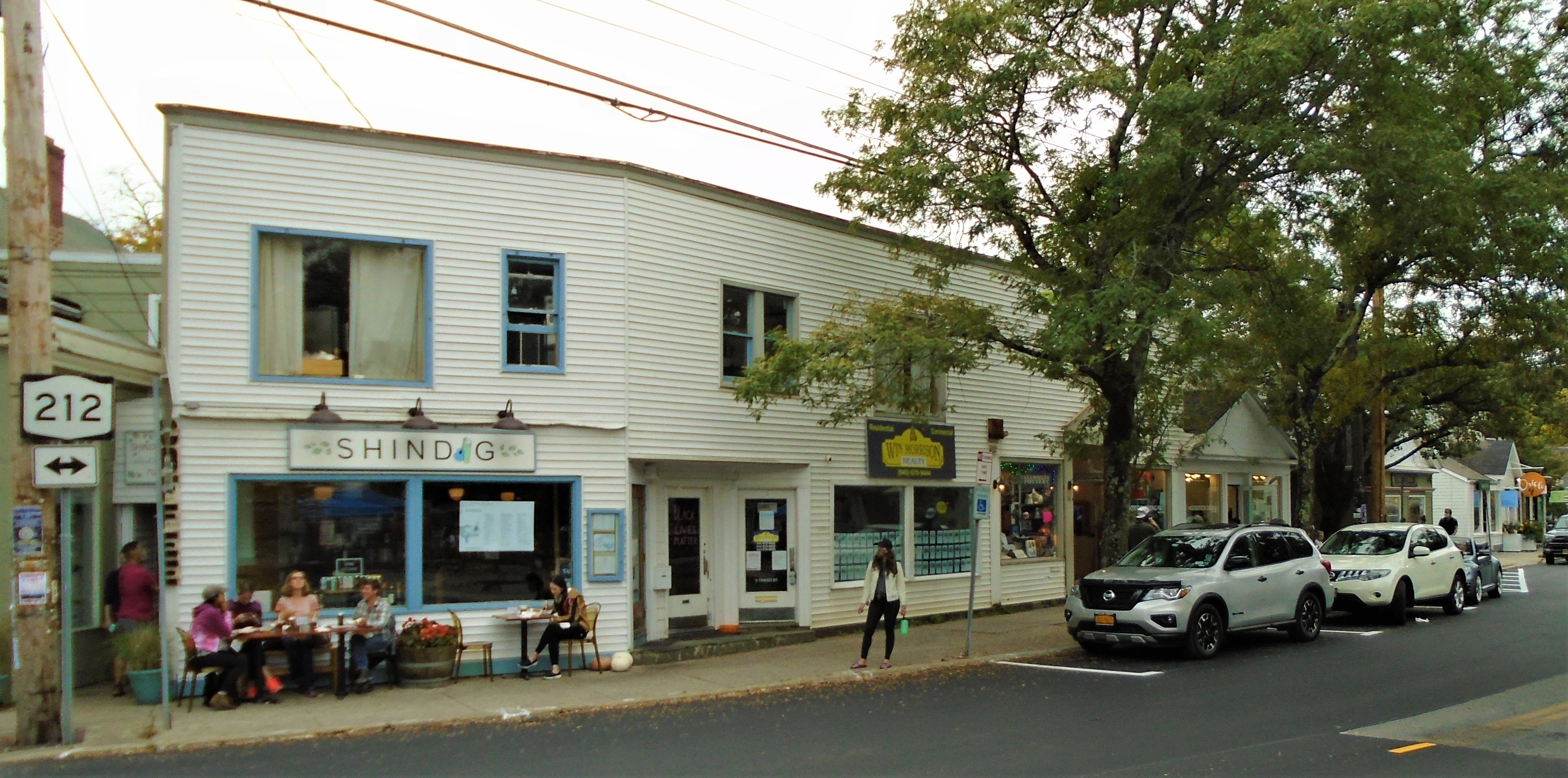
Tinker Street

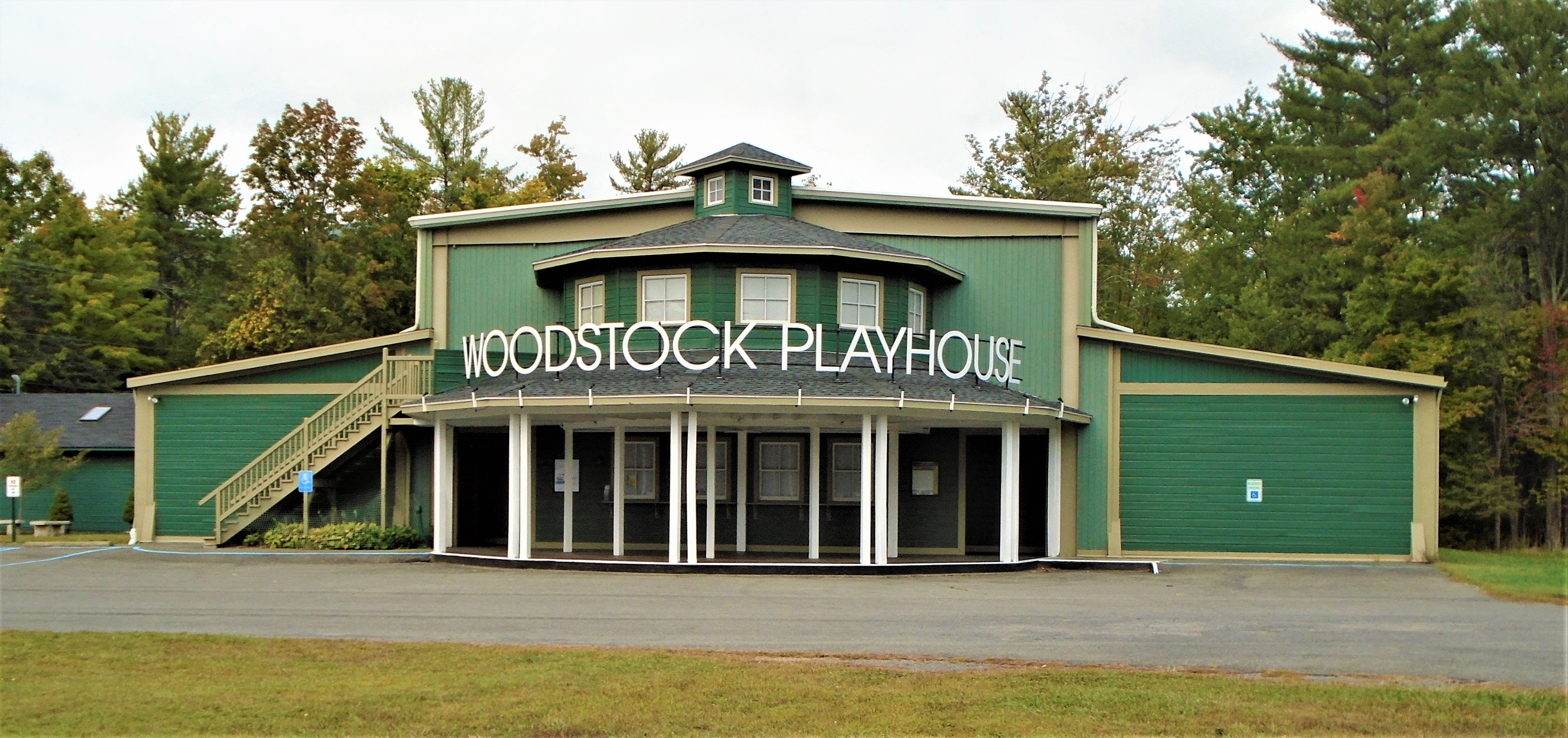
Woodstock Playhouse

== See also ==
- Bearsville, New York
