= Zulma Steele =

American artist (1881–1979)

- Born: Zulma Ripley Steele; July 7, 1881; Appleton, Wisconsin, United States
- Died: 1979 (aged 97–98); Westchester, New York, United States
- Education: Art Institute of Chicago; Pratt Institute; Boston Museum of Fine Arts School
- Known for: Painting, pottery, printmaking, furniture design, book design
- Movement: Arts and Crafts, Modernism
- Spouse: Nielson Parker (m. 1926–1928; his death)
- Relatives: Frederic Dorr Steele (brother), Julia C. R. Dorr (maternal grandmother)

Zulma Steele (1881–1979) was an American visual artist, and is one of the pioneering women of the Arts and Crafts movement and Modernism in New York. Arts journalist for the New York Times, Grace Glueck noted that Steele was a "progressive-minded artist and artisan whose work was considered avant-garde." She married a farmer, Nielson Parker, in 1926. After he died in 1928, Steele traveled extensively in Europe, Haiti, and the Bahamas. She returned to upstate New York and died in New Jersey, aged 98.

A retrospective exhibition, Zulma Steele: Artist/Craftswoman, was held in 2020 at the Kleinert/James Center for the Arts of the Woodstock Byrdcliffe Guild. The catalogue and accompanying essays constitute the most comprehensive scholarship on Steele's work to date.

== Early life ==
Born Zulma Ripley Steele, she was the youngest of three children born to Zulma De Lacy Steele, née Dorr, and William Henry Steele. Her siblings were Frederic Dorr Steele and Joseph Dorr Steele. Her maternal grandmother was writer Julia C. R. Dorr.

== Career ==
In the late 19th century, the Arts and Crafts movement grew in response to, and as rejection of, the rapid urbanization and mechanization of society during the Second Industrial Revolution. In the winter of 1902, construction of the Byrdcliffe Colony began on Mount Guardian outside of Woodstock, New York. The serene 1,500-acre commune was the brainchild of wealthy Englishman Ralph Radcliffe Whitehead. The son of a British textile Baron, Whitehead was attempting “to create a subsistence community of craftsmen,” wrote New York Times journalist Benjamin Genocchio in 2003. During the beginning of art production at Byrdcliffe, activity centered around the production of furniture.

Zulma Steele was one of the first residents at the Byrdcliffe Colony and was considered one of the most talented students to come there. In 1903, she and Edna Walker, who both had recently graduated from the Pratt Institute in Brooklyn, arrived in Woodstock to work in the furniture shop. Steele had long-time family ties to the Woodstock area. The two women made nature studies of local plant life for what became the iconic patterned-painted panels that were set into the larger Mission style furniture pieces. The types of objects made in the furniture shop at Byrdcliffe included tables, chairs, lamp stands, hanging shelves, bookcases, sideboards and chiffoniers. “Simple lines, delicate moldings, and planar surfaces characterized Byrdcliffe pieces and belie their solid construction,” wrote curator Peter Morrin in preparation for a 1977 exhibition on the Woodstock colonies.

Zulma Steele attended the 1913 Armory Show in New York City. Her immediate response to the European modern art is not known however the evolution of her art shows an impact. Professor of Art History at Bard College, Tom Wolf, noted that the "artists of Byrdcliffe practiced the most popular and accepted styles of the early twentieth century, and it is striking to see a sudden change around the time of the 1913 Armory Show." During World War I, Steele worked with the Red Cross in France. She studied in Paris with the Cubist André Lhote and took classes at the Académie de la Grande Chaumière and Académie Colarossi art schools. The influences of Cubism became evident in Steele's artwork.

In 1907, the Byrdcliffe Pottery opened. Zulma Steele worked there for many years and managed the facility for the last five of those years, until its closing in 1928. She then started her own line of pottery called, “Zedware.” Steele became a lifelong resident of the Woodstock area. She was described by her contemporary, the artist Bolton Brown, as “an outstanding lady both visually and in quality we call style.”

== Works ==
- Purple Hills, c. 1914, Oil on Board, 20.32 cm × 25.4 cm
- Drawing, Iris Desk Panel. 1904, Graphite and Color Pencil on Paper
- Drop Front Desk with 3 Iris Panels, 1904, Oil Paint and Green Stain on Cherry Wood.
- Byrdcliffe No. 4, c. 1914, Oil on Board, 20.32cm × 25.4cm 127.95 cm x 98.42 cm × 40.64 cm

== Exhibitions ==
- Boston Art College (1894, 1896, 1899)
- National Academy of Design (1891),
- Art Institute of Chicago
- National Arts Club (1914)
- Pennsylvania Academy of Fine Arts
- Boston Museum of Fine Art
- Baltimore Museum of Art
- Ohio University
- Indiana State University
- Paradox Gallery
- Woodstock, New York 1980s (solo)
- Milwaukee Art Museum (2020)
