= Voice Theatre =

Voice Theatre is a regional theater company located in Woodstock, New York and uses the Bethany Hall in Kingston, NY to stage its productions during their season. Director and playwright, Shauna Kanter, has been its artistic director since its inception.

== History ==
Originally calling themselves Voiceworks!, Voice Theatre was founded in Paris in 1988 by actress and director Shauna Kanter, who had been a voice teacher and professional actress in New York for 14 years. Voiceworks' inaugural production of Family Cycle took place in Paris and was directed by Kanter and included 30 actors. Later in 1989, Voice Theatre mounted an all-female music theatre production of Pushing Through at La MaMa in New York City and again in 1991 at Columbia Festival of the Arts. Pushing Through broke political ground by including Israeli and Palestinian actors in the same play, and starred Jackie Sawiris as one of the Arab actresses.

In 1995, Kanter and her group moved to the United Kingdom, where she collaborated and eventually married classical stage actor Robert Langdon Lloyd. Kanter wrote and directed a music theatre piece entitled Legacy, which premiered at the Bristol Old Vic theater company and went on to win the European Commission. In 1997 and 1998, Legacy performed across Germany and France.

In 2000, Voice Theatre returned to New York City and worked as an off-off-Broadway company across multiple venues. Legacy appeared at the T. Schreiber Studio in 2003. In 2006, Voice Theatre mounted a production of Retzach by Hanoch Levin at the off-Broadway theater 59E59 Theaters. The production starred Tony Naumovski. Kanter's next play, Birds on a Wire was inspired by Barack Obama and dealt with issues surrounding the Dust Bowl. It premiered at the Rattlestick Playwrights Theater, and later appeared at the Byrdcliffe Theater - the venue that would soon become their home.

== Byrdcliffe Theater ==
The Byrdcliffe Theater is a part of the Byrdcliffe Colony, an artist colony in Woodstock founded in 1902 by Ralph Radcliffe Whitehead and Jane Byrd McCall. The first production Voice Theatre staged at the Byrdcliffe Theater was a production of Brian Friel's play Lovers. In 2014, Voice Theater staged a production there of Birds on a Wire, and in 2015, after agreeing to fund a renovation of the theater, Byrdcliffe Theater was made Voice Theater's permanent home. In 2015, they mounted a critically acclaimed production of Timberlake Wertenbaker's play, Our Country's Good.

In the summer of 2016, Voice Theatre produced End Days by Deborah Zoe Laufer, starring Joe Bongiorno.
