= Mount Prater =

Mountain in the state of California

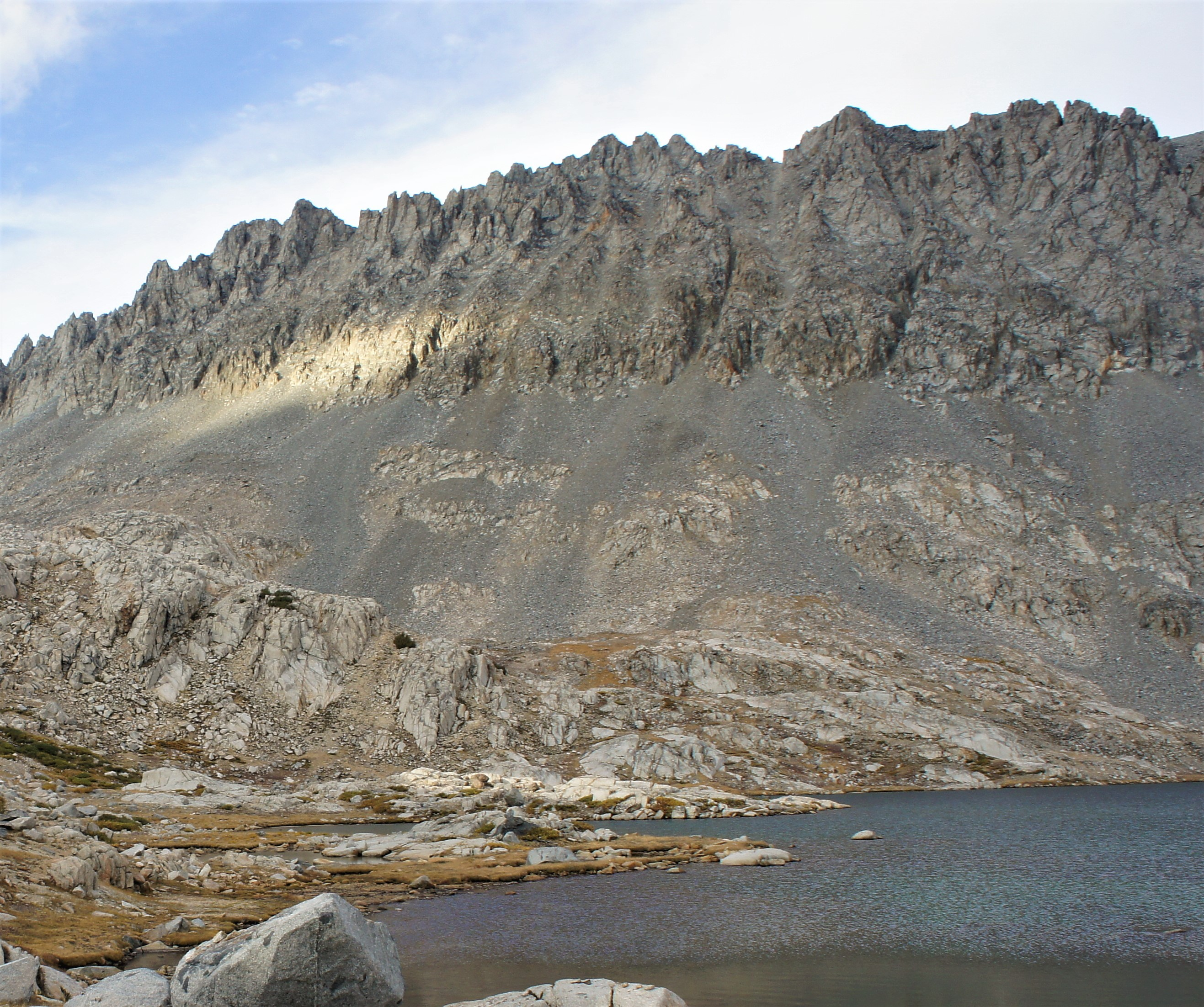
- Southwest aspect

Highest point
- Elevation: 13,471 ft (4,106 m)
- Prominence: 85 ft (26 m)
- Parent peak: Mount Bolton Brown (13,491 ft)
- Isolation: 0.74 mi (1.19 km)
- Listing: Sierra Peaks Section; Vagmarken Club Sierra Crest List
- Coordinates: 37°02′12″N 118°26′05″W

Naming
- Etymology: Alfred William Prater

Geography
- Location within California Location within the United States
- Location: Kings Canyon National Park; Fresno / Inyo Counties; California, U.S.
- Parent range: Sierra Nevada
- Topo map: USGS Split Mountain

Geology
- Rock age: Cretaceous
- Mountain type: Fault block
- Rock type: Granodiorite

Climbing
- First ascent: 1928
- Easiest route: class 2 Southeast ridge

Mount Prater is a 13,471-foot-elevation (4,106-meter) mountain summit located on the shared border of Fresno County and Inyo County in California, United States.

== Description ==
The peak is set on the crest of the Sierra Nevada mountain range, just south of the Palisades area. It is also situated on the boundary shared by Kings Canyon National Park and John Muir Wilderness. Precipitation runoff from this mountain drains east to Tinemaha Reservoir via Tinemaha Creek, and south into headwaters of South Fork Kings River. Topographic relief is significant as the summit rises 2,100 feet (640 meters) above Tinemaha Lake in one mile.

== Climbing ==
The John Muir Trail, which passes below the western base of the peak, provides a climbing approach option. The first ascent of the summit was made in 1928 by Alfred William Prater and his wife. The North Ridge was first climbed by Fred L. Jones on October 6, 1948. "Obvious Chute" was first climbed March 19, 1972, by Ed Treacy, Karl Bennett, Dave Gladstone, Dave King, Vi Grasso and Doug Mantle. "Hidden Couloir" on the East Face was first climbed by Del Johns and Wayne N. Sawka in late September 1980. Inclusion on the Sierra Peaks Section peakbagging list generates climbing interest in this peak.

== Etymology ==
This landform's name commemorates Alfred William Prater (1902–1929), mathematics professor at University of California and the mountaineer who was first to climb this peak with his wife in the summer of 1928. The toponym was officially adopted in 1930 by the United States Board on Geographic Names.

== Climate ==
Mount Prater is located in an alpine climate zone. Most weather fronts originate in the Pacific Ocean, and travel east toward the Sierra Nevada mountains. As fronts approach, they are forced upward by the peaks (orographic lift), causing them to drop their moisture in the form of rain or snowfall onto the range.

== See also ==
- Sequoia-Kings Canyon Wilderness

== Gallery ==
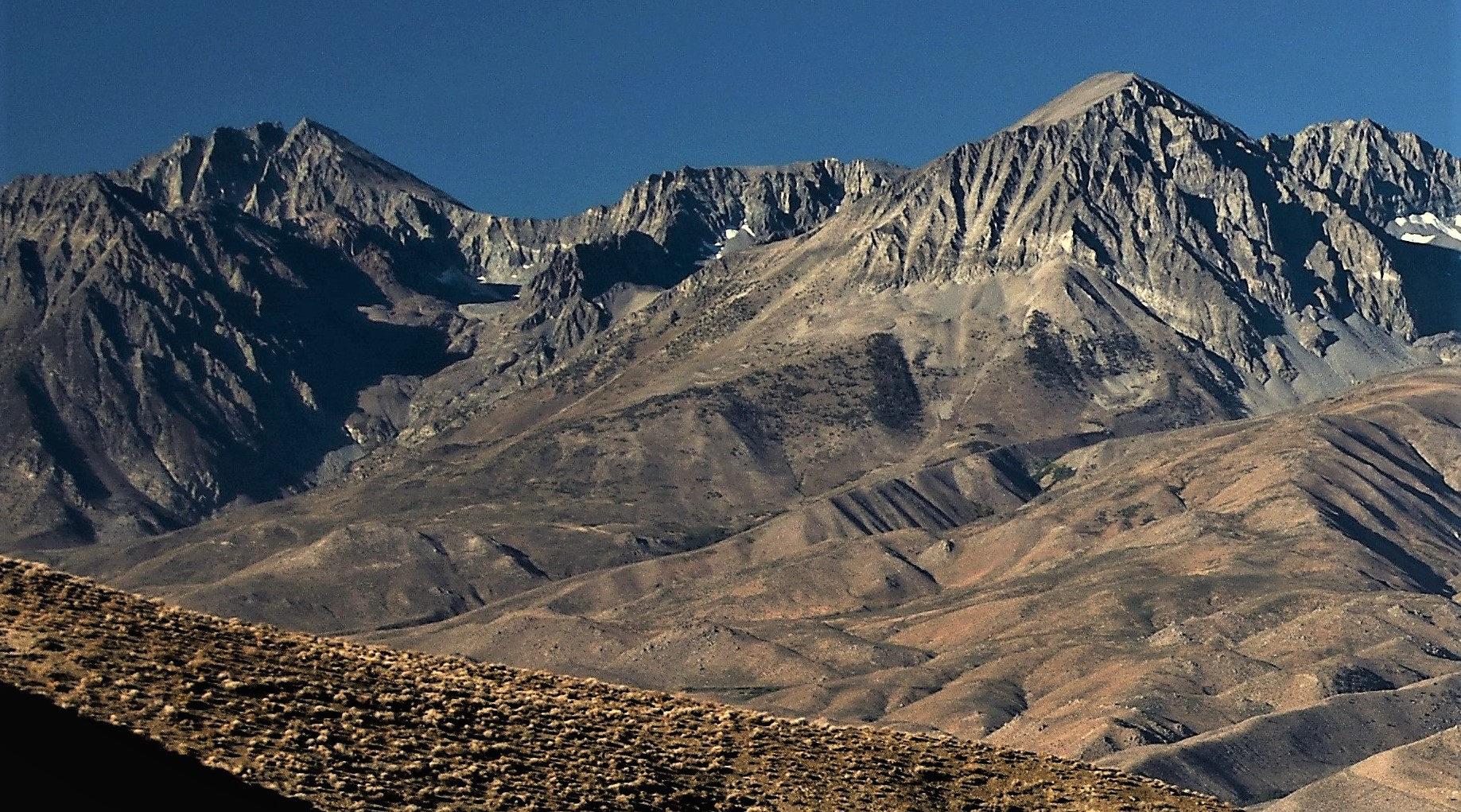
Mt. Prater centered between Split Mountain (left) and Birch Mountain (right). From northeast.

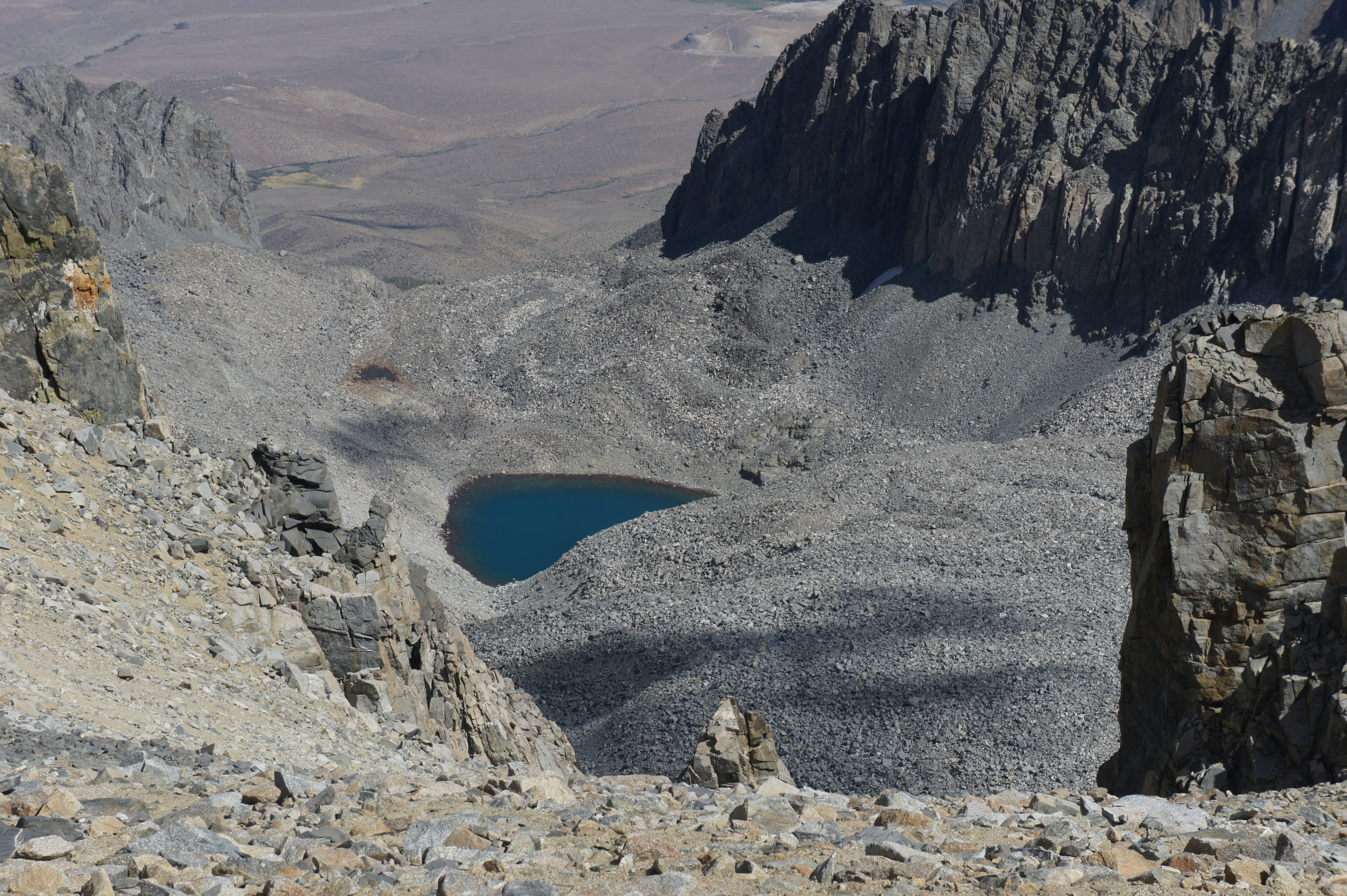
Tinemaha Lake seen from Mount Prater

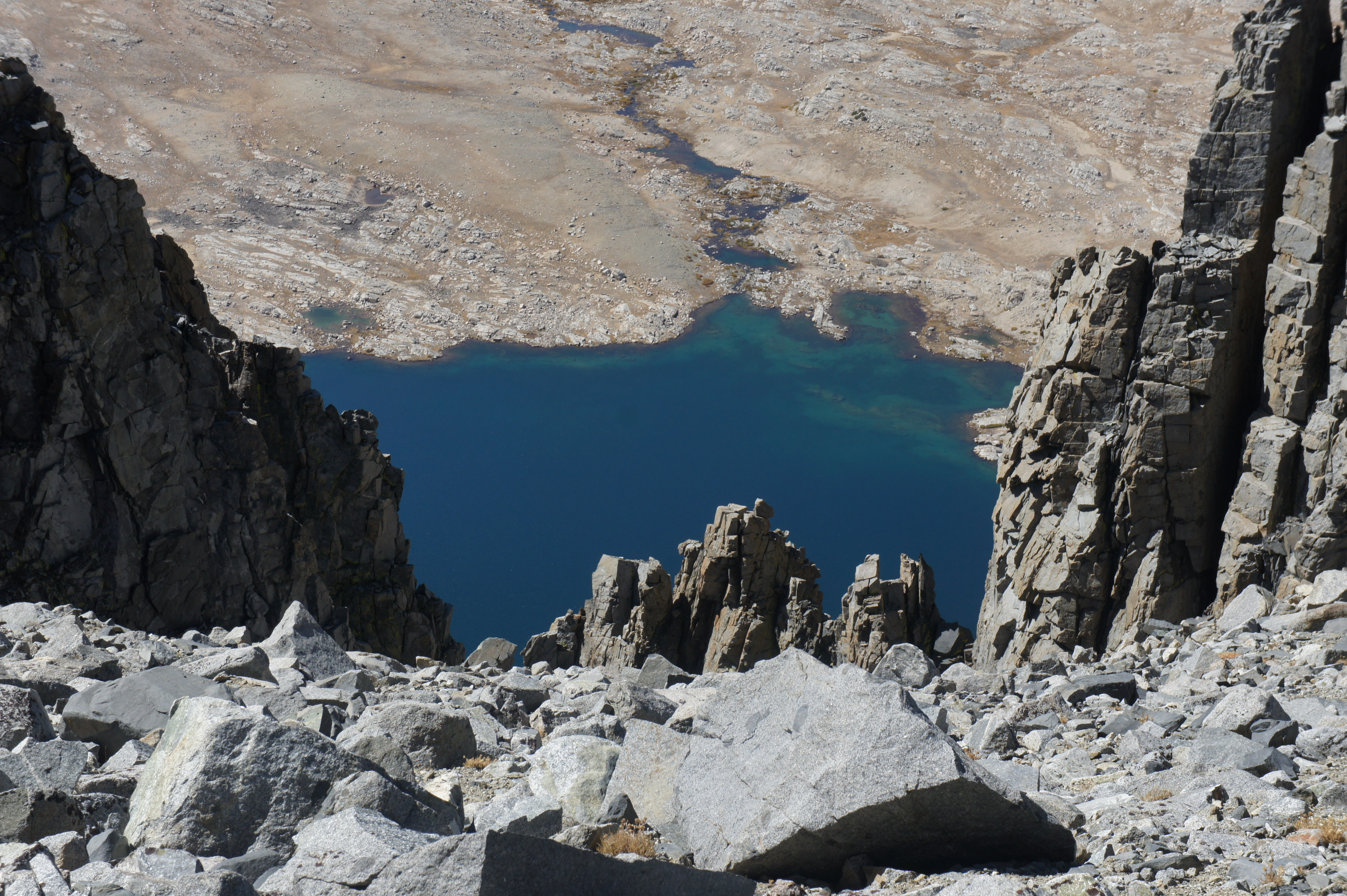
Lake 11597 seen from Mount Prater
