= Vosburg Turning Mill Complex =

- U.S. National Register of Historic Places
- U.S. Historic district
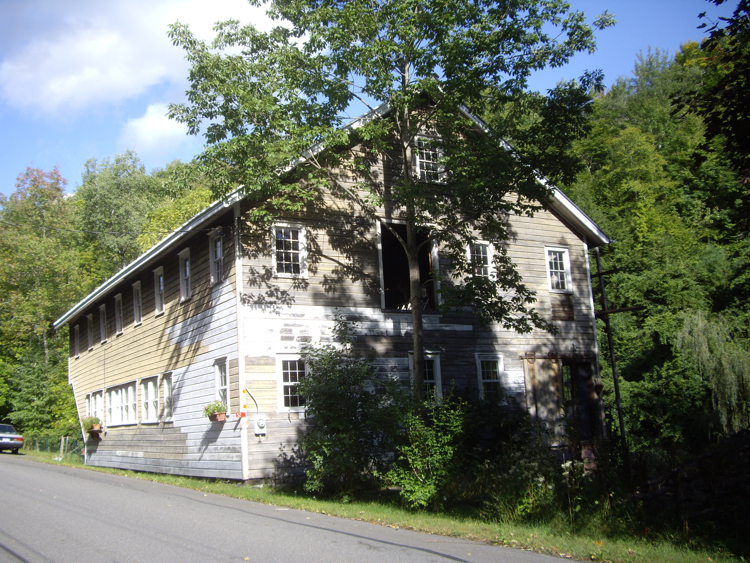

- Location within New York Location within the United States
- Location: 52 Hutchin Hill Road, Woodstock, NY, United States
- Coordinates: 42°4′13.27″N 74°13′55.36″W
- Area: 5 acres (2.0 ha)
- Built: 1899
- NRHP reference No.: 02001120
- Added to NRHP: October 10, 2002

Vosburg Turning Mill is a historic turning mill complex located near Woodstock, Ulster County, New York. The complex includes the large two-story, L-shaped timber frame mill (1899) and two associate dwellings.

It was added to the National Register of Historic Places in 2000.
