= Trojan Peak =

Mountain in California, United States

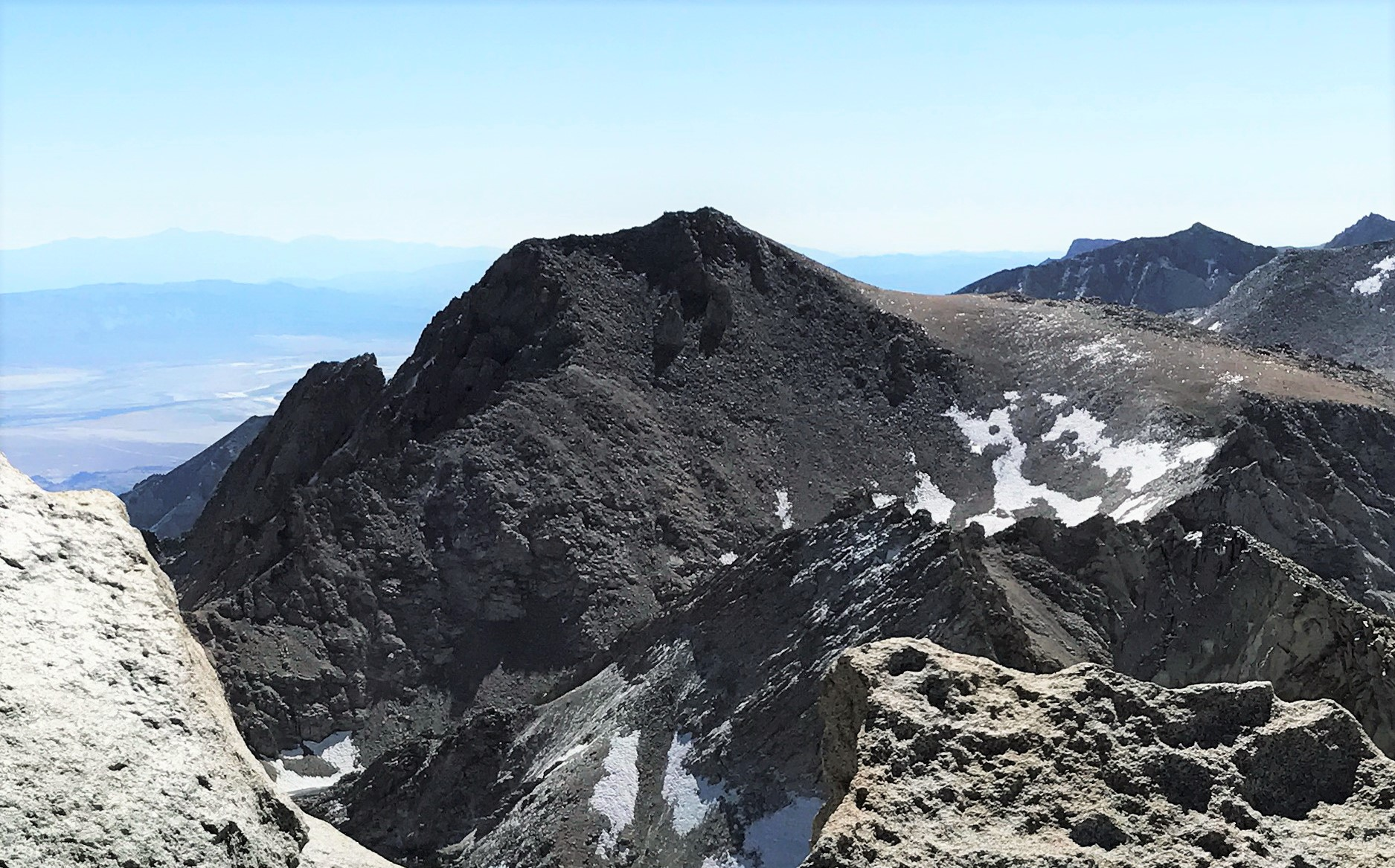
- Northwest aspect, from Mt. Tyndall

Highest point
- Elevation: 13,947 ft (4,251 m)
- Prominence: 364 ft (111 m)
- Parent peak: Mount Barnard
- Isolation: 0.84 mi (1.35 km)
- Listing: Sierra Peaks Section
- Coordinates: 36°38′32″N 118°18′55″W

Naming
- Etymology: USC Trojans

Geography
- Location within California Location within the United States
- Location: Inyo County, California, U.S.
- Parent range: Sierra Nevada
- Topo map: USGS Mount Williamson

Geology
- Rock age: Cretaceous
- Mountain type: Fault block
- Rock type: granitic

Climbing
- First ascent: 1926
- Easiest route: Simple scramble class 2

Trojan Peak is a 13,947-foot-elevation (4,251-meter) mountain summit located along the crest of the Sierra Nevada mountain range in Inyo County, California. It is situated in the John Muir Wilderness, on land managed by Inyo National Forest. It is 15 miles (24 km) west-northwest of the community of Lone Pine, 0.7 miles (1.1 km) southeast of Mount Versteeg, and one mile (1.6 km) south-southwest of Mount Williamson, the nearest higher neighbor. Trojan Peak is ranked as the 16th highest peak in California. Topographic relief is significant as it rises 1,427 feet (435 meters) above Lake Helen of Troy in approximately one-half mile.

== History ==
The first ascent of the summit was made June 26, 1926, by Norman Clyde, who is credited with 130 first ascents, most of which were in the Sierra Nevada. The peak's name was proposed by Chester Versteeg of the Sierra Club, and officially adopted by the United States Board on Geographic Names in 1951. As the first chairman the Sierra Club's Committee on Geographic Names, Versteeg was responsible for the naming of 250 geographical features in the Sierra Nevada, including Trojan Peak and Lake Helen of Troy, which he named for his alma mater, University of Southern California.

== Climate ==
According to the Köppen climate classification system, Trojan Peak has an alpine climate. Most weather fronts originate in the Pacific Ocean, and travel east toward the Sierra Nevada mountains. As fronts approach, they are forced upward by the peaks, causing them to drop their moisture in the form of rain or snowfall onto the range (orographic lift). Precipitation runoff from this mountain drains east to Owens Valley via George Creek.

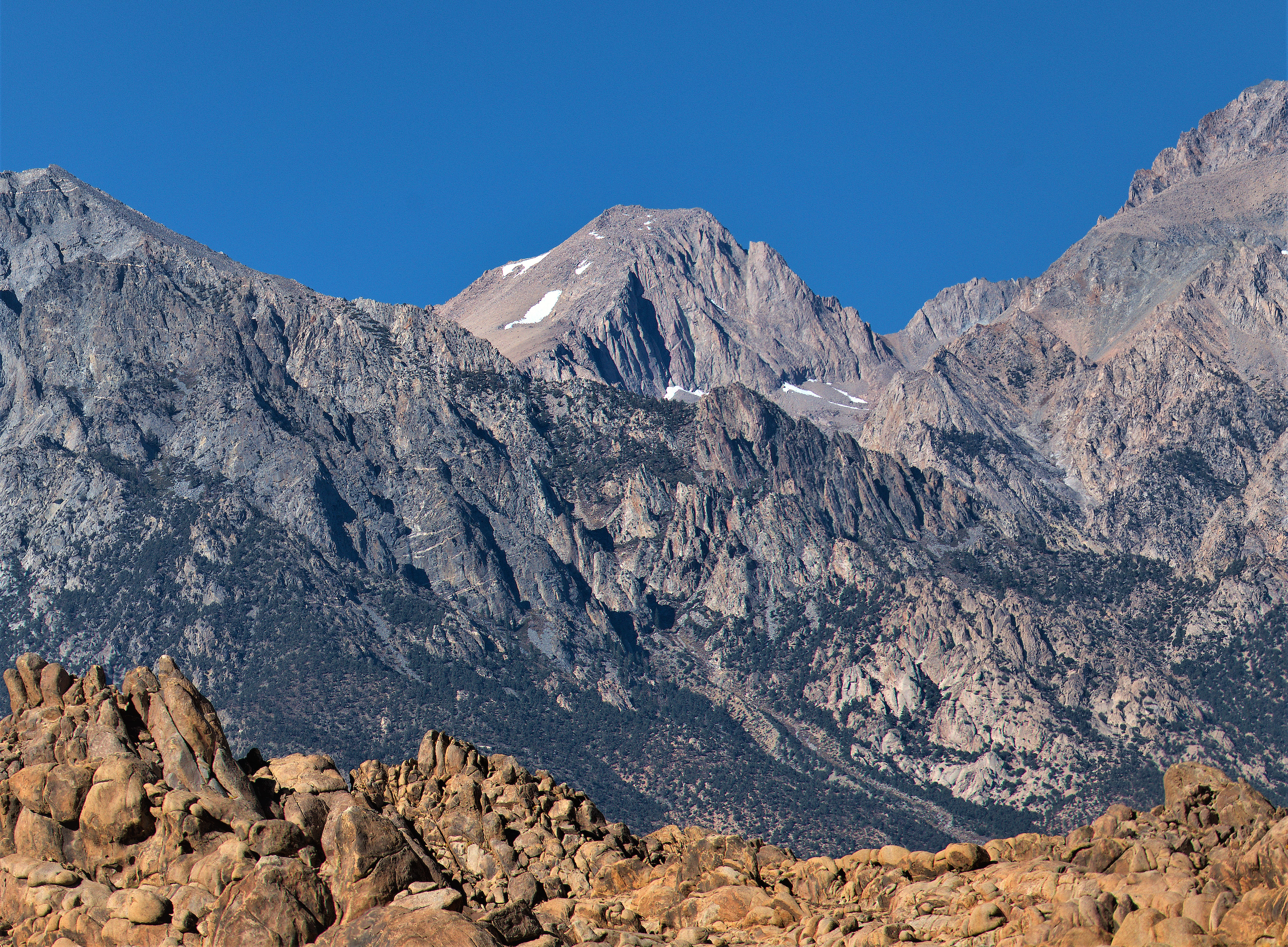
Trojan Peak, east aspect from Owens Valley

== See also ==
- List of mountain peaks of California
