= Jane Byrd McCall Whitehead =

American artist (1858–1955)

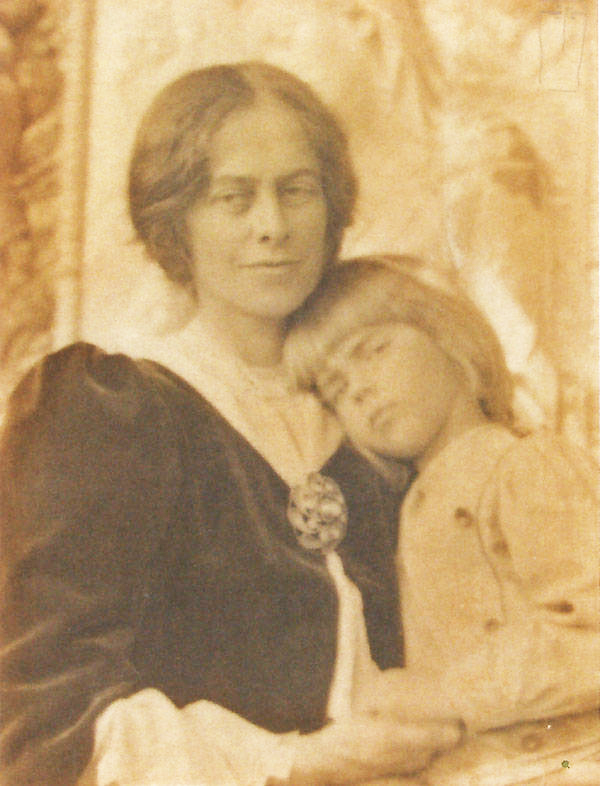
- Whitehead and her son Peter, 1905
- Born: Jane Byrd McCall; September 22, 1858; Philadelphia, US
- Died: September 22, 1955 (aged 97); Kingston, New York, US
- Spouse: Ralph Radcliffe Whitehead

Jane Byrd McCall Whitehead (September 22, 1858 – September 22, 1955) was an American artist, photographer and aesthete.

== Biography ==
Whitehead was born on September 22, 1858, in Philadelphia, to Jane Byrd Mercer and former Philadelphia mayor Peter McCall. She studied art with John Ruskin at the Académie Julian in Paris, and in 1886 while travelling with her parents through Europe, she was presented to Queen Victoria. In 1892, she married Ralph Radcliffe Whitehead. With her husband, she founded Byrdcliffe, an arts and crafts colony that opened in 1903. In 2004, her work was the subject of a one-person show, Jane Byrd McCall Whitehead's (1861–1955) Idealized Visions About Simple Living and the Arts and Crafts, at the Georgia Museum of Art. As an aesthete, her work and sensibilities "demonstrate how the visual and aesthetic qualities of artistic living and the "simple" life evolved throughout [her] lifetime". She died on September 22, 1955, aged 97, in Kingston, New York.

Whitehead's work is included in the collection of the Smithsonian American Art Museum and the Layton Art Collection of the Milwaukee Museum of Art.
