= Hervey White =

American poet (1866–1944)

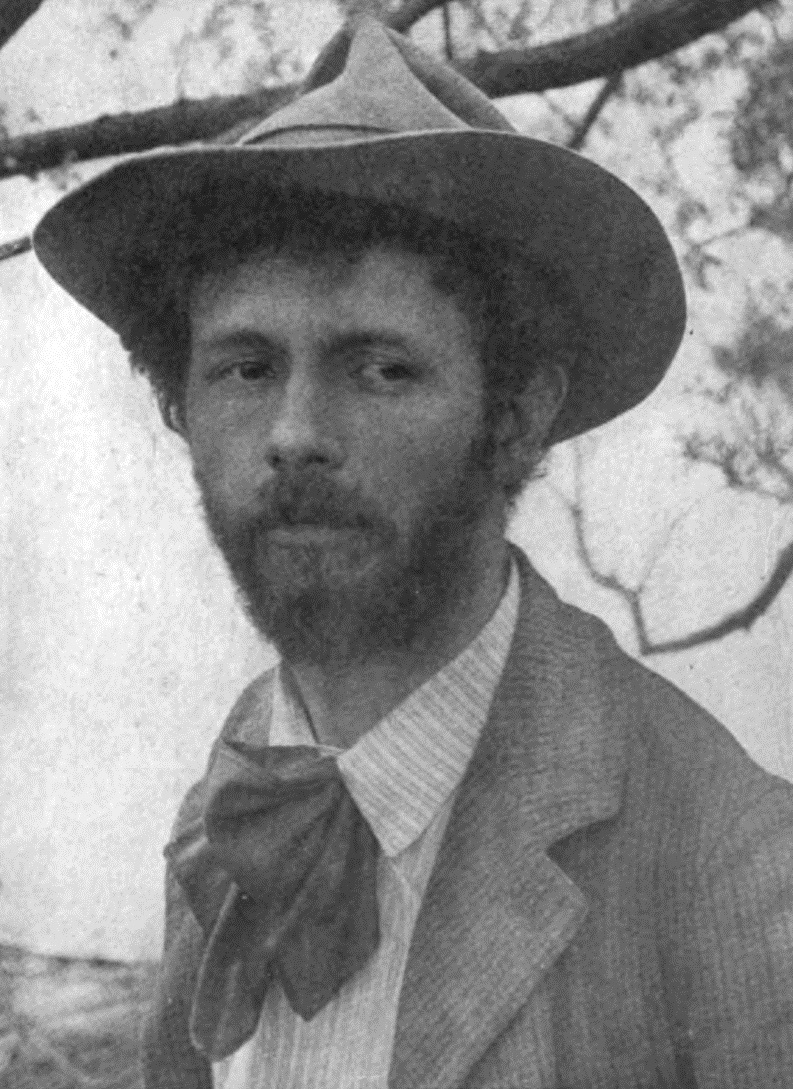
- Born: November 26, 1866; New London, Iowa
- Died: October 20, 1944 (aged 77); Woodstock, New York
- Education: Harvard University
- Occupations: Artist, entrepreneur

Hervey White (1866–1944) was an American novelist, poet, and community-builder. He was one of the original founders of the Byrdcliffe Colony in Woodstock, New York, then went on to create a more radical artists' colony, the Maverick. Both Byrdcliffe and the Maverick are part of what is today called the Woodstock Art Colony.

== Before Woodstock ==
White was born in Iowa and raised on a Kansas farm by his aunt after his mother died. A scholarship to Harvard University, where he read the works of the socially conscious art critic John Ruskin (1819–1900), solidified his burgeoning libertarian ideals. Pinpointing White's anti-patrician identity, artist and Byrdcliffe cofounder Bolton Brown (1864–1936) would describe White as "far prouder of hailing from a ranch in Kansas" than from Harvard. After graduating and traveling through parts of Italy, White moved to Chicago and worked for Hull House, a settlement that provided a creative and educational environment for poor residents of the surrounding neighborhoods. In its spirit of democratic cultural outreach, Hull House acted as a model for White's Maverick Colony. While at Hull House, White wrote his first novel, Differences (1899).

== Byrdcliffe and the Maverick ==
In 1902 White joined forces with Ralph Radcliffe Whitehead (1854–1929) and painter-lithographer Bolton Brown to found the Byrdcliffe Colony in Woodstock, New York, conceived as a utopian community of studios, workshops, and artistic gatherings which would nurture creative freedom in the idyllic setting of the Catskill Mountains. Byrdcliffe was based on models provided by the Arts and Crafts movement in England, including Ruskin's own unsuccessful artists' colony, St. George. However, shortly after the colony's establishment, Brown and White each parted ways with Whitehead—White by choice, while Brown was terminated. Each found the aristocratic but reform-minded Whitehead's version of democracy too rigorously structured.

In 1905, White purchased a farm just outside Woodstock with Fritz van der Loo and Carl Eric Lindin, intended as a rustic haven for the three friends and their families. It quickly transformed into an intellectual meeting place and was named the Maverick; artists, writers, and musicians took up residence in minimalistic houses, usually little more than shacks, built on the property. White's short-lived marriage to Byrdcliffe printmaker Vivian Bevans ended in 1908; White's homosexual leanings, addressed overtly in his writings, are a possible cause. White would go on to build the Maverick into a thriving community with makeshift studios, a printing press, and a steady output of publications devoted to literature and the visual arts, most notably The Wild Hawk and The Plowshare.

== The Maverick Festivals and Concerts ==
In 1915, White planned the first of the Maverick Festivals, which included music and theatrical performances. Bacchanalian and raucous but with a firmly creative underpinning, the Maverick Festivals were the precursors to the famous Woodstock Music Festival of 1969. Revelers were encouraged to come in costume; period photographs include men and women with flowers in their hair, a historical prototype for the popular cliché of the Woodstock hippie. Intended to offset the tremendous debt White incurred building his colony, the first Maverick Festival represented a great spirit of unity among previously feuding community activists and artists, who in 1919 went on to form the Woodstock Artists Association. The festivals were by the 1920s an annual occurrence, in August on the night of the full moon: they lasted until 1931, when their reputation for wildness (numbers of attendees reached, according to some reports, as many as 6000) pressured White to put an end to his tradition.

In 1916 White began sponsoring concerts, primarily classical music; the Maverick concert hall has been home to performances by Paul Robeson and John Cage. Cage's notorious 4'33" premiered there in 1952. The Maverick Concerts music festival continues to this day, with a series of concerts held every weekend from late June through early September. It is the oldest continuous summer music festival in the United States.

Hervey White's historical legacy is as an author, utopian, and philosopher. In popular press and local culture, his long hair, beard, baggy white linens and purple silks are celebrated as the hallmarks of Woodstock's cultural identity.
