= Mount Bolton Brown =

Mountain in the state of California

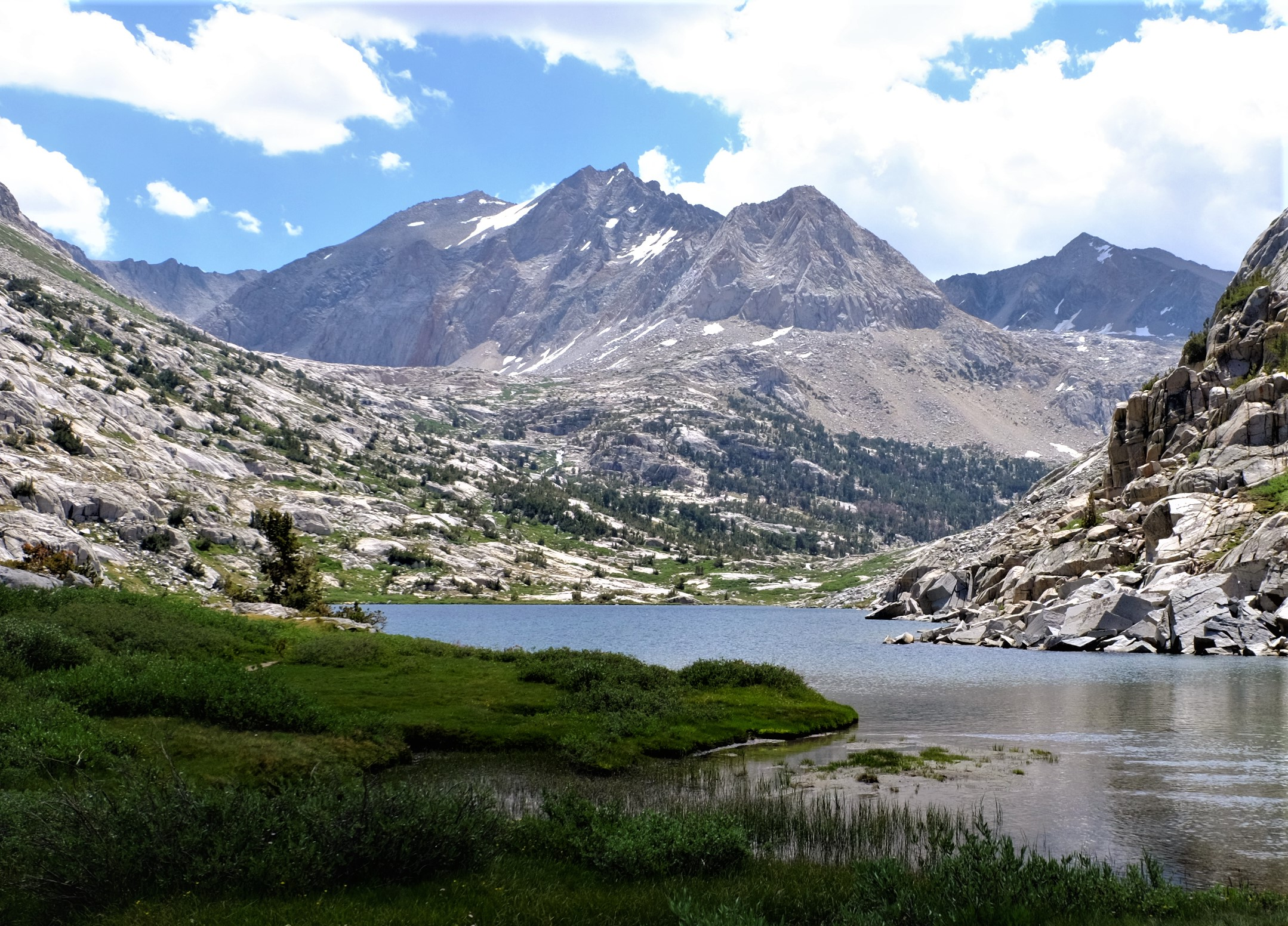
- West aspect, from Palisade Lakes

Highest point
- Elevation: 13,491 ft (4,112 m)
- Prominence: 598 ft (182 m)
- Parent peak: Ed Lane Peak (13,577 ft)
- Isolation: 1.02 mi (1.64 km)
- Listing: Sierra Peaks Section; Vagmarken Club Sierra Crest List
- Coordinates: 37°02′46″N 118°26′28″W

Naming
- Etymology: Bolton Brown

Geography
- Location within California Location within the United States
- Location: Kings Canyon National Park; Fresno / Inyo Counties; California, U.S.
- Parent range: Sierra Nevada
- Topo map: USGS Split Mountain

Geology
- Rock age: Cretaceous
- Mountain type: Fault block
- Rock type: Granodiorite

Climbing
- First ascent: 1922
- Easiest route: class 3 scrambling

Mount Bolton Brown is a 13,491-foot-elevation (4,112-meter) mountain summit located on the shared border of Fresno County and Inyo County in California, United States.

== Description ==
The peak is set on the crest of the Sierra Nevada mountain range, just south of the Palisades area. It is also situated on the boundary shared by Kings Canyon National Park and John Muir Wilderness. Mount Bolton Brown ranks as the 64th-highest peak in California. Precipitation runoff from this mountain drains east to Tinemaha Reservoir via Tinemaha Creek; south into headwaters of South Fork Kings River; and northwest to Palisade Creek which is a tributary of the Middle Fork Kings River. Topographic relief is significant as the summit rises 4,500 feet (1,400 meters) above Tinemaha Creek in 2.5 miles.

== Climbing ==
The John Muir Trail, which passes below the western base of the peak, provides a climbing approach option. The first ascent of the summit was made August 14, 1922, by Chester Versteeg and Rudolph Berls by ascending the Northwest Ridge and descending the Southwest Slope. The North Slope was first climbed by Fred L. Jones on October 6, 1948. The South Ridge was first climbed March 19, 1972, by Ed Treacy, Karl Bennett, Dave Gladstone, Dave King, Vi Grasso and Doug Mantle. These climbing routes are non-technical, and inclusion on the Sierra Peaks Section peakbagging list generates climbing interest.

== Etymology ==
This landform's name remembers Bolton Coit Brown (1864–1936), an American painter, lithographer, and mountaineer. The year following his first ascent, Chester Versteeg wrote in the Sierra Club Bulletin: "Alt. of this mountain is 13,527. It stands at the junction of the Sequoia, Sierra and Inyo Nat. Forests. We hereby name it 'Mt. Bolton Brown' in honor of Bolton C. Brown of the Sierra Club, who was the first to explore, map and write of the Upper Basin of the So. Fork of the Kings River." Bolton Brown was a charter member of the Sierra Club, and wrote several stories for the club about his explorations in the Sierras, including the area this mountain rises from. The toponym has been officially adopted by the United States Board on Geographic Names.

== Climate ==
Mount Bolton Brown is located in an alpine climate zone. Most weather fronts originate in the Pacific Ocean, and travel east toward the Sierra Nevada mountains. As fronts approach, they are forced upward by the peaks (orographic lift), causing them to drop their moisture in the form of rain or snowfall onto the range.

== See also ==
- Sequoia-Kings Canyon Wilderness

== Gallery ==
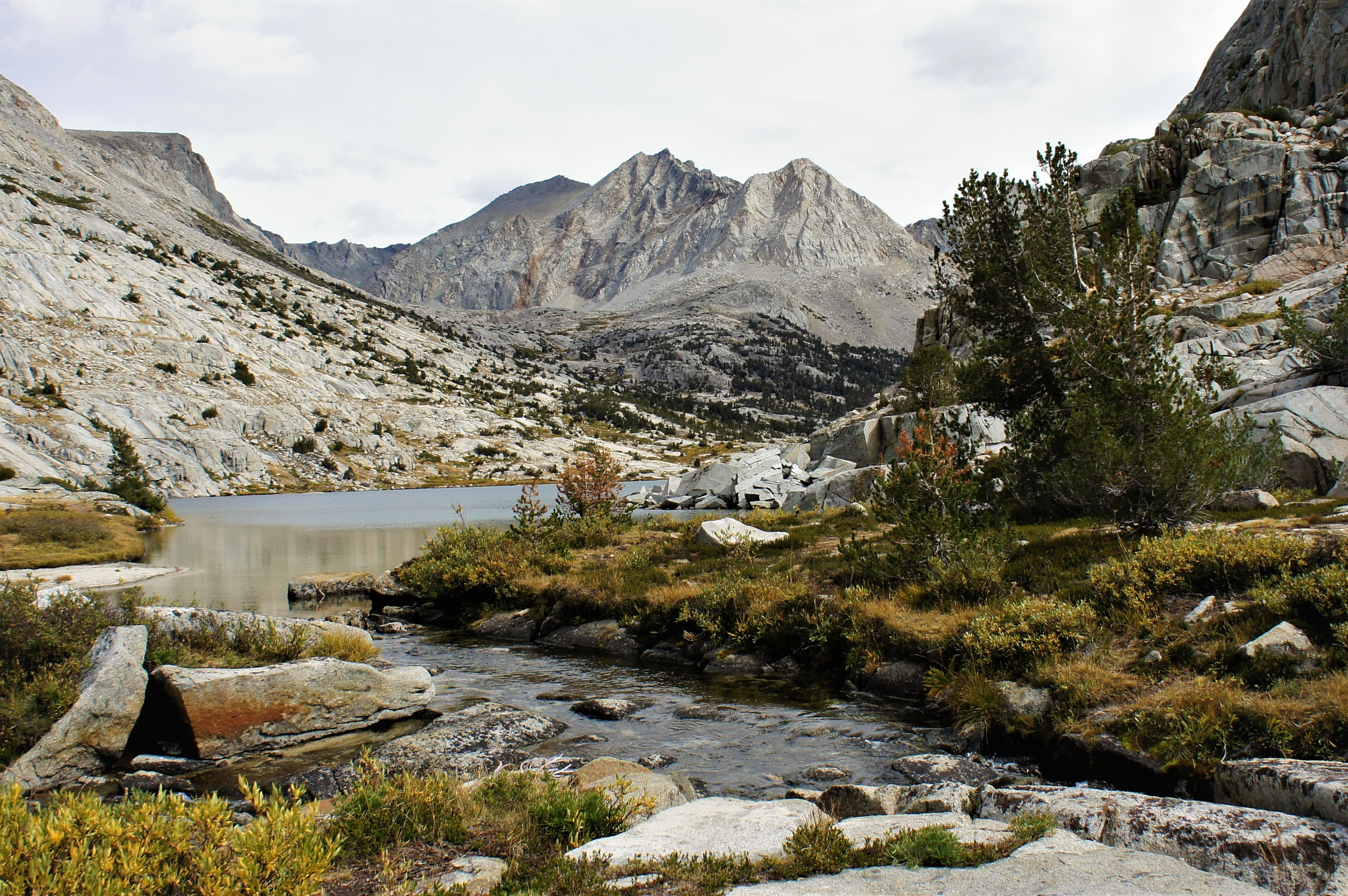
West aspect of Mt. Bolton Brown from Lower Palisade Lake

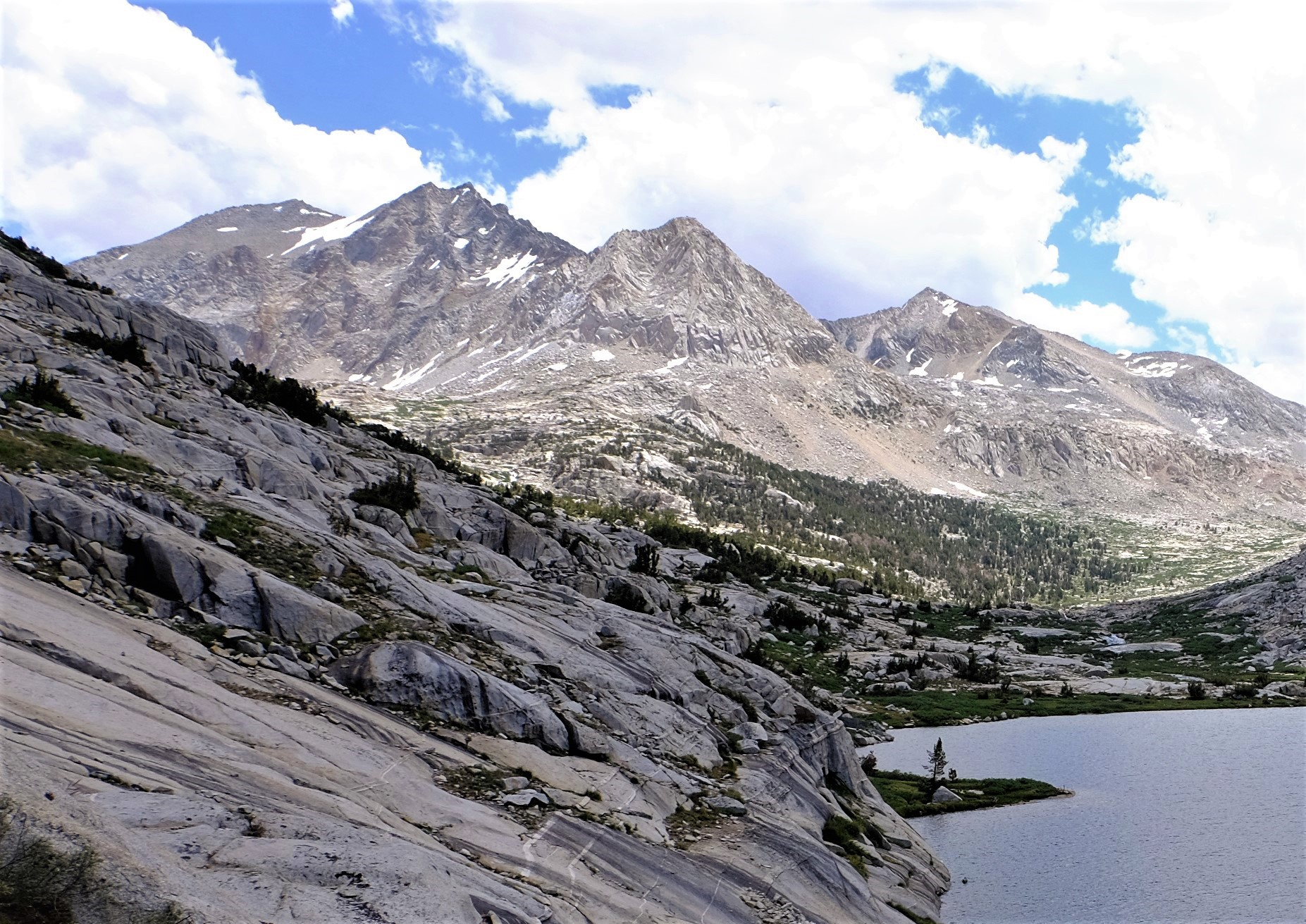
Mt. Bolton Brown - upper left corner

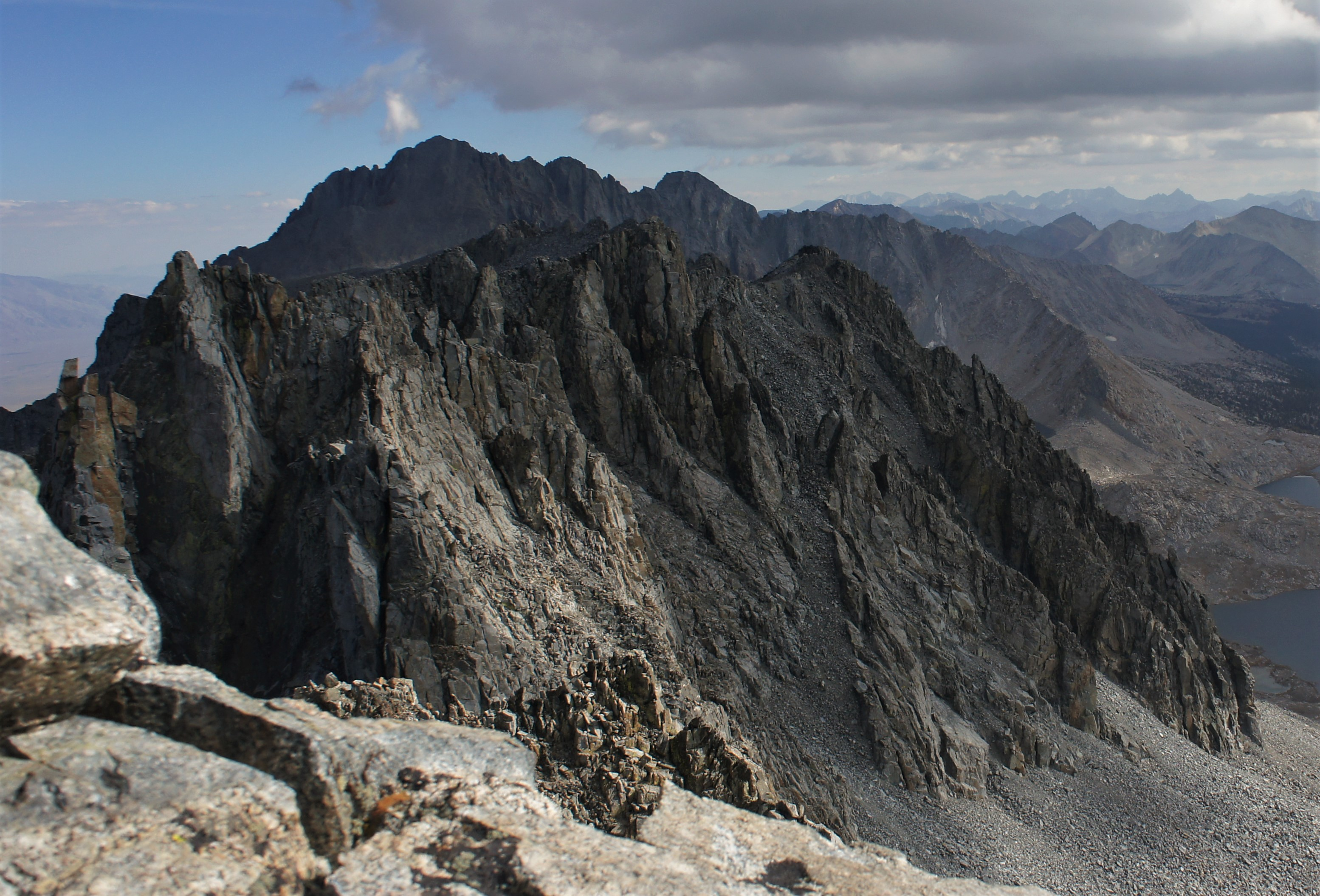
View from the summit of Mt. Bolton Brown looking SSE to Mt. Prater and Split Mountain.
