= Judge Jonathan Hasbrouck House =

Historic house in New York, United States

- U.S. National Register of Historic Places
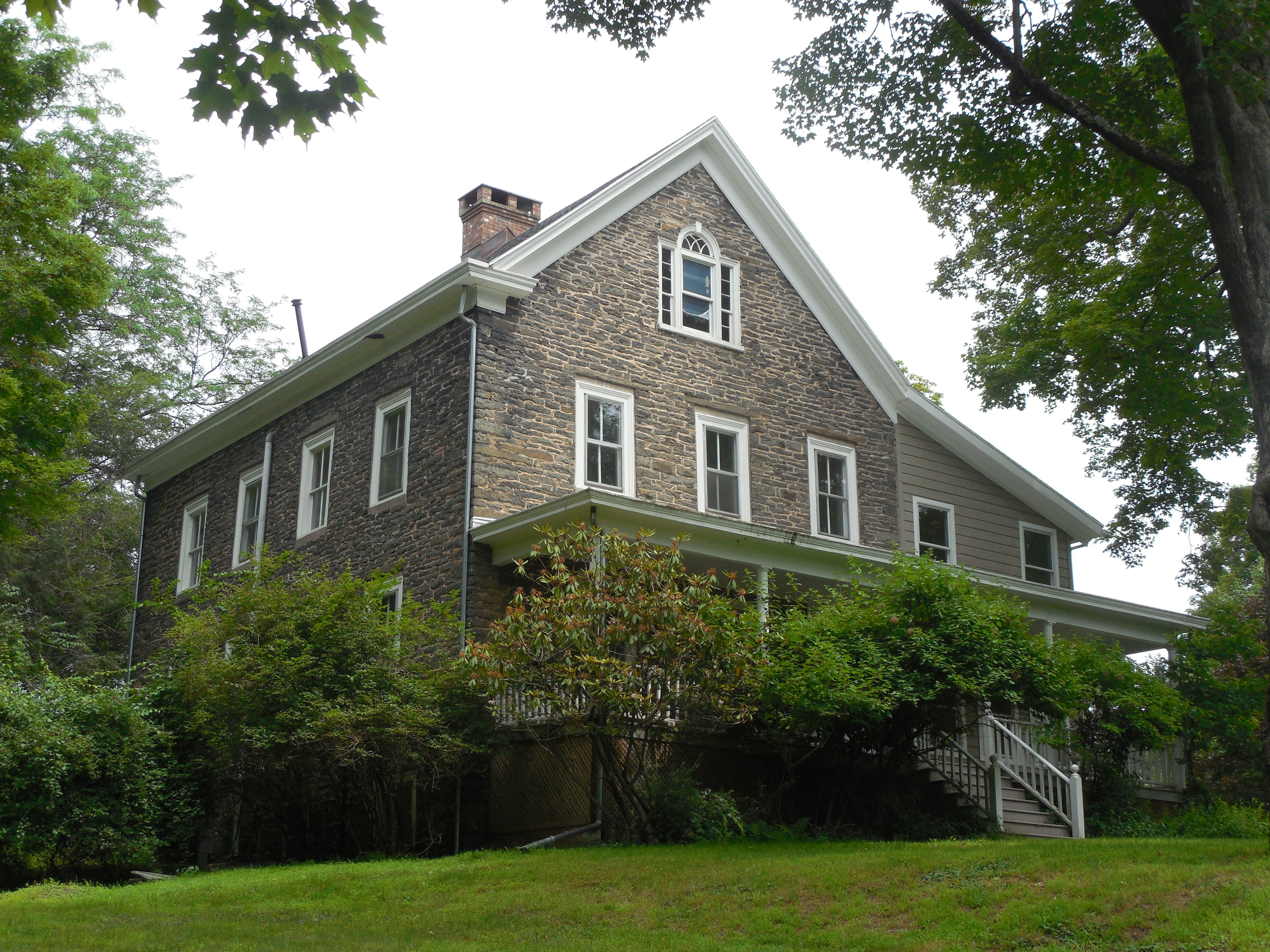

- Location within New York Location within the United States
- Location: 20 Elwyn Lane, Woodstock, New York
- Coordinates: 42°02′29″N 74°06′49″W
- Area: 2.23 acres (0.90 ha)
- Built: c. 1800, c. 1875, c. 1900
- Architect: Pembroke, Ali
- Architectural style: Federal
- NRHP reference No.: 13000056
- Added to NRHP: March 6, 2013

The Judge Jonathan Hasbrouck House, also known as the Sherman-Elwyn-Jonathan Hasbrouck House, is a historic home located at Woodstock, Ulster County, New York. It was built circa 1800, and is a two-story, three bay by four bay, Federal style, bluestone dwelling constructed with load-bearing walls upon a raised basement. It has a gable roof and front porch that was added around 1900. Adjoining the eastern elevation of the house is a wooden frame addition also on a bluestone foundation that was built about 1875. The addition exhibits modern construction techniques since its renovation after a fire that had damaged both sections of the house. The original roof pitch of the addition has since been reconfigured.

The main house was built on a 500-acre parcel for Jonathan Hasbrouck (1763-1846), a large landowner and Ulster County judge.

The house currently stands on an approximate one-acre parcel with a contributing timber-frame shed on the west side. Included within the NRHP nomination boundary of the site is a historically relevant barn complex (built circa 1875) that is located on the abutting property to the east, along with a non-contributing small-frame dwelling.

It was listed on the National Register of Historic Places in 2013.
