= Mount Versteeg =

Mountain in the American state of California

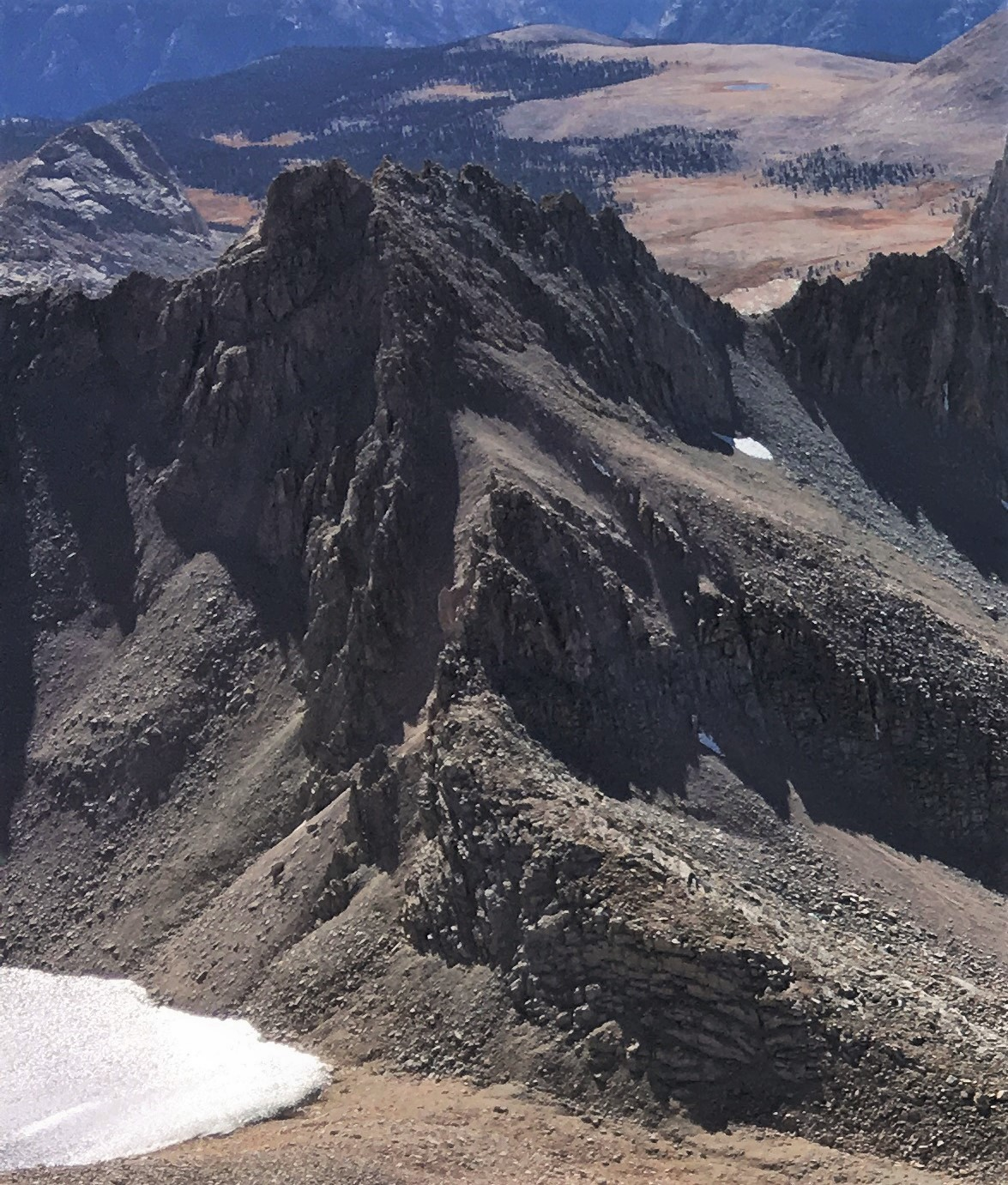
- Northeast aspect, from Mt. Williamson

Highest point
- Elevation: 13,471 ft (4,106 m)
- Prominence: 282 ft (86 m)
- Parent peak: Trojan Peak (13,947 ft)
- Isolation: 0.67 mi (1.08 km)
- Listing: Mountain peaks of California
- Coordinates: 36°38′52″N 118°19′32″W

Naming
- Etymology: Chester Versteeg

Geography
- Location within California Location within the United States
- Location: Sequoia National Park; Tulare County / Inyo County; California, U.S.
- Parent range: Sierra Nevada
- Topo map: USGS Mount Williamson

Geology
- Rock age: Cretaceous
- Mountain type: Fault block
- Rock type: granitic

Climbing
- Easiest route: class 3

Mount Versteeg is a 13,471-foot-elevation (4,106-meter) mountain summit located on the crest of the Sierra Nevada mountain range in California. It is situated on the common border of Tulare County with Inyo County, as well as the shared boundary of Sequoia National Park and John Muir Wilderness. It is 15 miles (24 km) west-northwest of the community of Lone Pine, one mile (1.6 km) southeast of Mount Tyndall, one mile (1.6 km) southwest of Mount Williamson, and 0.68 mile northwest of Trojan Peak, the nearest higher neighbor. Mt. Versteeg ranks as the 66th highest peak in California. Topographic relief is significant as it rises approximately 950 feet (290 meters) above Lake Helen of Troy in approximately 0.2 mile.

== Etymology ==
The peak's name was officially adopted by the United States Board on Geographic Names in 1964 in memory of Chester Versteeg (1887–1963), lawyer, author, and prominent Sierra Club member who devoted much of his life to furthering interest in the Sierra Nevada. He is credited with 40 first ascents in the Sierra Nevada, such as Mount Tinemaha, Mount Goode, and Colosseum Mountain. As the first chairman the Sierra Club's Committee on Geographic Names, he was responsible for the naming of 250 geographical features in the Sierra Nevada, including Trojan Peak and Lake Helen of Troy, which he named for his alma mater, University of Southern California. The club's Angeles Chapter annually presents a Chester Versteeg Outings Award which is "for long-term and outstanding leadership in furthering the enjoyment and safety of the outings program."

== Climate ==
According to the Köppen climate classification system, Mount Versteeg has an alpine climate. Most weather fronts originate in the Pacific Ocean, and travel east toward the Sierra Nevada mountains. As fronts approach, they are forced upward by the peaks, causing them to drop their moisture in the form of rain or snowfall onto the range (orographic lift). Precipitation runoff from this mountain drains west to the Kern River, and east to Owens Valley.
