= Bolton Brown =

American painter (1864–1936)

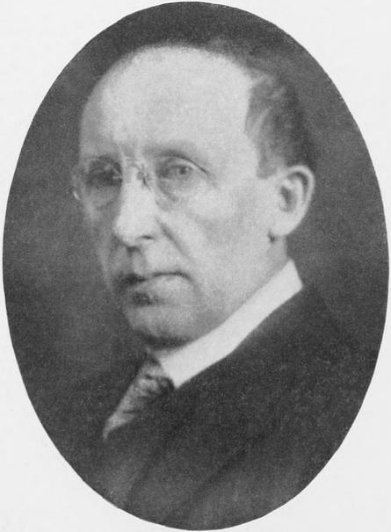
- Born: Bolton Coit Brown; November 27, 1864; Dresden, New York, US
- Died: September 15, 1936 (aged 71); Woodstock, New York, US
- Education: Syracuse University
- Occupations: Painter, lithographer, mountaineer

Bolton Coit Brown (November 27, 1864 – September 15, 1936) was an American painter, lithographer, and mountaineer. He was one of the original founders of the Byrdcliffe Colony in Woodstock, New York, part of what is now referred to as the Woodstock Art Colony.

Bolton Brown, Sketch of Mount King, 1896

== Before Woodstock: Stanford and the Sierras ==
Brown was born and raised in Dresden, in upstate New York. His sister was the scientific illustrator Anna B. Nash. After receiving his master's degree in painting from Syracuse University, he moved to California in 1891 to create the Art Department at Stanford University. Brown headed the department for almost ten years, but was dismissed in a dispute over his use of nude models in the classroom. Although his own art was heavily influenced by the Tonalist aesthetic, his methods of teaching, which contrasted sharply with the traditional approach at the nearby School of Design in San Francisco, stressed the Impressionist credo of rapid execution of "natural subjects" in the wilderness. Students often visited his studio-home for discussions on various environmental and political causes. In 1898 Brown designed the studio rooms in Stanford's new Art Building, which included such "radical" innovations as "one continuous belt of glass" eight feet high and muted terra cotta and gray tones on the walls. The walls were covered with reproductions and original works "by the avant-garde artists of Paris." One of his more successful students, the painter Jennie V. Cannon, published reviews of his exhibitions and several short biographies which described a quiet, serious and, compassionate teacher with steadfast principles.

Brown was an accomplished mountain climber and benefited from Stanford's proximity to the Sierra Nevada range, mostly famously explored by John Muir (1838–1914), founder of the Sierra Club, of which Brown was a charter member. Brown was the first to record climbing a group of peaks in the Sierras with, in two instances, his intrepid wife Lucy; his most challenging first ascent was of Mount Clarence King (also known as Mount King) in August 1896. According to the Climber's Guide to the High Sierra, Brown's ascent of Mount King was the first time advanced aid-climbing techniques were used in North America. Nearby Mount Bolton Brown (13,491 ft) is named after him; Brown also named several peaks in the area of Mount King.

Bolton Brown, Moonlight Bathers, 1915, lithograph

== Byrdcliffe ==
Brown's skills as an artist and outdoorsman brought him to the attention of Ralph Radcliffe Whitehead (1854–1929), an aristocratic utopian who developed the concept, and supplied the capital, for the Byrdcliffe Colony. Byrdcliffe was an artists' colony based on ideals and models provided by John Ruskin (1819–1900) and the English Arts and Crafts movement. Whitehead dispatched Brown on an expedition through the Catskills, scouting locations for three weeks. Brown convinced Whitehead that Woodstock, NY, in the heart of the Catskill Mountains, was where Byrdcliffe should be, although Whitehead had planned on a location further south. Along with fellow artistic spirit Hervey White, also hired by Whitehead, Brown developed and managed the grounds of Byrdcliffe from 1902 to 1903, constructing footpaths, plumbing systems and bungalows. But Brown and White were both, ultimately, unable to sustain working relationships with Whitehead. White left of his own accord; Brown, meanwhile, was fired. Although the initial disputes were over budgets and deadlines, Brown later cited his distrust of the "medieval" intentions Whitehead harbored for the colony.

== Painter-printmaker ==
Bolton Brown went on to create experimental landscape paintings, migrating between Woodstock and New York City and working within the style that came to be known as Tonalism. He exhibited one painting at the legendary 1913 Armory Show in New York but, despite skill and dedication, never succeeded as a painter. In 1915, an exhibition of the work of Albert Sterner in New York inspired him to turn to lithography, a print-making technique that would ultimately occupy his time and intellect to an almost obsessive degree. After a year of study in England under Francis Ernest Jackson, working devotedly with a press in his rented flat (to the point of grinding his own limestones when necessary), he returned to New York in 1916 and established his own press at 146 East 19th Street. There he earned his greatest fame, printing lithographs for John Sloan, Rockwell Kent, Arthur B. Davies, George William Eggers and well-known Woodstock artist George Bellows, whose premature death in 1925 was both a professional and emotional blow to Brown. In addition to printing these others' work, Brown created over 400 lithographs of his own, with a focus on nature and female nudes; lithographs such as Moonlight Bathers (1915), Cloudy Dawn, (1916) and Sifting Shadows (1916) represent Brown's ability to translate Tonalism from painting into a print medium. Each was printed with great care, signed, and charged for at dearer than average rates, as Bolton cultivated the status of master printer. He promoted the medium indefatigably, along the lines for artists laid out by Ruskin, praising the physical vigor it required and the exquisite control of tone and shading it allowed, but insisting, in the Arts and Crafts tradition, on printers working directly on the limestone during composition.

== Death ==
Brown died in 1936 in Woodstock, alone and impoverished but by no means unaccomplished. Thinking and working ceaselessly until the end, he left behind an enormous output of lithographs and writings, including books and articles on painting and lithography and 12 volumes of journals documenting his experiments in print-making. He is buried in the Woodstock Artists' Cemetery, on a simple birch pallet covered with pine branches under a boulder of his selection.
