= Ralph Radcliffe Whitehead =

English benefactor of the Byrdcliffe Arts and Crafts Colony (1854–1929)

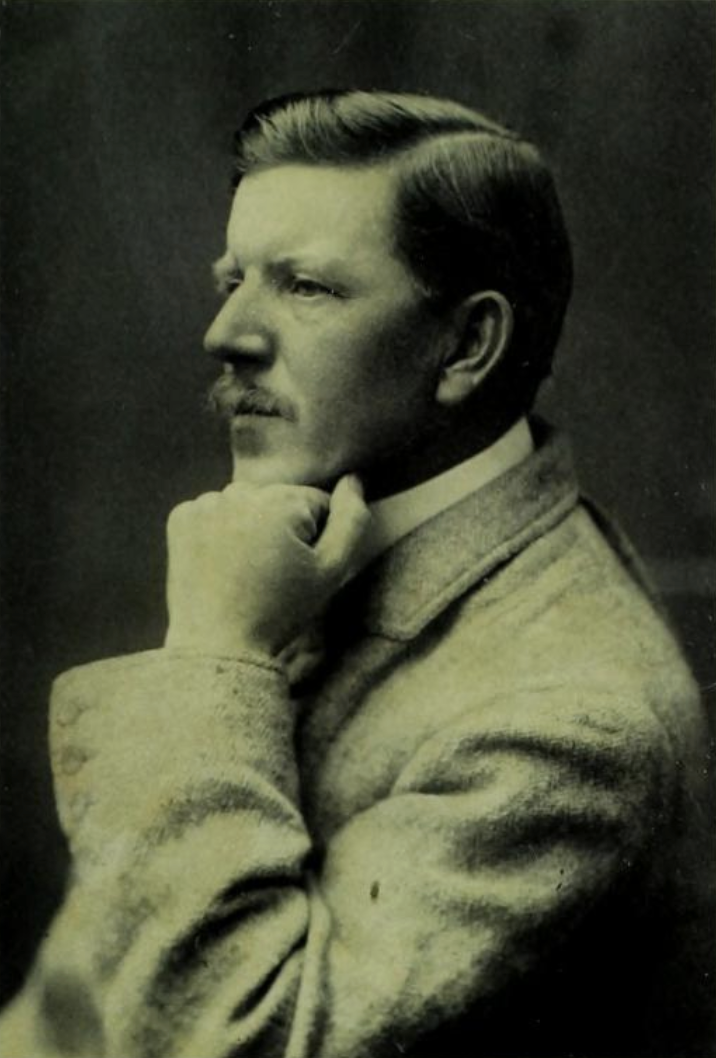
- Born: November 4, 1854; Saddleworth, Yorkshire, England
- Died: February 23, 1929 (aged 74); Woodstock, New York, US
- Education: Balliol College, Oxford (MA)
- Known for: Founder of Byrdcliffe Colony
- Spouse: Jane Byrd McCall Whitehead

Ralph Radcliffe Whitehead (November 4, 1854 – February 23, 1929) was an English philanthropist and the founder and chief benefactor of the Byrdcliffe Arts and Crafts Colony located in Woodstock, New York.

== Early life and influences ==
Whitehead was born in 1854 in Saddleworth, Yorkshire, England, to Francis Frederick and Isabella Dalglish Whitehead. His father was a wealthy textile mill owner and industrialist from whom he eventually received a large inheritance. Whitehead attended Harrow School and Balliol College, Oxford, receiving his Master of Arts degree in 1880. While at Oxford, he studied under John Ruskin, who inspired Whitehead's interest in forming a utopian society based on art, craftsmanship, and unity. His vision was further developed by his acquaintance with William Morris, a principal exponent of the Arts and Crafts movement. Little is known about Whitehead's activities in the 1880s, but at some point he married an Austrian woman, Marie.

== Move to America ==
In 1890, Whitehead met Jane Byrd McCall, a socialite and aspiring artist from Philadelphia, while she was touring Italy with her mother and sister. She had also studied under Ruskin at Oxford, where they had first met. They kept their courtship a secret until Whitehead could establish residency in Berlin in order to obtain a divorce under German law. In 1892, Whitehead visited the United States, where he married Jane McCall. The couple spent 1893 in Europe, where Jane studied painting at the Académie Julian. They then returned to America, settling in Montecito, California, and building a mansion on a 70-acre mountaintop estate called Arcady. Their sons, Ralph Jr. and Geoffrey Jocelyn (nicknamed Peter), were born in 1899 and 1901.

From the outset, Whitehead dreamed of establishing a community based on the Arts and Crafts movement. They explored potential locations in Oregon and North Carolina. With the aid of friends Hervey White and Bolton Coit Brown, he founded his colony at Woodstock in the bucolic Hudson Valley in 1902. During the first decade or so of the twentieth century, the community flourished and Woodstock became a destination for the arts for decades to come.

== Byrdcliffe colony ==
Byrdcliffe (a name coined from a combination of Ralph and Jane Whitehead's middle names) occupied 1,500 acres (6.1 km^{2}) in Woodstock and quickly became a haven for artists known and unknown—100 by 1905. Thirty buildings sprang up, including studios, barns, cottages, and a library, as well as the White Pines manor house where the Whitehead family lived. It stood as a "rural, utopian ideal based on the brotherhood of artistic collaboration" and focused on the "art of living through creative manual work." Notable residents and visitors included John Burroughs, John Dewey, Arnold Dolmetsch, Blanche Lazzell, Eva Watson-Schütze, Ellen Gates Starr, Charlotte Perkins Gilman, Owen Wister, Zulma Steele, and James T. Shotwell. Residents produced furniture, pottery, textiles, paintings, and photographs. Whitehead himself was particularly interested in furniture, pottery, and photography.

Byrdcliffe never became a self-sustaining community. Its failure is variously attributed to Whitehead's limited artistic ability, his struggles to establish a viable market for the community's artistic outputs, and resentment over Whitehead's aloofness and benevolent despotism. Residents began drifting away to smaller communities or their own homes. Hervey White broke with Whitehead in 1905 and started a popular rival artists' colony called the Maverick on a farm across town, while the Art Students League of New York established a summer school of painting in Woodstock in 1906.

== Later life and death ==
Whitehead died in 1929, heartbroken over the death of his son Ralph Jr. in a shipwreck a few months earlier. The colony persisted in limited form under his wife and younger son, who died in 1955 and 1975, respectively, and remains active today. The Byrdcliffe papers, including fifteen hundred letters exchanged between Ralph and Jane Whitehead beginning in the 1890s, are held at the Winterthur Library.

== Writings ==
Whitehead wrote essay collections entitled Grass of the Desert (Chiswick Press, 1892) and Arrows of the Dawn (1895) and edited Folk-Songs of Eastern Europe (Oliver Ditson, 1922), among other published works. His essay "Work" in Grass of the Desert first set forth his ideas for a utopian colony.
