= Byrdcliffe Colony =

- Byrdcliffe Historic District
- U.S. National Register of Historic Places
- U.S. Historic district
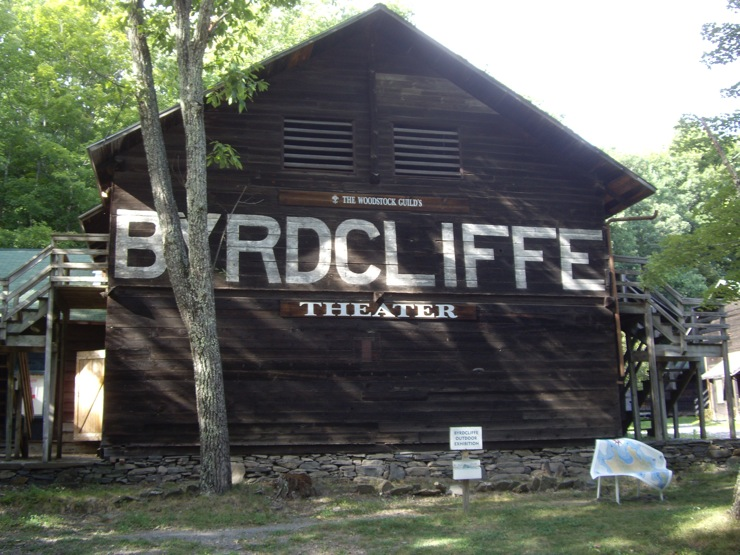

- Location within New York Location within the United States
- Location: Upper Byrdcliffe Way, Woodstock, Ulster County, New York
- Coordinates: 42°3′14″N 74°8′17″W
- Built: 1902
- Architect: Ralph Radcliffe Whitehead
- Architectural style: Stick/Eastlake
- NRHP reference No.: 79001643
- Added to NRHP: May 7, 1979

The Byrdcliffe Colony, also called the Byrdcliffe Arts Colony or Byrdcliffe Historic District, was founded in 1902 near Woodstock, New York by Jane Byrd McCall and Ralph Radcliffe Whitehead and colleagues, Bolton Brown (artist) and Hervey White (writer). It is the oldest operating arts and crafts colony in America. The Arts and Crafts movement arose in the late nineteenth century in reaction to the dehumanizing monotony and standardization of industrial production. Byrdcliffe was created as an experiment in utopian living inspired by the Arts and Crafts movement.

The colony is still in operation today and is located on 300 acres (1.2 km^{2}) with 35 original buildings, all designed in the Arts and Crafts style. There is a self-guided walking tour through the compound as well as a hiking path that leads to the mountain top which gives way to scenic Catskill views.

Along with ongoing music, theater and art performances held in the Byrdcliffe Theater, Barn and on property lawns, The Byrdcliffe Colony hosts an Artist-In-Residence program that houses over 70 artists each summer who practice in a wide variety of fields and media. The program accepts writers, composers, and visual artists. Byrdcliffe maintains an exhibition and performance space in the heart of Woodstock, the Kleinert/James Center for the Arts, which hosts 6 or 7 exhibitions of primarily contemporary art annually.

== Location ==
Woodstock is surrounded by the Catskill Mountains of New York State. The entire Byrdcliffe estate lay on 1,500 acres (6.1 km^{2}) on the south-facing side of Mount Guardian, just above Woodstock. This location provides the rustic landscape meant to inspire and elevate the art community. Additionally, Woodstock offers close proximity to the art and culture of New York City and was home to well-known painters like Milton Avery and Philip Guston.

== History ==
For many years, Whitehead held the idea of creating an Arts and Crafts community where all the arts would come together, including painting, sculpture, music, metalwork, and furniture making. After a failed attempt to establish a community near Santa Barbara, California and Albany, Oregon, he scouted the East Coast for a suitable site, sending painter and lithographer Bolton Brown on a three-week excursion through the Hudson Valley, where he would select Woodstock, New York, and begin construction. The Byrdcliffe Arts Colony received its name as a combination of Ralph Radcliffe Whitehead's middle name and his wife's, Jane Byrd McCall Whitehead, middle name.

Artists, writers, musicians, social reformers, and intellectuals came from across the country to stay at Byrdcliffe and gain inspiration from the setting and people with shared artistic goals. Facilities included studios for painting, weaving, pottery, metalwork, woodworking; cottages with bathrooms and sleeping porches; a library, and a rambling villa for Whitehead and his family. He built "White Pines" as his residence with a skylit cathedral ceilinged weaving room overlooking a picturesque view across the Woodstock Valley.

Writer Hervey White had been an early founder and worker at Byrdcliffe Colony and he was one of the first to leave and start a new, nearby colony independently. The Byrdcliffe Colony had been "well-financed and run somewhat autocratically" with a strong sense of designing and planning a legacy, while Maverick Artist Colony was more "scruffier, more truly communal and anarchic".

The artist colony of Byrdcliffe failed to fulfill its goals as a self-sufficient arts community. It became too expensive, and Ralph Whitehead's dominating personality became a confining force. Byrdcliffe survived for almost 30 years under Whitehead's vision until his death in 1929.

After Ralph Whitehead's death in 1929, his widow, Jane, and son Peter struggled to keep the colony alive. After Jane's death in 1955, Peter sold much of the land to pay taxes and maintenance on the heart of the colony which he kept intact. The Whiteheads intended to preserve Byrdcliffe "for the purpose of promoting among the residents of Woodstock...the study, practice and development of skill in the fine arts and crafts, as well as a true appreciation thereof..."

Although the arts and crafts utopian experiment soon ran out of steam, the continuing magic of Byrdcliffe enthralled many notable people including the educator John Dewey, author Thomas Mann and naturalist John Burroughs. Isadora Duncan danced at White Pines; Bob Dylan lived in a house at Byrdcliffe in the '60s and early '70s; Joanne Woodward was involved in the River Arts Repertory at the Byrdcliffe Theatre.

== Artist in Residence program ==
The Artist in Residence program has operated at Byrdcliffe for approximately 20 years and now hosts over 75 artists throughout four summer sessions. Artists live either in two large communal buildings, or in independent cottages, fostering a creative community as originally intended by the founders. There are numerous large work spaces and studios in multiple buildings on the property. The program sees an especially large influx of practicing visual artists, as well as published writers, college professors and professional composers, looking for retreat time to concentrate on their work. Facilities open for use by Byrdcliffe artists are a ceramics studio, jewelry making studio, darkroom, and large performance spaces such as the Byrdcliffe Theater and the Barn. Composers work in a small studio with a 1905 Steinway upright piano.

== Merger with Woodstock Guild of Craftsmen ==
Upon Peter Whitehead's death in 1975, Byrdcliffe was left to the Woodstock Guild of Craftsmen which has continued to maintain and administer programs at the colony. In 1979, the Byrdcliffe Historic District was listed on the National Register of Historic Places in recognition of its historical and architectural significance. Byrdcliffe's cottages have been rented since 1984 only to working artists, maintaining sympathy with the founder's creative vision.

== Woodstock Byrdcliffe Guild ==
Byrdcliffe is now owned by the Woodstock Byrdcliffe Guild (WBG), a non-profit multi-arts organization with over 600 members. WBG's Kleinert/James Center for the Arts hosts local and national performing, visual, and literary artists. The WBG offers a variety of classes in the arts.

== See also ==
- Art colony
- Artist in Residence
- Arts and crafts
- Greenwich Village
- History of art
- Provincetown, Massachusetts
- Taos, New Mexico
- Utopia
- Woodstock, New York
