= Everlast Metal Products Corporation =

American aluminum giftware manufacturer (1932–1961)

- Formerly: Western Silver Works, Inc.; Western Silver Novelty Company
- Type: Private
- Industry: Housewares; Giftware
- Founded: 1932 in New York City, U.S.
- Founders: Louis Schnitzer; Nathan Gelfman
- Defunct: 1961
- Fate: Dissolved
- Headquarters: New York City, United States
- Key people: Jack Orenstein (national sales manager)
- Products: Hand forged (hammered) aluminum giftware and housewares

Everlast Metal Products Corporation was an American manufacturer of hand forged (hammered) aluminum giftware and housewares that operated in New York City from 1932 to 1961. According to The Henry Ford museum, it was "one of the most prolific manufacturers of aluminum giftware" in the United States during the mid-20th century.

== History ==
=== Founders and predecessor businesses ===
Everlast was founded by the brothers-in-law Louis Schnitzer and Nathan Gelfman, metalworkers who emigrated from Kiev then part of the Russian Empire and now in Ukraine to the United States in the 1910s. In the early 1920s the two established a silver housewares business in New York City called Western Silver Works, Inc., where they polished and plated silver; by about 1930 they were producing silver and chrome plated items under the name Western Silver Novelty Company.

During the Great Depression, demand for silver housewares fell, and the partners turned to the cheaper metal aluminum. In 1932 they formed the Everlast Metal Products Corporation and began producing hand forged aluminum giftware.

=== Growth ===
Everlast introduced its first product line, "Forged Giftware," in 1933; featuring Colonial Revival and Neoclassical Revival inspired motifs, it continued until the company closed. Around 1935 Jack Orenstein was hired as national sales manager; he organized a national sales force that gave Everlast a leading position in the decorative aluminum giftware market.

After the United States entered World War II, aluminum production for consumer goods was halted, and Everlast secured government contracts, producing military equipment under the name Browning Precision Tool Co. After the war the company returned to consumer production and, in 1946, opened a showroom in Chicago to reach Midwestern buyers. Its most successful line, "Bali Bamboo," reflected postwar American interest in the South Pacific; according to The Henry Ford, "more than 60 different items, produced between 1946 and 1959, featured raised bamboo shoots and a satin finish."

=== Decline and closure ===
The company struggled through the 1950s. In 1951 the Korean War again restricted aluminum for consumer goods, and Orenstein soon left the company to work in ceramics and plastics. Everlast introduced a highly polished "Silvercrest" line in 1952 and a contemporary "Everlast Modern" line in 1953, but decorative aluminum was increasingly regarded as old fashioned amid the rise of colorful plastics. After nearly thirty years in business, Schnitzer and Gelfman closed Everlast in 1961.

== Products and marks ==
Everlast's aluminum giftware was stamped "Hand Forged Everlast Metal" together with a maker's mark showing an anchor and an arm holding a hammer, usually with a pattern number below. The company used numerous marks and produced a wide range of decorative motifs, which are catalogued in standard collectors' reference books on hand wrought aluminum. Products included trays, bowls, pitchers, ice buckets, coasters, candle holders, silent butlers, cocktail shakers, and folding serving carts. Beyond forged aluminum, collectors' literature reports that the company produced additional lines, including color anodized aluminum ("Neocraft"), hand forged copper ("Plymouth Ware"), and an inexpensive "Harmony House" line for Sears.

== Designer collaborations ==
Everlast is associated with the industrial designers Russel Wright and Mary Wright in the early 1940s. Dealers and auction records attribute a folding aluminum serving cart and butler tray bearing a "Fallen Leaves" foliate motif to a design by Mary Wright, made by Everlast around 1940; such pieces are said to have been shown at the Metropolitan Museum of Art's 1940 exhibition of contemporary American industrial art.

== Collecting and legacy ==
Everlast pieces are among the most frequently encountered mid-20th-century American hammered aluminum collectibles and are documented in collectors' guides by Dannie A. Woodard and Everett Grist. The Henry Ford in Dearborn, Michigan, holds a collection of Everlast objects and period advertisements, several of which are available through its digital collections. The company's history, production methods, marketing, marks, and motifs were documented in a 2006 research report by Kira Macyda.
