= Mary Wright (designer) =

American designer and author (1904–1952)

- Wright in the 1940s
- Born: Mary Small Einstein; December 13, 1904; New York City, US
- Died: September 15, 1952 (aged 47); New York City, US
- Education: Ethical Culture School; Cornell University
- Occupations: Designer; author
- Known for: Industrial and product design; marketing
- Notable work: Wright Accessories; American Modern
- Style: American modernism
- Spouse: Russel Wright (m. 1927)
- Children: 1

Mary Small Einstein Wright (December 13, 1904 – September 15, 1952) was an American designer, sculptor, author and businesswoman who worked to "shape modern American lifestyle".

Wright and her husband Russel Wright co-founded the design business Wright Accessories Inc., where she served as vice-president, factory supervisor and oversaw publicity, marketing, and promotion. She was a founder of America Designs Inc., an organization that supported the works of American industrial designers. Wright co-authored the best-selling book Guide to Easier Living that proposed lifestyle choices were analogous to "engineering problems with scientific solutions".

== Early life ==
Wright was born in Manhattan to a well-to-do family who owned textile mills. Her father was Milton I.D. Einstein who served as chairman of the board of Patchogue Plymouth Mills, a lace mill on Long Island. Her mother was Alma Stix Einstein. She was a relative of Albert Einstein.

Wright studied sculpture with the avant-garde artist Alexander Archipenko. She attended the Ethical Culture School in Manhattan and later attended Cornell University.

== Career ==
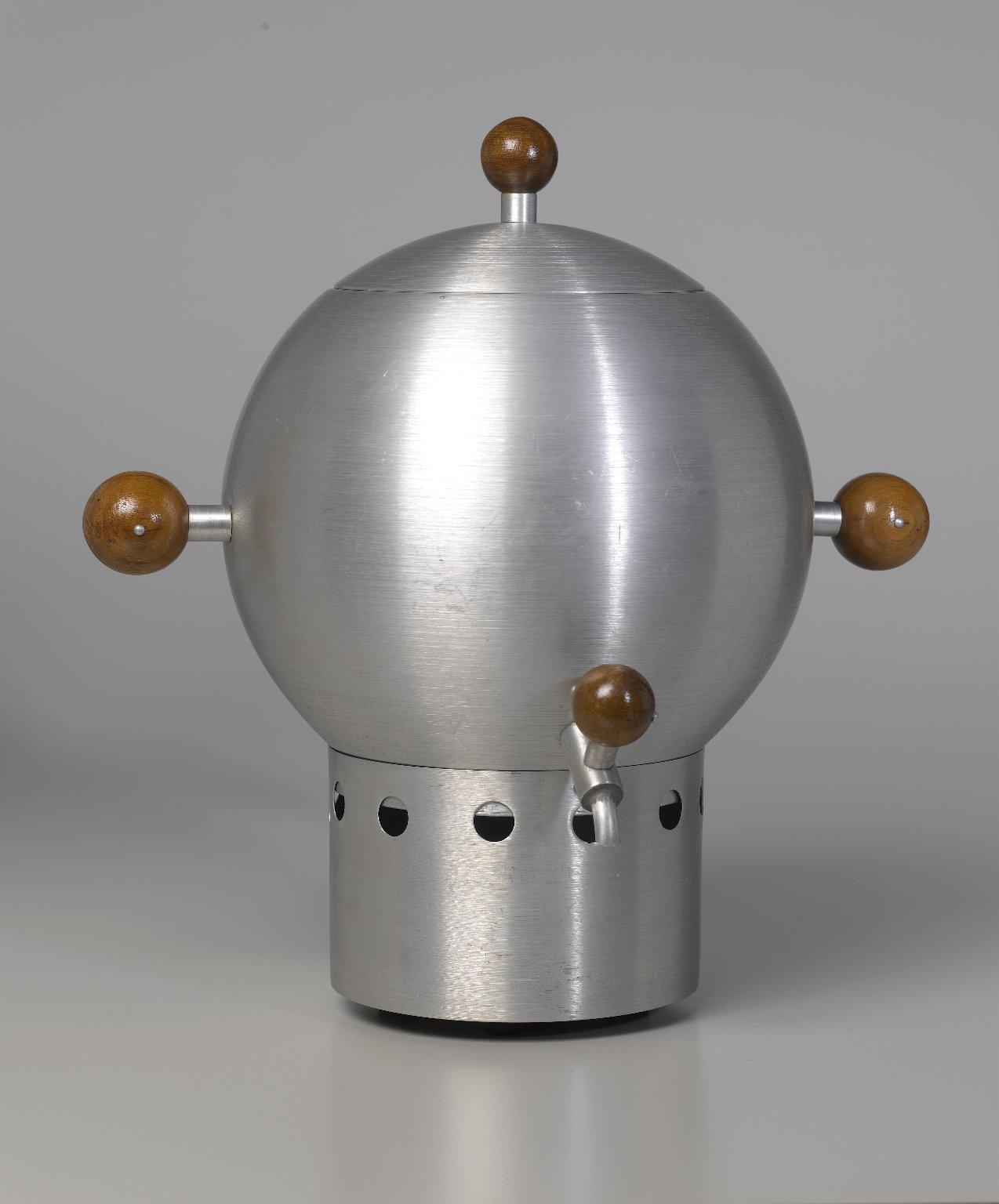
Wright Accessories Spun Aluminum Coffee Urn with wood details, ca. 1935

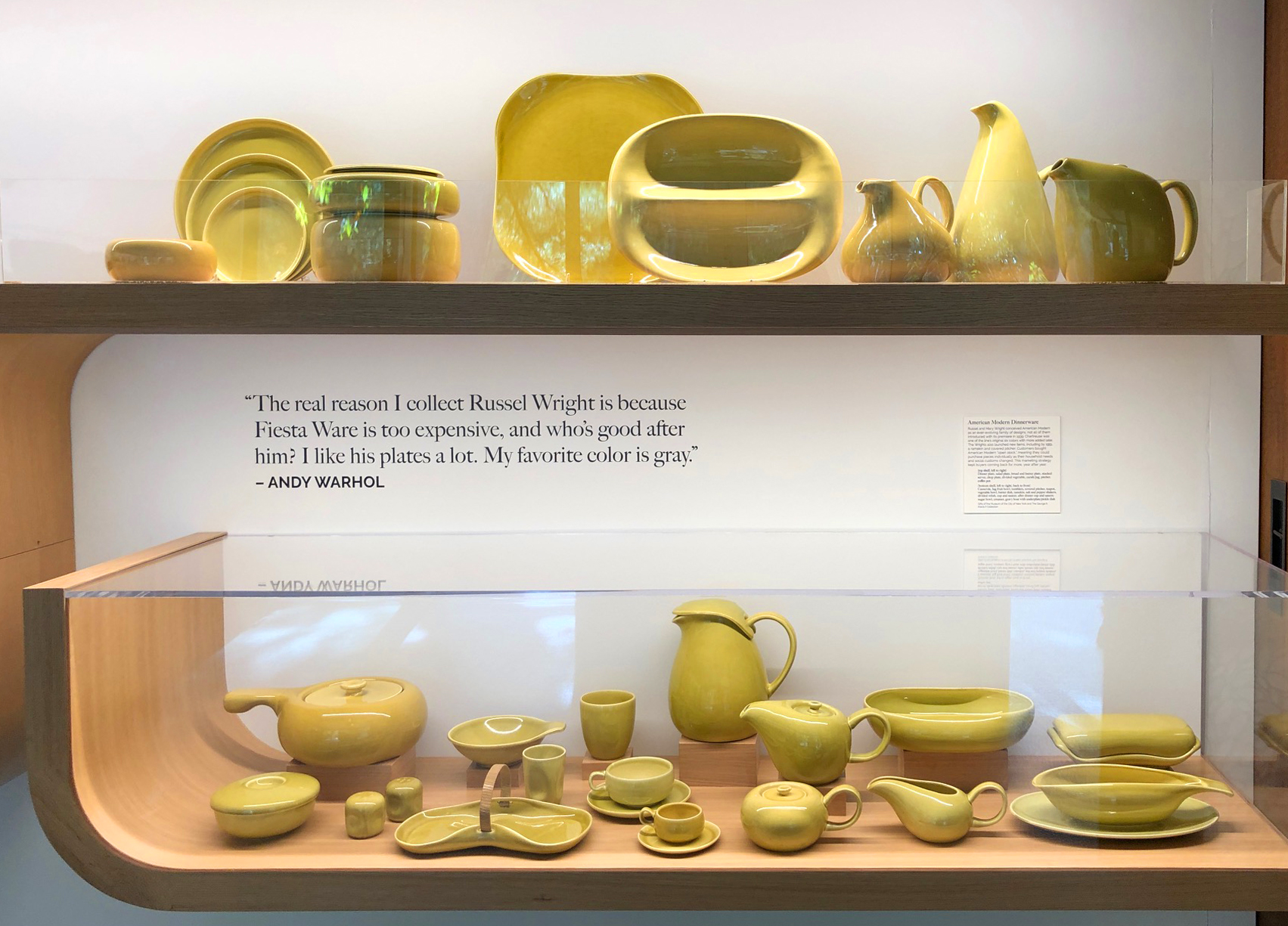
Wright American Modern pottery

In 1929, Wright and her husband co-founded the design business Wright Accessories Inc. where she served as vice-president, factory supervisor and oversaw publicity and promotion. The Wrights opened a studio in a former stable on East 35th Street in New York City. The company produced informal serving accessories made of spun aluminum, wood and other materials. The Spun Aluminum line was produced in the 35th Street studio that Wright organized, converting it into small-scale metal factory. She created a sales program with hand-rendered advertisements for which she wrote the copy. The firm also produced small cast-metal animals. According to the Smithsonian book, Russel Wright: Creating American Lifestyle, Wright encouraged her husband Russel to establish himself in the industrial design field.

In 1935, she coined the term "blond" to describe the light-colored maple wood that was used in Wright furniture and accessories.

In 1936, the Wrights partnered with Irving Richards; the three founded Raymor Company, of which Mary Wright was a part-owner. She and Richards wrote a "set of textbook principles" for marketing and advertising. The company was formerly called, Russel Wright Accessories, and sold modernist-styled housewares featuring designs by several designers including the Wrights.

The American Modern line was the Wrights' most successful product line of dishware designed for everyday use. American Modern was first produced in 1939, and by 1959 approximately 200 million pieces had been sold. The Wrights' "intuitive, humanist design and marketing savvy built a lifestyle empire that modernized the American home, popularizing ideas of open-plan layouts and outdoor living."

Wright collaborated with her husband to design modern tableware. She ran the business and was responsible for marketing their products including furniture and dinnerware. She also created "stage sets" in department stores to display their homeware designs as essential components of a distinctly American informal lifestyle.

Wright was a founder of America Designs Inc. and also served as secretary. The organization supported the works of American industrial designers. In 1940, with the guidance of Eleanor Roosevelt, the Wrights launched an ambitious marketing program, American Way, at Macy's department store in New York. The American Way agenda promoted the work of designers and artisans with the goal to mass-produce and nationally market original design work by Americans.

=== Country Gardens ===
In 1946, Wright created her own ensemble of dinnerware inspired by Asian design named Country Gardens for the Bauer Pottery Company in Atlanta and Los Angeles. Country Gardens was made in earthenware, glazed in mottled green, pink, brown, beige and white and exhibited at the Museum of Modern Art. She developed her own glazes with the assistance of Doris Coutant. Bauer used machine-made glazes and had difficulty reproducing the glazes to the specifications of Wright and Coutant.

=== Guide to Easier Living ===
Guide to Easier Living

Wright co-authored the best-selling book Guide to Easier Living (1950) with Russel Wright. The book, sometimes called their manifesto, describes ways to increase leisure time and reduce housework through efficient design and time management. The main thesis of the book was that "formality is not necessary for beauty."

In the chapter, The Housewife-Engineer, the authors encouraged their readers to analyze and perform time-and-motion studies involved in ordinary household tasks such as making beds, peeling potatoes and housecleaning. They wrote that the home is a "small industry, and every housewife its production engineer." Guide to Easier Living proposed that lifestyle choices were analogous to "engineering problems with scientific solutions". It included a chart illustrating 32 steps involved in "scientific bedmaking".

The book suggested modern ways of living for middle-class families, such as open plan living and easy entertaining. The Wrights offered ways to spend less time on labor-intensive chores such as cooking and cleaning, leaving more leisure time to spend together. Mary Wright's ideas in the highly illustrated how-to guide paralleled the mid-century post-war shift from urban to suburban living.

== Personal life ==
Wright married the American industrial designer Russel Wright in 1927, in Woodstock, New York, where they were both involved in the Maverick Festival and artist colony, Russel in designing and directing, and Mary was studying sculpture. The couple lived in a triplex penthouse on Park Avenue, and divided their time between their Manhattan home and an 80-acre estate, Dragon Rock at Manitoga, in Garrison, New York. The Wrights purchased the Manitoga property in 1942.

Mary and Russel Wright adopted a daughter named Annie. Mary Wright died of cancer in 1952 at the age of 47, at the Wright's townhome 221 East 48th Street, New York. Her daughter Annie, who was 2 years old at the time of Wright's death, was raised by her father.

== Legacy ==
In 2021 the Russel and Mary Wright Design Gallery was established at Manitoga in upstate New York. The gallery shows how the "Wrights shaped modern American lifestyle".

== See also ==
- Eva Zeisel
