= Hamilton-Skotch Corporation =

- Company type: Privately held company
- Industry: Manufacturing
- Founded: 1919
- Headquarters: Hamilton, Ohio, United States
- Key people: Louis Piker, Phillip Piker, J. Schlichter, Petra Cabot
- Products: Metal boxes (tool boxes, tackle boxes, filing boxes, etc.), Skotch Kooler coolers, kitchen tools
- Website: skotchkoolerusa.com

The Hamilton-Skotch Corporation was an American manufacturing company originally headquartered in Hamilton, Ohio. The company popularized the Skotch Kooler brand of plaid decorated coolers in the 1950s.

The company ceased production in 1970s, but in 2017 the Skotch trademarks were purchased and modern versions of the iconic midcentury branded products were produced.

== History ==
Hamilton-Skotch was founded as the Hamilton Metal Products Company in 1919 in Hamilton, Ohio. It was formed by Louis Piker, J. Schlichter and Phillip Piker when they raised $30,000 in capital and merged their businesses, the Hamilton Sheet Metal Company and the Schlichter Manufacturing Company. Hamilton Sheet Metal produced mailboxes and other sheet metal-based goods, while Schlichter Manufacturing was primary known for their Climax brand food graters.

After the merger, use of the Climax brand name expanded to their sheet metal products, like tackle boxes and filing boxes. By the 1950s they were also selling metal signage and plaques.

=== Skotch Koolers ===
Their most famous product was the Skotch Kooler. The design originated from a minnow bucket, a bucket used by fishermen to store living fish they had caught. The company was in debt, needed to expand its product line, and a minnow bucket seemed like a sensible choice, as they were already an established maker of tackle boxes. The product failed to sell well, due to existing competition, so the bucket was used as a basis for a cooler instead. While the product was an excellent cooler, its unique bucket shape was unfamiliar to consumers used to seeing rectangular coolers, and the original styling was nothing special.

In 1951 the company hired Petra Cabot to restyle the cooler. The new design featured a distinctive red, black, and yellow plaid decoration, leather accents, and Cobat's signature around the edge. Its fashionable design and solid cooling ability made it desirable, but its original price of $49.95 ($455 adjusted for inflation to 2016 dollars) limited sales. The design was simplified soon after and it was repriced at $7.95. At that price, sales more than doubled. It became so recognizable that the company eventually rebranded itself the Hamilton-Skotch Corporation and began using the Skotch name on many of its other products.

=== Fate ===
The Hamilton-Skotch Corporation failed to weather the industrial transition that swept the United States in the mid-20th century. By 1970 it had closed its Hamilton plant and moved what remained of its production to its existing facility in Ottawa, Kansas. By the late 70s its trademarks had lapsed and all of its products had disappeared from the market.

In 2017, with the goal of resurrecting the iconic midcentury brand, the Skotch trademarks were purchased by a trio from Minneapolis, Minnesota. The company was renamed to Skotch Kooler USA and the products were redesigned for a modern lifestyle while retaining their original charm and artisanal construction. The brand relaunched in 2020 with new-and-improved versions of the Skotch Soft Kooler and Skotch Grill.
