= Alexander Platt =

American conductor (born 1965)

- Born: April 7, 1965 (age 60); New York, New York
- Genres: Classical, Opera
- Occupations: Conductor, Music Director
- Website: alexanderplatt.com

Alexander Platt (born April 7, 1965) is an American symphony orchestra conductor and music director. He is currently the music director for Maverick Concerts, the Wisconsin Philharmonic, and the Waukegan and La Crosse Symphony Orchestras.

== Early life and education ==
Born in New York City in 1965, Platt was raised in Westport, Connecticut. He currently resides in Chicago and New York. As a child, Platt originally learned to play the viola. He first began conducting while in high school. His brother, Russell Platt, also conducts and composes.

Platt graduated from Berkeley College at Yale University in 1988 with a Bachelor of Arts degree. As a British Marshall Scholar at King’s College, Cambridge, he was awarded a MPhil in musicology in 1989 and completed PhD research. Platt was a conducting fellow at both the Aspen Music School and Festival and the Tanglewood Music Center. He also had apprentice conductor assignments with the Minnesota Orchestra, the Saint Paul Chamber Orchestra and the Minnesota Opera.

== Professional career ==
Alexander Platt has conducted or guest-conducted a number of ensembles over the course of his career in the United States, the United Kingdom, Denmark, Germany and Canada. In 2007, he conducted the Naumburg Orchestral Concerts, in the Naumburg Bandshell, Central Park, in the summer series.

Since 2015 he has been the curator of concerts at the Museum of Contemporary Art Westport.

He has served as the music director of the following:

- Plymouth Chorale and Chamber Orchestra, Milwaukee (1995–1999)
- Racine Symphony Orchestra (1993–2005)
- Marion (Indiana) Philharmonic (1996–2017)
- The Wisconsin Philharmonic (1997–present)
- The Maverick Concerts (2002–present)
- Greater Grand Forks Symphony Orchestra (2010–2015)
- La Crosse Symphony Orchestra (2010–present)
- Waukegan Symphony Orchestra (2019–present)
