= Greater Grand Forks Symphony Orchestra =

The Greater Grand Forks Symphony Orchestra (GGFSO) is a community orchestra based in Grand Forks, North Dakota that began operation in 1908. One of eighteen American orchestras to have surpassed their centennial year, the symphony employs local and regional musicians in performances of classical and modern symphonic music.

Fourteen conductors have held the post of music director during the life of the symphony:

- George Stout - 1908-1910
- William Wellington Norton - 1911–1918
- E.H. Wilcox 1918
- Fred Biedelman
- Knute Fraysaa thru 1930
- John E. Howard - 1930–1933
- Leo M. Haesle - 1933–1965
- Bill Pond - 1965–1966
- Thomas Facey - 1966-1971
- Jack Miller - 1971-1983
- John Deal - 1983 - 1994
- Timm Rolek - 1995-2005
- James Hannon - 2006-2009
- Alexander Platt - 2010 – 2014
- Alejandro Drago - 2014–present

Famed composers brought their batons to Grand Forks: Ernst von Dohnanyi conducted in 1955 and Gunther Schuller in 1978. Yehudi Menuhin, the most notable soloist to appear in the symphony's history, performed in 1962.

Recent events with the symphony have included a two-year residency from 2003 to 2005 by the Chiara String Quartet; participation in 2009 with a consortium of American orchestras presenting the premiere of Joseph Schwantner's Chasing Light, made possible through a grant from Ford Motor Company; celebrating the 100th anniversary season (one of 18 American orchestras to achieve that milepost) with a season-opening Beethoven 9 under the baton of Music Director James Hannon; presenting the North American premiere of the "Temporal Variations for Oboe and Strings" by Benjamin Britten, featuring Philip McKenzie as soloist, conducted by music director Alexander Platt; and another North American premiere of Britten, "Movements of a Clarinet Concerto", written for Benny Goodman but not completed by the composer. That performance on October 1, 2011, was by the orchestra's principal clarinetist, Douglas Monroe, conducted by Platt.

The orchestra maintains close ties with arts patrons, the business community, local educators, and the University of North Dakota for its supporters, its audience, and its musicians.
