= Manitoga =

Historic house in New York, United States

- Manitoga (Russel Wright Home)
- U.S. National Register of Historic Places
- U.S. National Historic Landmark
- New York State Register of Historic Places
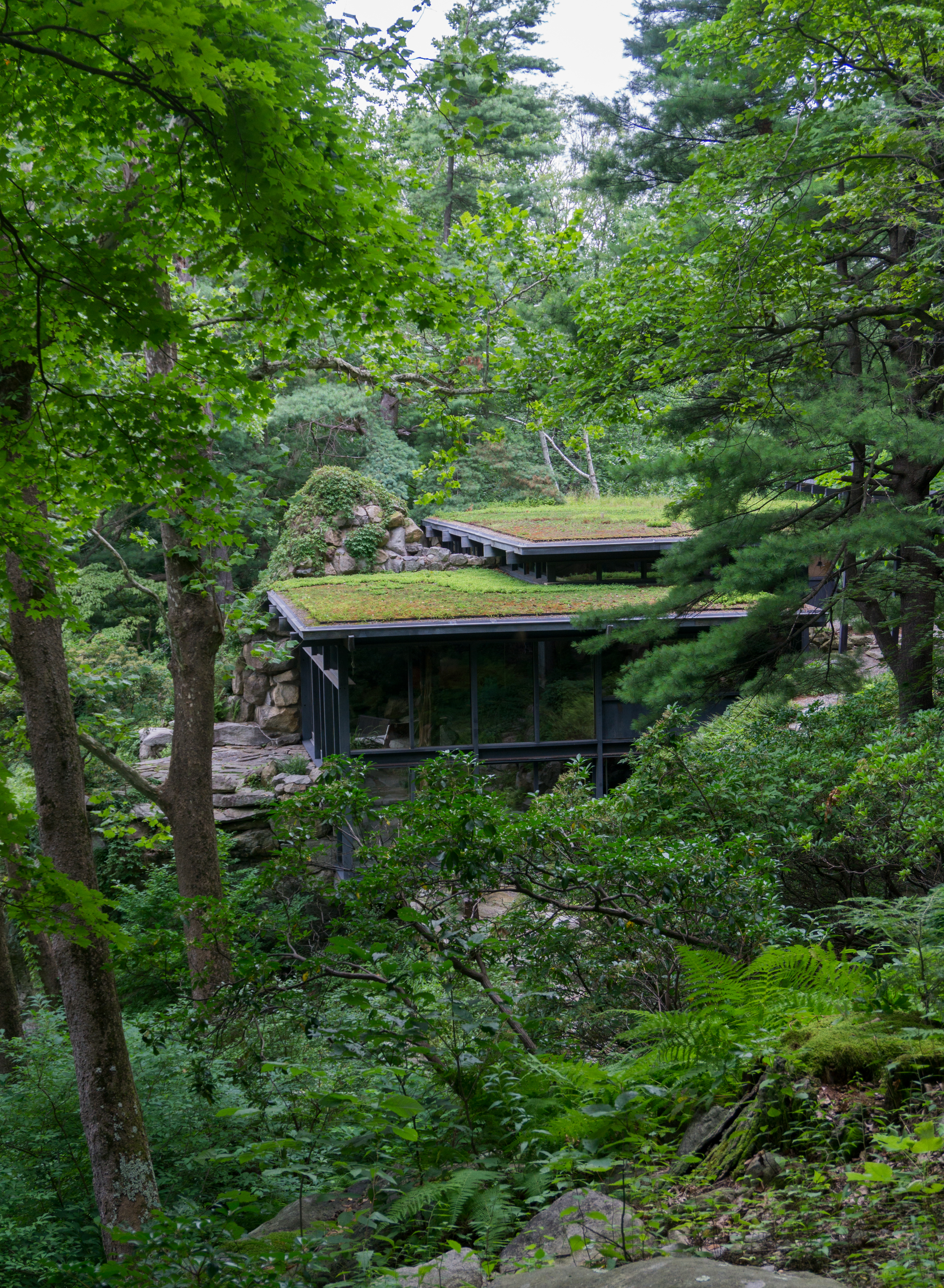
- Dragon Rock at Manitoga, 2018
- Location: Garrison, New York
- Nearest city: Peekskill, New York
- Coordinates: 41°20′55″N 73°57′04″W
- Area: 75 acres (30 ha)
- Built: 1941-1961
- Architect: Russel and Mary Wright; David L. Leavitt
- Architectural style: Modernist
- NRHP reference No.: 96001269
- NYSRHP No.: 07904.000123

Significant dates
- Added to NRHP: 1996
- Designated NHL: 2006
- Designated NYSRHP: August 29, 1996

Manitoga was the estate and modernist home of industrial designer Russel Wright (1904–1976) and his wife Mary Small Einstein Wright. It is located along New York State Route 9D south of Garrison, New York, a short distance north of the Bear Mountain Bridge.

Wright named his synthesis of architecture and nature "Manitoga", after Algonquin words meaning "place of great spirit". Built between 1941 and 1961, the home, studio, and surrounding woodland garden are collectively known as Dragon Rock. They were designed to convey Wright's ideas about living in harmony with nature.

The property was listed on the National Register of Historic Places in 1996. In 2006 the Department of the Interior designated it a National Historic Landmark, the only one to date in Putnam County. Manitoga is a member of the National Trust's Historic Artists' Homes and Studios program and a 2012 World Monuments Watch Site.

== History ==
Wright and his wife Mary Small Einstein Wright acquired the property in 1942. The 75 acres (30 ha) had been devastated by previous logging and quarrying, common in the Hudson Highlands in the early 20th century. The couple designed the property with sustainability in mind, a concept not widely applied at the time. In his reclamation efforts, Wright redirected a mountain stream and designed a 30-foot (9.1 m) multi-level waterfall to transform an abandoned quarry pit into a swimming pond. In addition to trees, streams, boulders, moss and native plants, his woodland landscape design incorporated stone steps, terraces and bridges.

Following Mary's death in 1952, Wright built his experimental home and studio directly into the rock ledge of the quarry. In an effort to blend in with Nature, the structures have green roofs, built-in elements and expansive walls of glass, offering dramatic views of the waterfall and surrounding landscape.

== Access ==
Manitoga includes 4 miles (6.4 km) of walking trails that Wright designed, with numerous plantings. The trails connect with the Appalachian Trail alongside the neighboring ridge of Canada Hill in Hudson Highlands State Park via the Osborne Loop. The outer trails are open to the public daily until sunset.

== Gallery ==
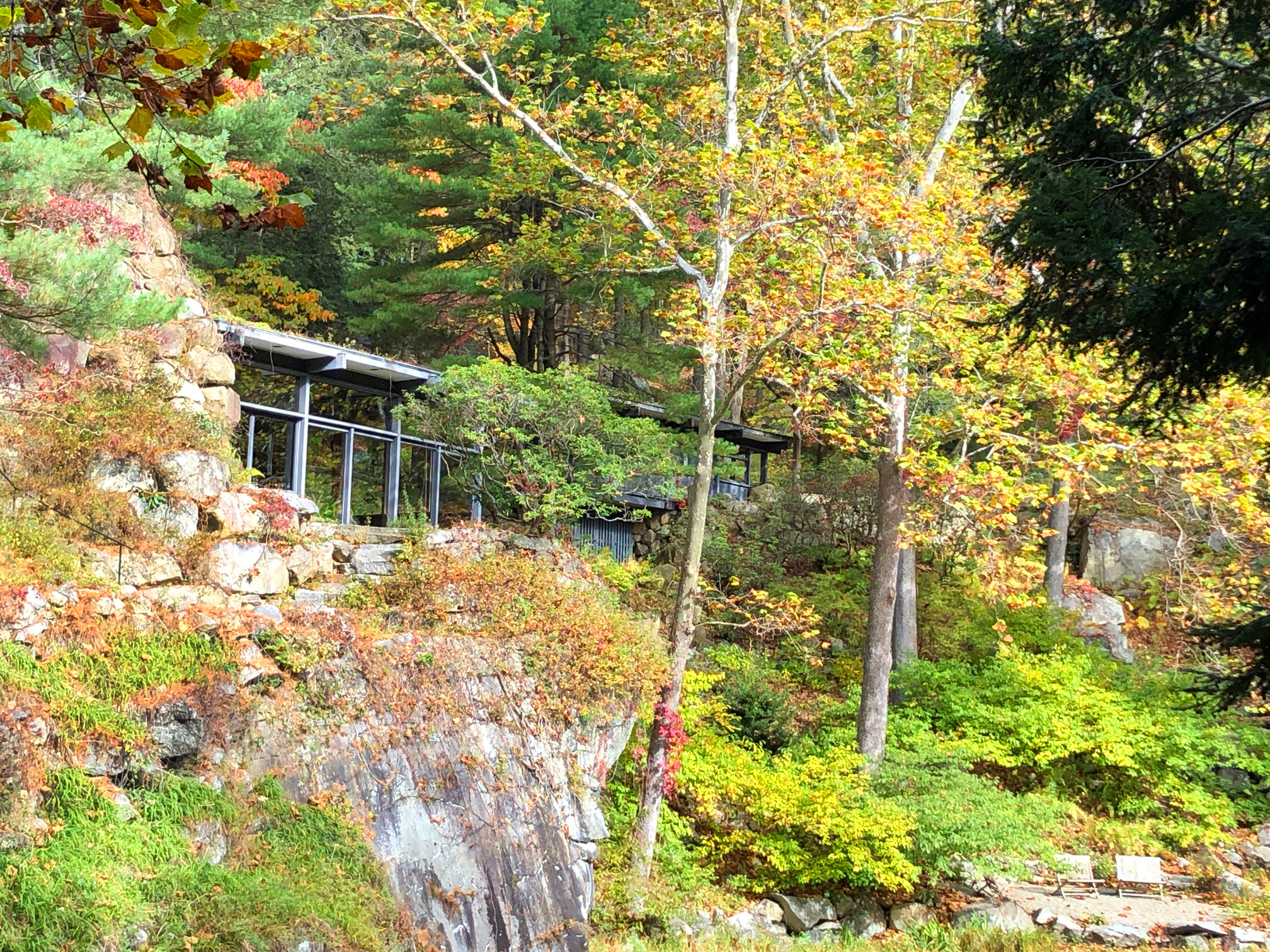
Dragon Rock studio overlooking the quarry pond

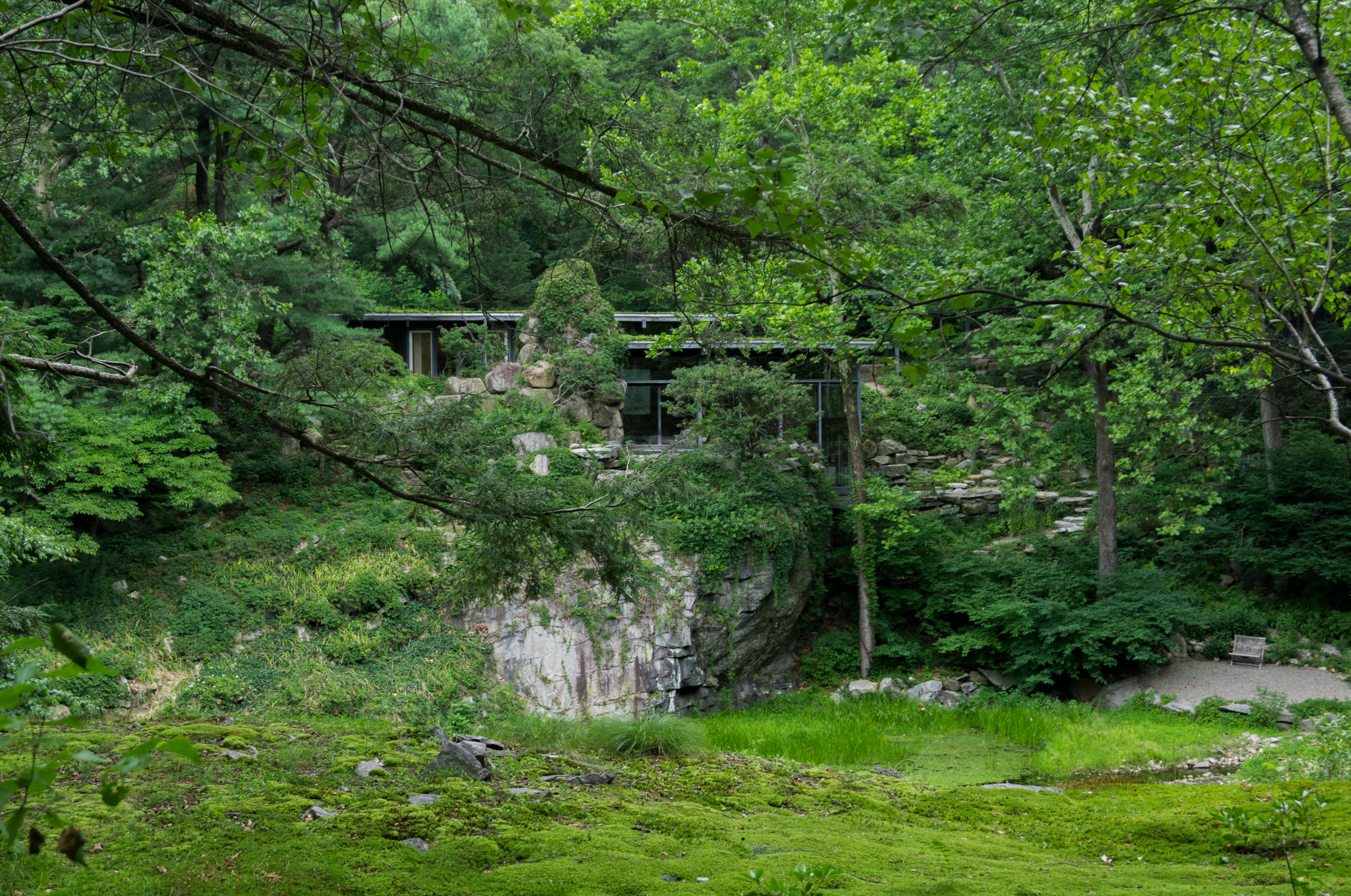
The house

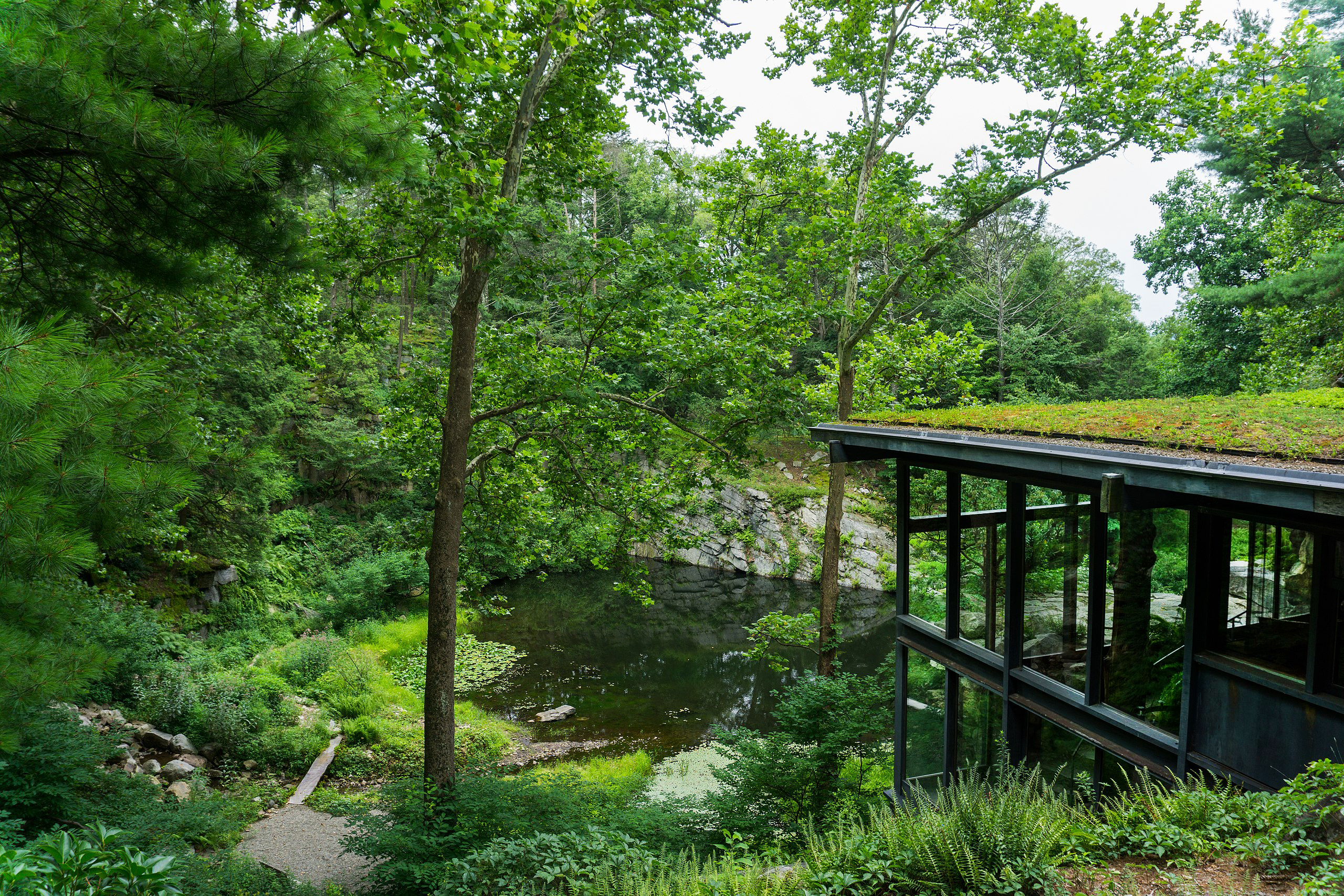
The pond

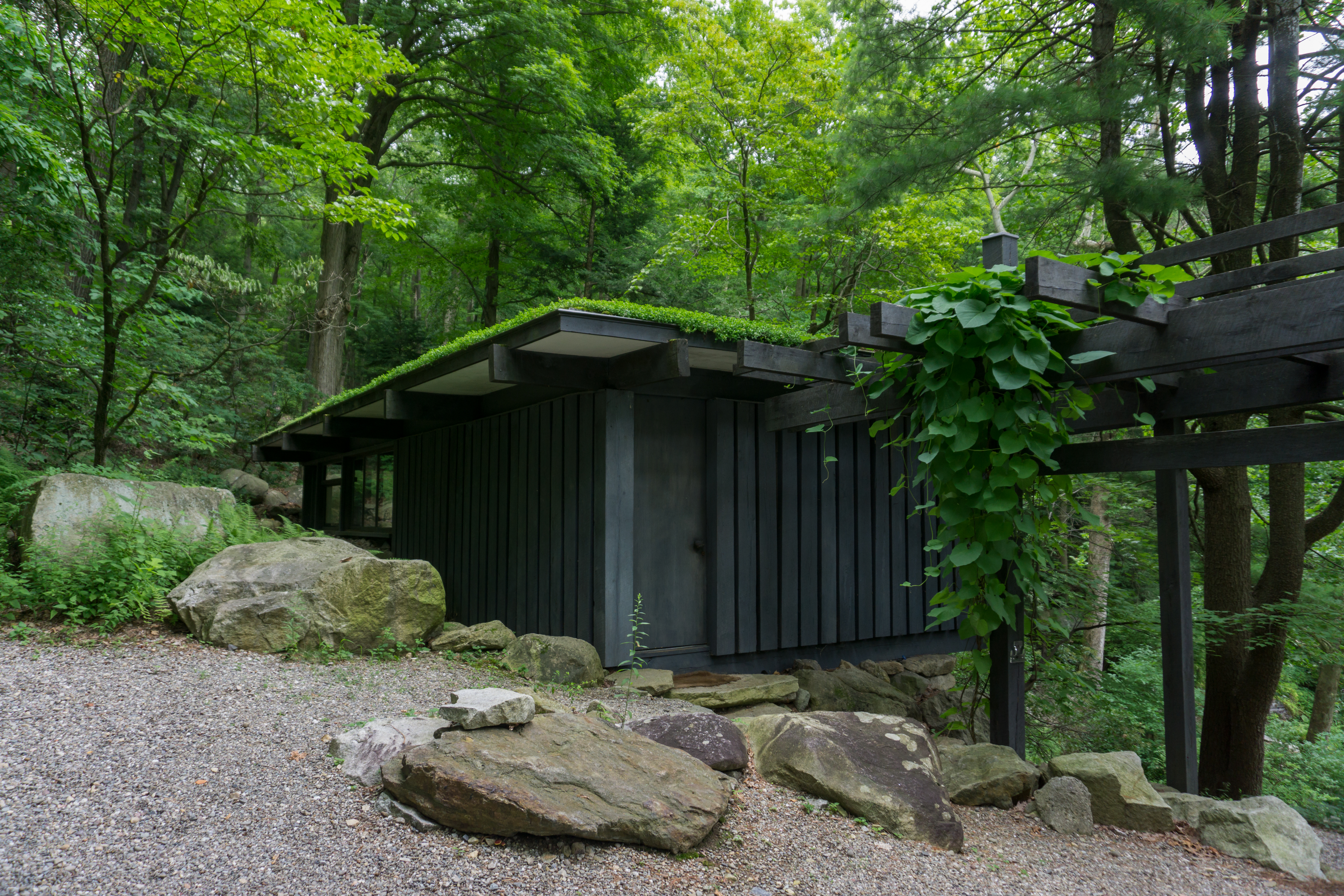
The studio

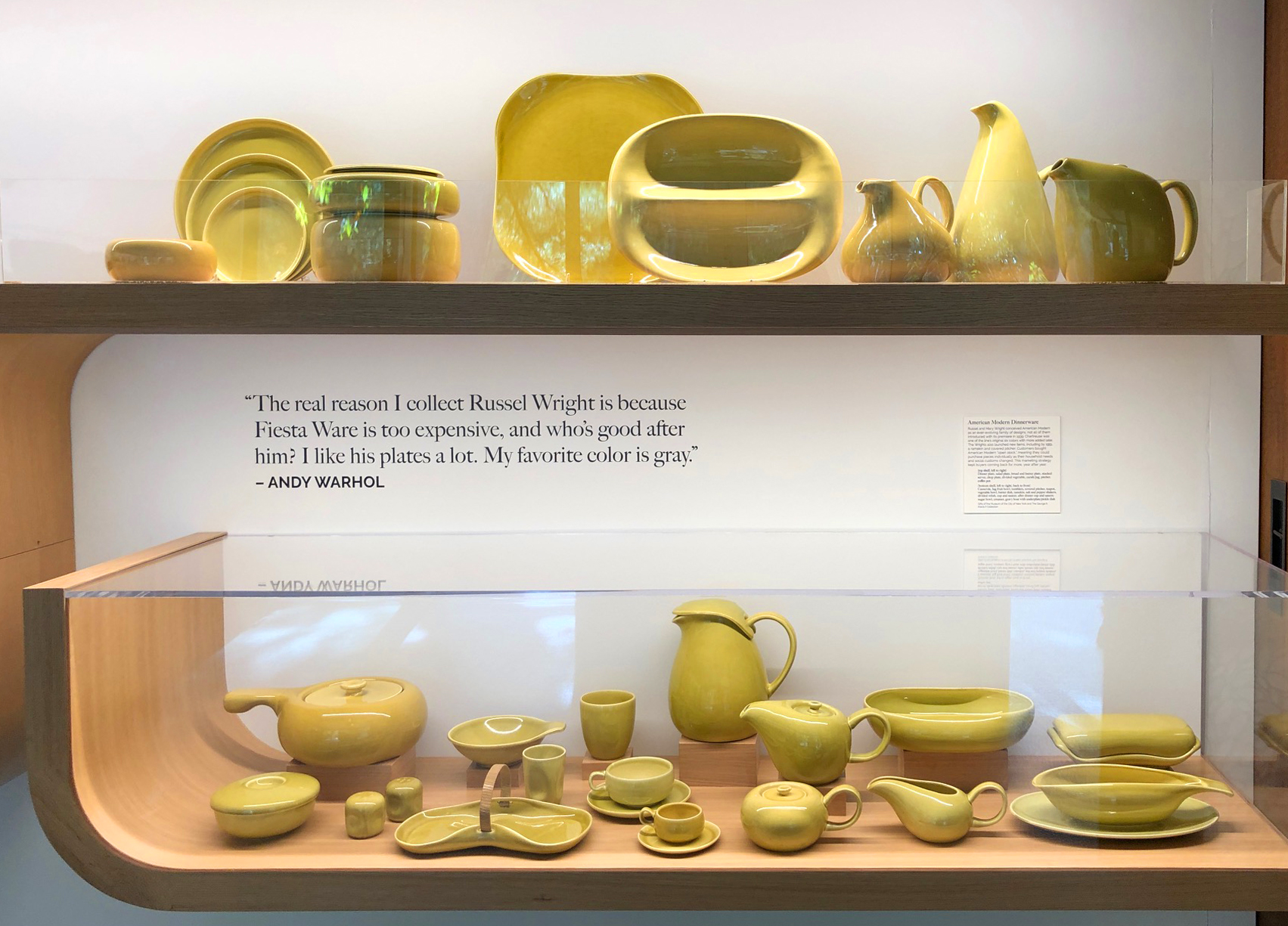
American Modern pottery in chartreuse

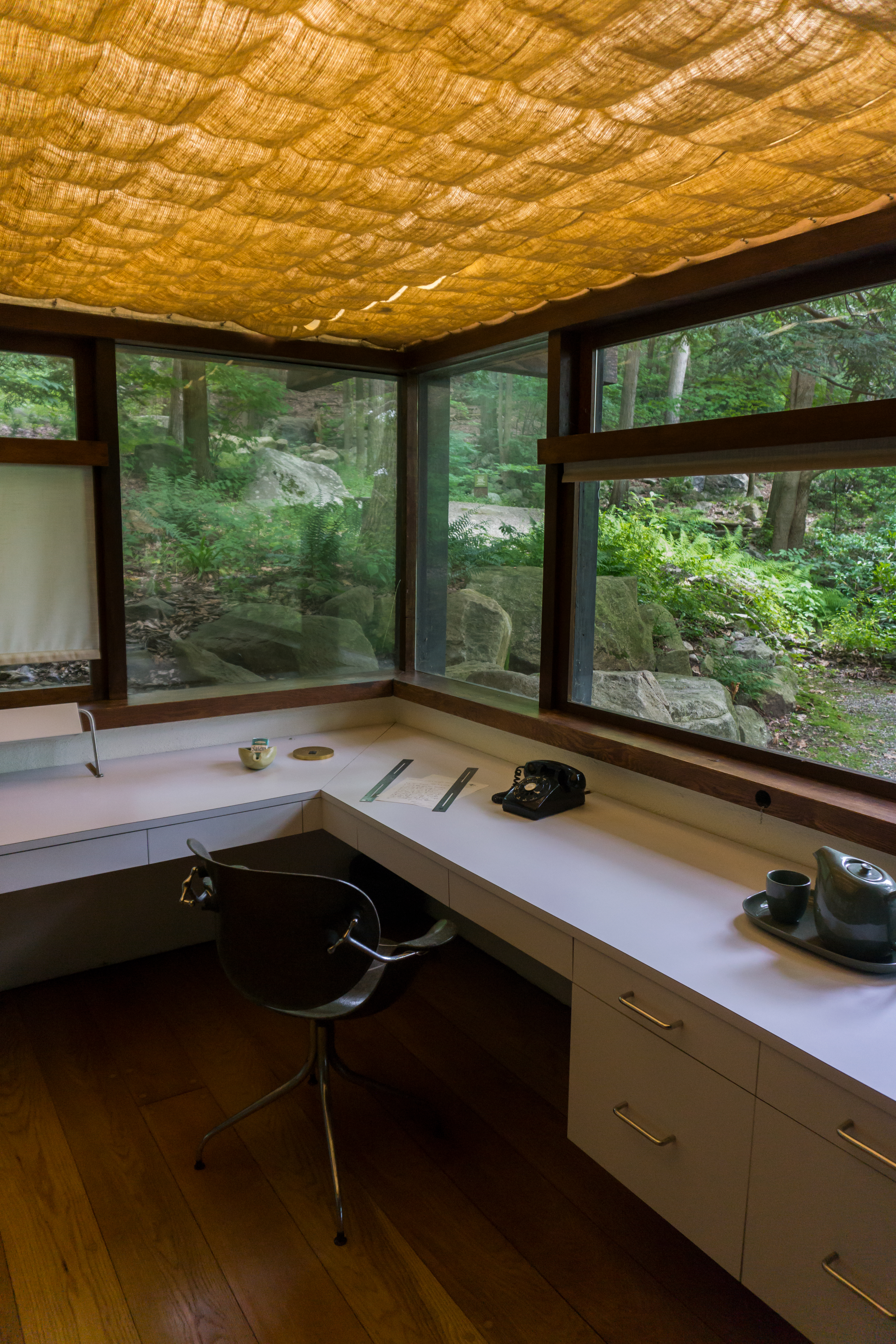
Studio desk

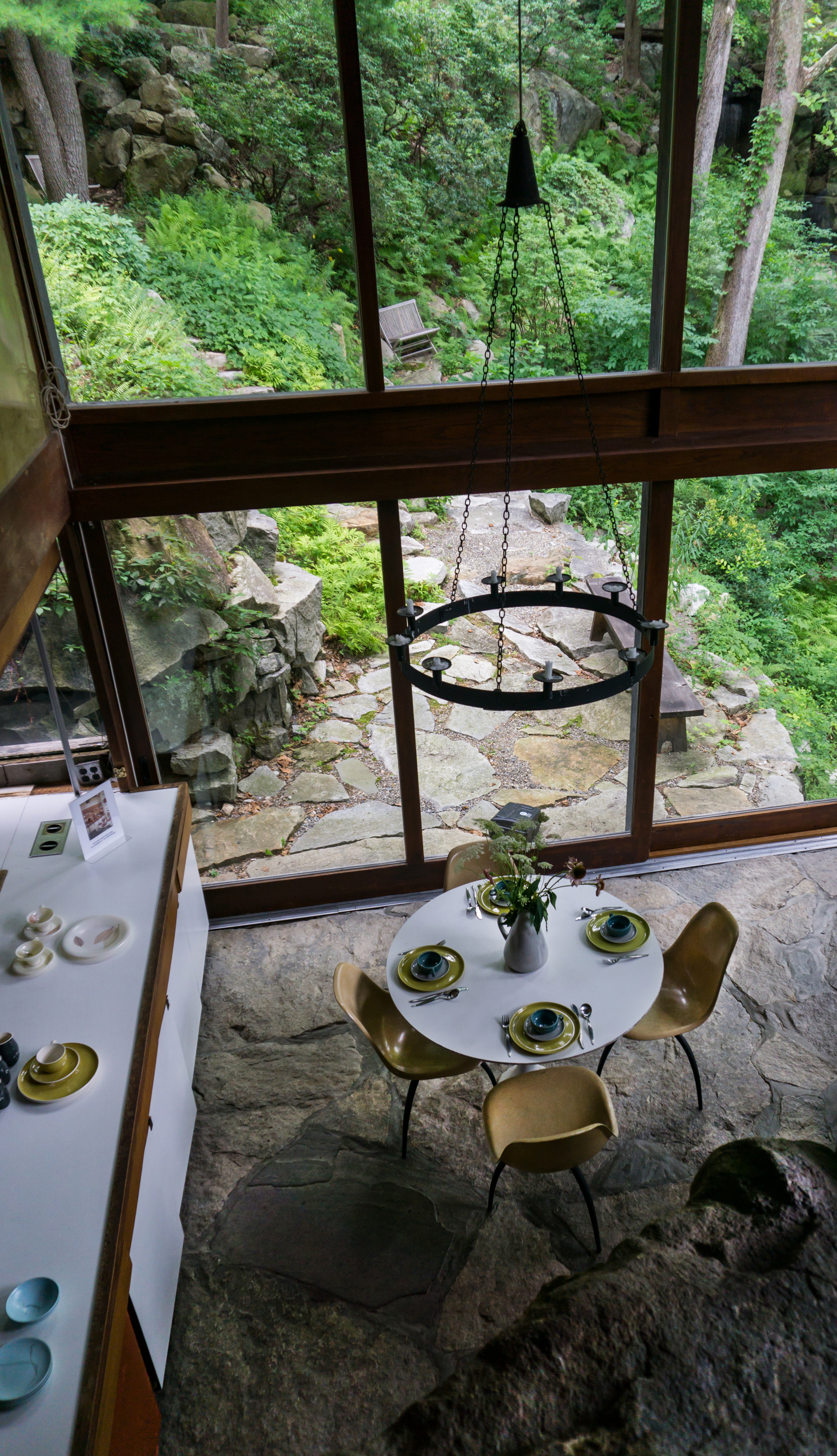
Dining room

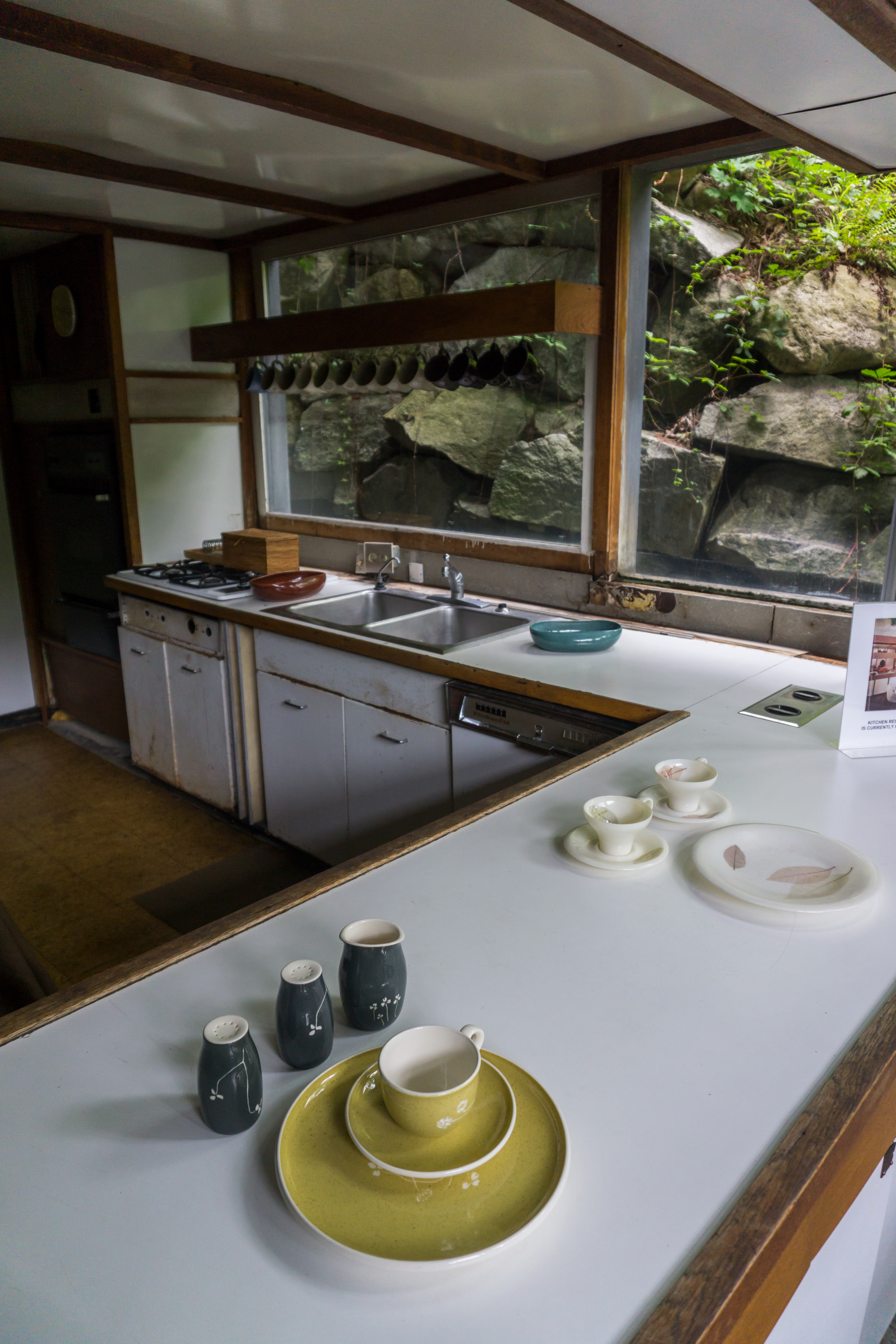
Kitchen

== See also ==
- National Register of Historic Places listings in Putnam County, New York
- List of National Historic Landmarks in New York
