= John Bernard Flannagan =

American sculptor (1895–1942)

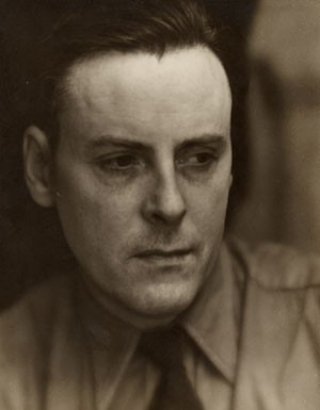
John B. Flannagan, c. 1930. Photo by Knox Hall Montgomery, Archives of American Art, Smithsonian Institution, Forbes Watson Papers.

John Bernard Flannagan (April 7, 1895 – January 6, 1942) was an American sculptor. Along with Robert Laurent and William Zorach, he is known as one of the first practitioners of direct carving (also known as taille directe) in the United States.

== Early years ==
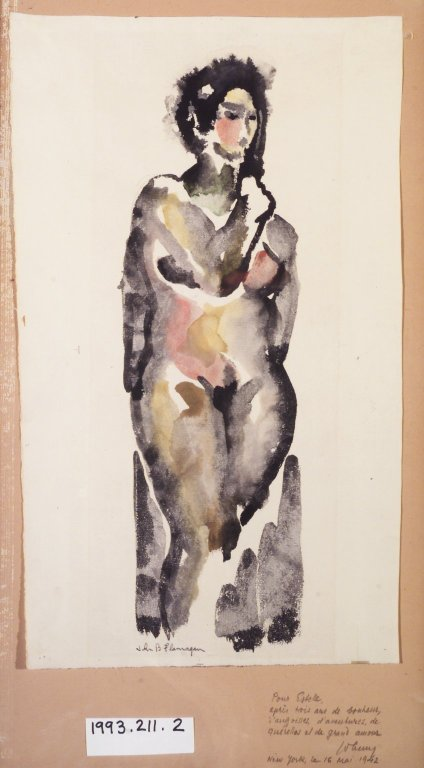
Female Nude by John B. Flannagan

Flannagan was born in Fargo, North Dakota, on April 7, 1895. His father died when he was only five years old, and his mother, unable to support her family, placed him in an orphanage. "Unrelenting poverty . . . was to plague him for the rest of his life." He also suffered from severe depression and alcoholism, which ultimately led to his suicide.

== Education ==
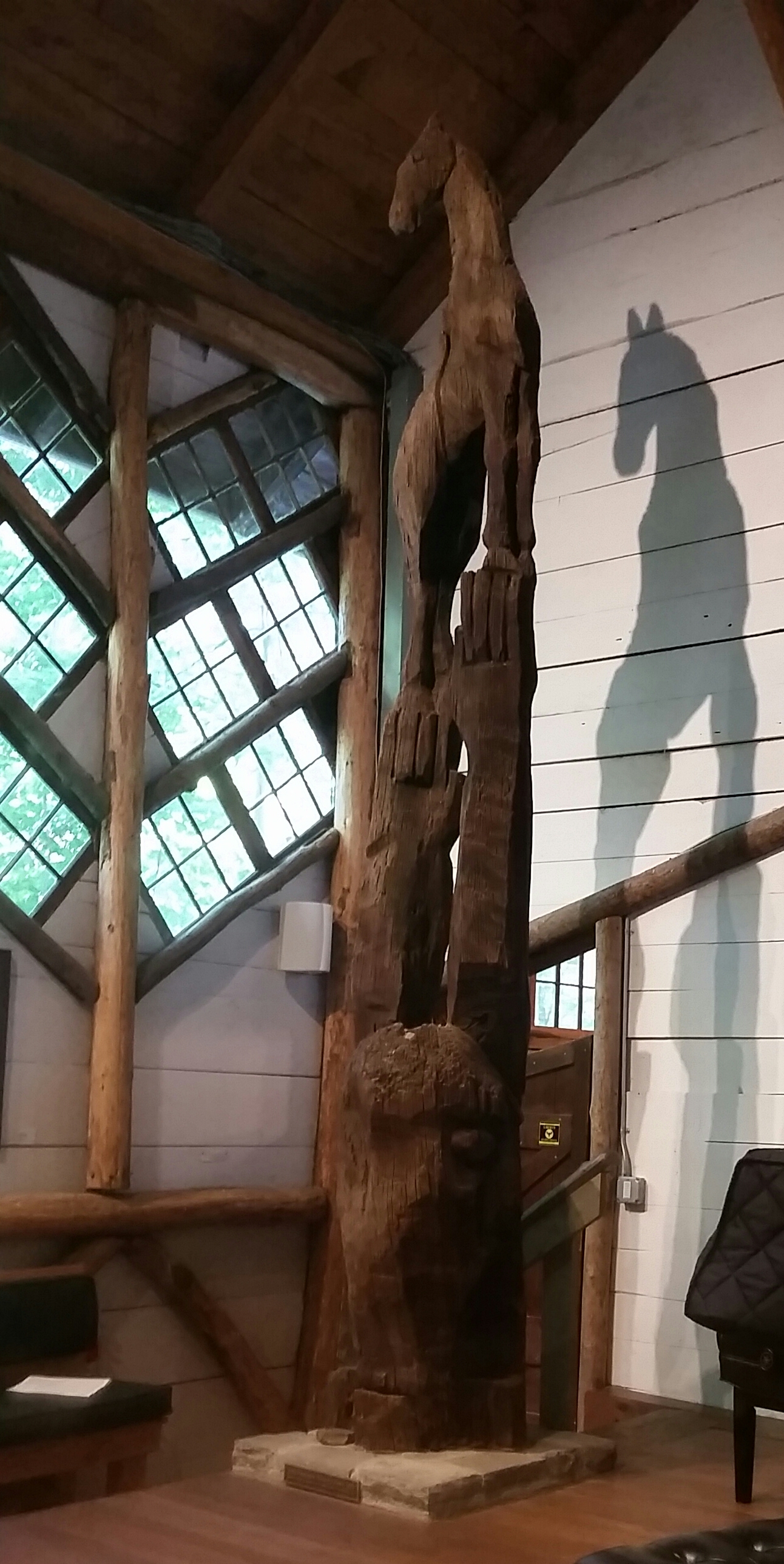
The Maverick Horse by John B. Flannagan

In his youth, Flannagan was recognized as possessing artistic talents, and in 1914 he attended the Minneapolis School of Art, now the Minneapolis College of Art and Design, where he studied painting. When the United States entered World War I in 1917, Flannagan quit school and joined the Merchant Marines. He remained a merchant marine until 1922. After his return to civilian life, he was hired by painter Arthur B. Davies to work on Davies' farm in New York State. There Davis encouraged the young man to return to painting, which he did, also taking up wood carving. A year later, in 1922, Flannagan appeared in his first exhibition, along with Davies, Walt Kuhn, Charles Sheeler, William Glackens, Charles Prendergast, and Maurice Prendergast. In 1927 Flannagan gave up painting and wood carving to concentrate on stone carving. In 1928 he produced some of the first American direct carved stone sculptures of note, one of which is entitled "Pelican."

== Mature years ==
The years between 1930 and 1933 found Flannagan, now married, in Ireland. There he mastered the technique of carving stones that he scavenged from the Irish countryside into sculptures, typically small animals. He felt that "there exists an image within every rock." His "aim [was] to produce a sculpture that hardly feels carved, but rather to have always been that way."

Back in the United States by 1934, Flannagan found work with the PWAP, the Depression-era government program that sponsored American artists. He received this position, his only means of support at the time, through the influence of Juliana Force, the first director of the Whitney Museum of American Art. Force and Gertrude Vanderbilt Whitney had been longtime supporters of the sculptor, recognizing that he was a profoundly troubled man but also an exceptionally talented artist. Flannagan's time with the PWAP did not go smoothly. "The artist's alcoholism was always problematic: he alternated marathon work sessions with drinking bouts. Indeed, Flannagan had put in ninety hours one week and then took the next two weeks off, as was his custom. He worked until he was utterly exhausted and then drank to blot out the fatigue." He lost his job with the PWAP.

His ensuing mental breakdown and seven months' incarceration in a mental institution, followed by a divorce, did not lessen Flannagan's resolve to produce as much quality sculpture as possible, but, in 1939, after being struck by a car and sustaining a severe closed head injury, it became increasingly difficult for him to function.

== Last years ==
Destitute, depressed and suffering from ill health, Flannagan committed suicide on January 6, 1942.

== Critical reputation ==
Even posthumously, Flannagan has not always received the critical attention that other sculptors of his time of equivalent talent have enjoyed. Art historian Sam Hunter provided one judgement in his survey of modern American art:

A controlled Expressionism was also the basis of the style of one of the most interesting stone carvers who emerged in the 1930s, John B. Flannagan. Flannagan's earlier work had been Gothic images of suffering, attenuated free-standing figures in wood handled like bas-relief with affinities to both German Expressionism and primitive Christian art. In the next decade his style broadened, becoming more ample and rounded; in place of expressionist torment, he substituted an effective and personal motif...his subjects were almost exclusively drawn from the animal and insect kingdom, although he executed a number of sensitive portraits and figure compositions.

Hunter compared Flannagan's sensibility to "the visionary, romantic art of Albert Pinkham Ryder and Morris Graves," adding that "the microscopic sensibilities of such American poets as Emily Dickinson and Marianne Moore support and confirm the native authenticity of Flannagan's touching, creatural realism."
