= Petra Cabot =

American designer and artist

Petra Cabot (February 21, 1907 – October 13, 2006) was an American designer and artist, perhaps best known for styling of the Skotch Kooler for the Hamilton Metal Products Company. According to The New York Times, the Skotch Kooler could keep ice cream firm for three hours without ice and was handy for fishing trips, keeping "groceries cold on the way to the lake and fish cold on the way back." The container had a volume of four gallons. The structure was composed of "three layers of insulation: one of fiberglass, one of inert air and a heat-reflecting outer surface." These coolers have become popular as collectibles.

Cabot was born in Philadelphia, Pennsylvania, on February 21, 1907. She trained as an artist and worked as a designer, mural painter and in the theatre. She designed dinnerware for Russel Wright from 1938 to 1950. Cabot was married twice - to Laurence Jordan, a poet, which ended in divorce in 1931 and to writer/publisher Blake Cabot, who died in 1974. She died in her home in Woodstock, New York, on October 13, 2006.
