= Maverick Concert Hall =

- U.S. National Register of Historic Places
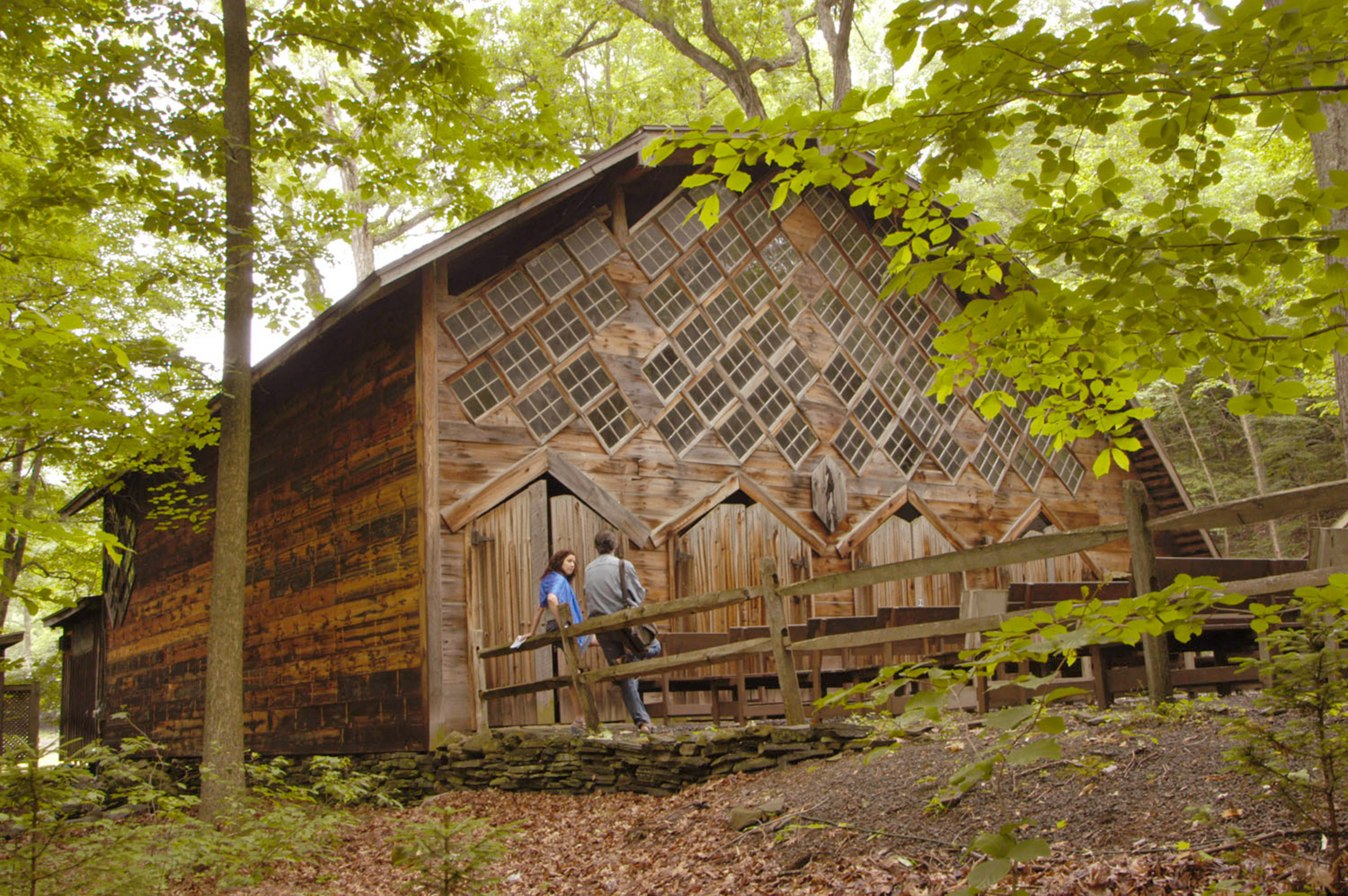
- Maverick Concert Hall, Summer 2006

- Location within New York Location within the United States
- Location: Off Maverick Rd., Hurley, New York
- Coordinates: 42°0′51″N 74°7′6″W
- Area: 29.5 acres (11.9 ha)
- Built: 1916
- Architect: White, Hervey
- NRHP reference No.: 99001492
- Added to NRHP: December 9, 1999

Maverick Concert Hall was built in 1916 and was part of the Maverick Artist Colony in Hurley, New York. The Maverick developed out of the Maverick Festival, an early 20th-century communal arts gathering near Woodstock that combined music, theater, and outdoor performance in a rustic woodland setting. Contemporary newspaper accounts described the Maverick Festival as a rustic outdoor arts community near Woodstock where music, theater, and dance were staged in converted woodland performance spaces.

The concert hall hosts the Maverick Concerts, a summer chamber music festival. Alexander Platt is the current music director. The mainstay of the series, which runs from the end of June through early September, is to be found in the chamber music concerts performed by distinguished soloists and ensembles on Saturday evenings and Sunday afternoons.

The Maverick Festival, a precursor to the Maverick Concerts, was founded in 1915 by Hervey White, and by 1931 the festival suspended. Maverick’s early years portrayed the colony as an experiment in independent artistic living that drew prominent artists, musicians, and literary figures to Woodstock.

== Maverick Artist Colony history ==
“Maverick” is the name given to the collaborative colony for artists that Hervey White, a “freethinker, socialist, writer, and printer with a genius for friendship,” established on the outskirts of the town of Woodstock, on 102 acres he had bought in 1905. White's intention was to offer “young talent a chance to earn its living until its recognition.”

Hervey White had been an early founder and worker at the nearby Byrdcliffe Colony and he was one of the first to leave and start a new colony independently. The Byrdcliffe Colony had been "well-financed and run somewhat autocratically" with a strong sense of designing and planning a legacy and Maverick was "scruffier, more truly communal and anarchic".

== Maverick Festival (1915–1931) ==
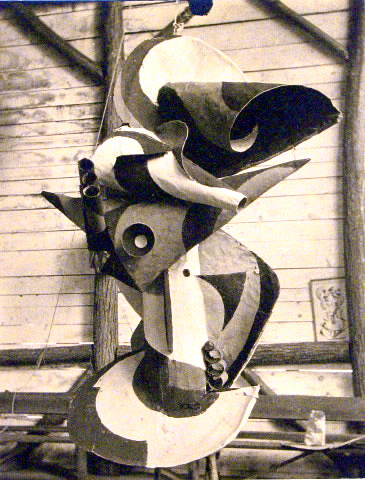
Costume design by Russel Wright for "Cubist Circus" at the 1923 Maverick Festival

The Maverick Festival's opening concert was in August 1915 to raise funds in order to build a well for the colony, and was patterned after the European fairs. The following year in July 1916, a substantial article about the event was published in The New York Times, under the headline “Music Goes Back to Nature.” The program consisted of Haydn's String Quartet Op. 77, No. 1, Max Bruch's Kol Nidrei for cello and piano, and Robert Schumann's piano quintet.

By the early 1920s, the Maverick Festival had become a major cultural event in the Catskills, drawing large crowds and elaborate costumed pageants involving artists, actors, and visitors from New York and beyond. The festival was popular and as the audience grew larger, they introduced concert camping, and became harder to control. There was a lot of drinking and hard partying happened at the festival, even during the Prohibition banning alcohol. After 1931, the Maverick Festival was suspended indefinitely due to unsavory crowds and financial pressures.

The Maverick Festival is often named as being one of the precursors to the 1969 Woodstock festival.

== Maverick Concert Hall ==
The historic concert hall is located in Hurley, New York, on the outskirts of Woodstock, in Ulster County. The barn-like, rectangular building with its gambrel roof was built in 1916 with a roof of asphalt and wood shingles and a frame of heavy timber, to which the walls—sheaths of wide planks—are nailed directly. The hall was constructed without the services of an architect and with volunteer labor, as part of the arts community known as the Maverick Colony.

The wooden construction and acoustics create an environment well suited to the intimacy of live chamber music, and the Maverick has been listed on the National Register of Historic Places since 1999.

=== Maverick Horse ===
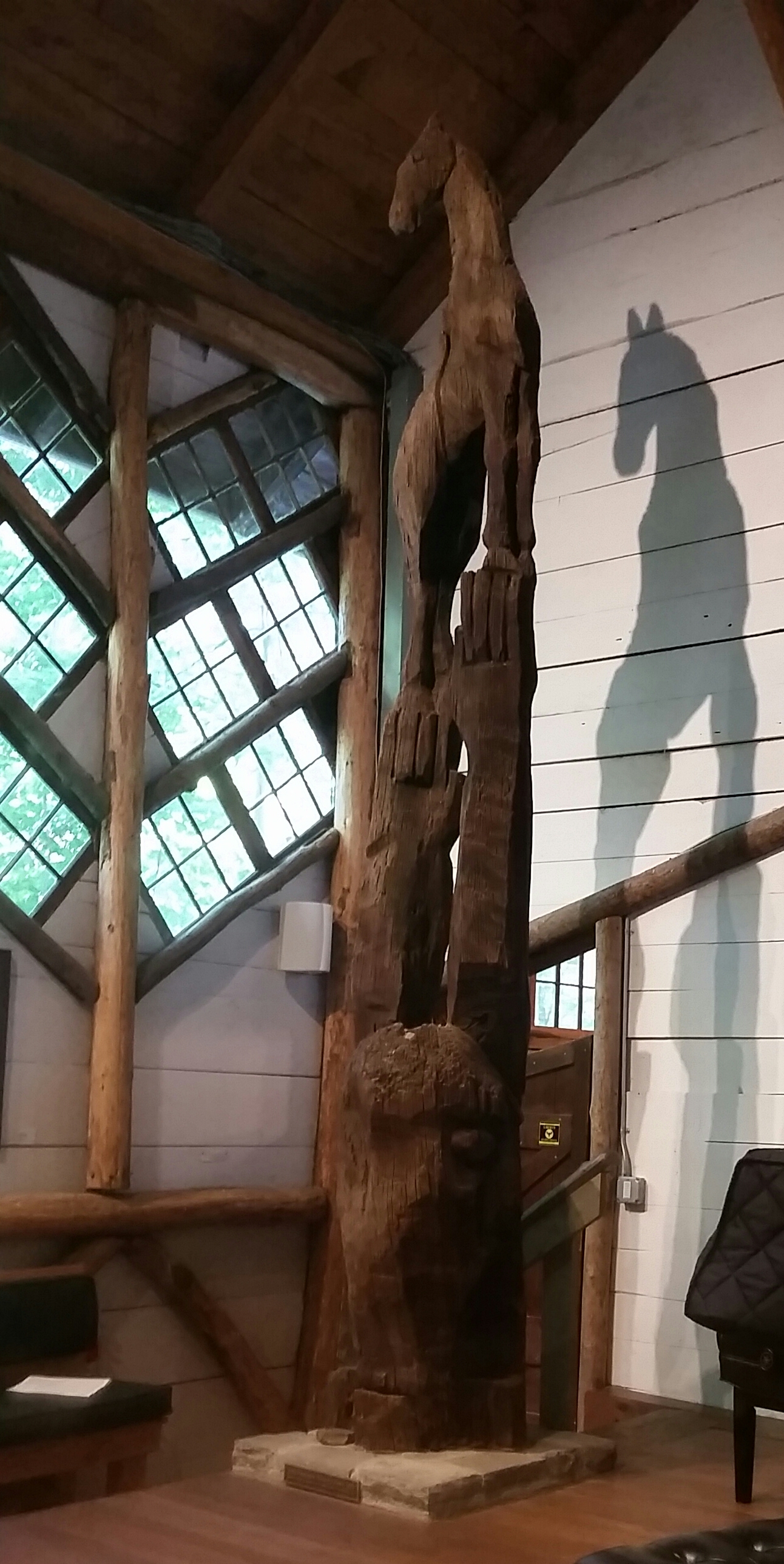

In the summer of 1924, Mr. White commissioned John Flannagan, a gifted but penniless sculptor, to create a symbol for the colony. Flannagan, one of the first direct carvers to work in the United States, was paid the prevailing wage of fifty cents an hour. Using an ax as his major tool, in a few days he had carved a monumental piece from the trunk of a chestnut tree.

The statue depicts the horse emerging from the outstretched hands of a man, who appears, in turn, to be emerging from the earth. The iconic 18-foot sculpture stood, for 36 years, at the entrance of the road to the concert hall and the now-vanished theater. After the horse began to weather alarmingly, it was moved to a nearby studio until 1979, when it was moved to the stage of the Maverick Concert Hall. A plaque at its base indicates that it was restored in 2006. It stands there still.

== John Cage and 4’33" ==
On August 29, 1952, the young pianist and composer David Tudor premiered at the Maverick a well-known and controversial work by the American exponent of experimental music John Cage, one of the leading post-war avant-garde composers. Arguably Cage's most famous piece, 4′33″ (which was originally scored for piano) has commonly been referred to as “four minutes and thirty-three seconds of silence.” Cage demonstrated, however, that the absence of notes was not the same thing as silence. The composer's stated intention was for the audience to listen to the “accidental” sounds around them: the birdsong, the wind in the trees, the rain on the roof, the sounds of the audience members themselves.

== Recent history and Maverick Concerts ==
The concert hall hosts the Maverick Concerts, a summer chamber music festival. Alexander Platt is the current music director. The mainstay of the series, which runs from the end of June through early September, is to be found in the chamber music concerts performed by distinguished soloists and ensembles on Sunday afternoons. Jazz and contemporary music have been given more prominence in recent seasons, and Saturday morning Maverick Family Concerts are popular with music lovers of all ages.
