= American Modern =

American design style

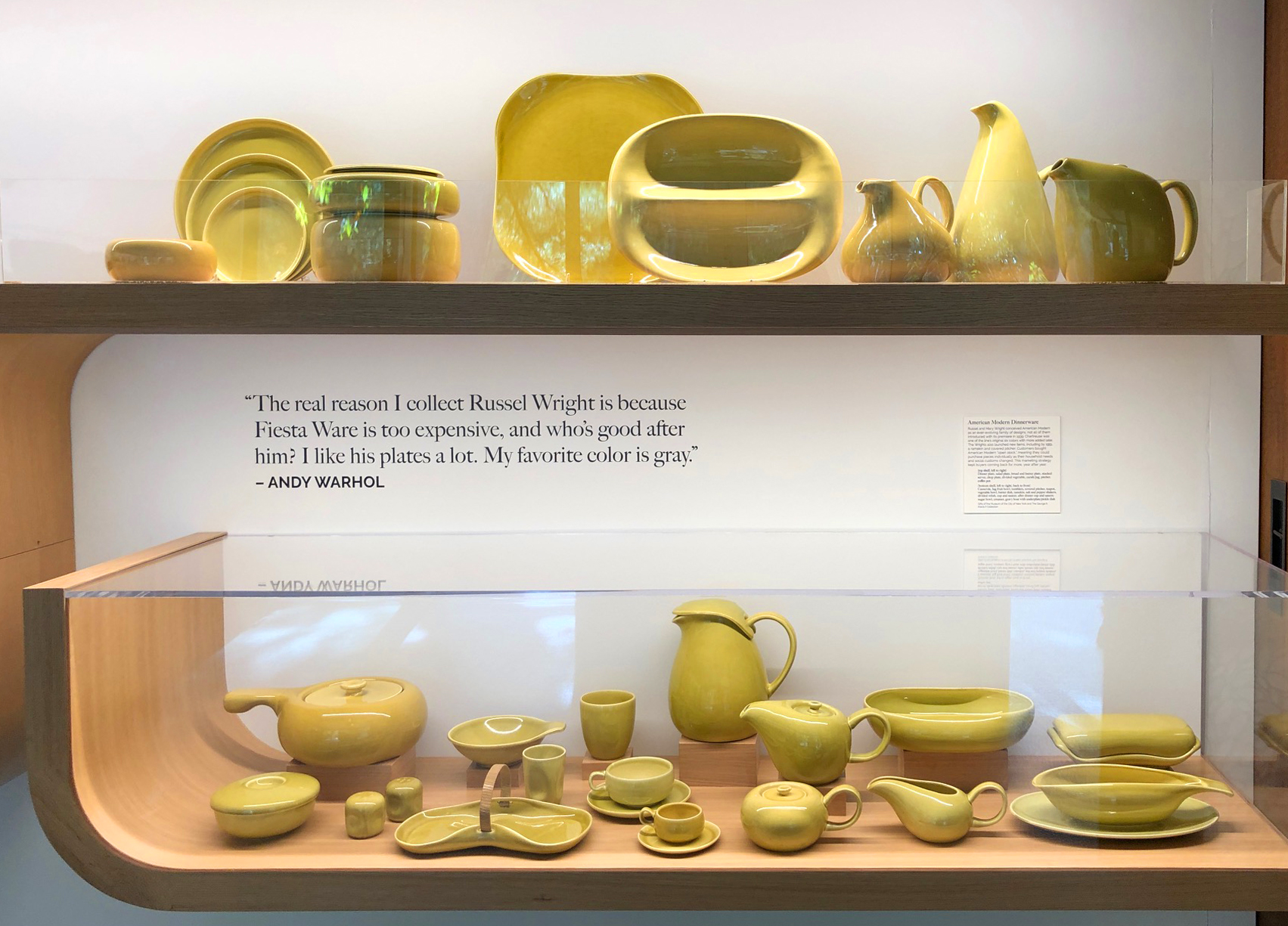
Russel Wright American Modern pottery

American Modern was a distinct American design aesthetic formed in the period between 1925 and World War II, related to American modernism, involving industrial design and decorative art. American Modern was created by a pioneering group of designers, architects and artists, including Norman Bel Geddes, Donald Deskey, Henry Dreyfuss, Paul T. Frankl, William Lescaze, Raymond Loewy, Gilbert Rohde, Eliel Saarinen, Walter Dorwin Teague, Kem Weber and Russel Wright. This design sensibility impacted on the daily lives of ordinary Americans through an array of objects including furniture, glassware, ceramics, textiles, metalwork, household appliances, automobiles, airplanes and graphic arts. American Modern is distinguished by the absence of traditional ornament, the use of new technologies and materials, and the application of mass-production techniques to create affordable objects for the expanding middle class.

== American Modern dinnerware ==
American Modern dinnerware was designed by Russel Wright and was originally manufactured by Steubenville Pottery in Steubenville, Ohio. It is currently manufactured by Bauer Pottery Company of Los Angeles. The glaze colors of the line consist of coral, chartreuse, granite grey and seafoam. The dinnerware forms have distinctive curvilinear, streamlined shapes. American Modern dinnerware was the most popular and identifiable china pattern ever sold, with over 250 million pieces sold between 1939 – 1959.

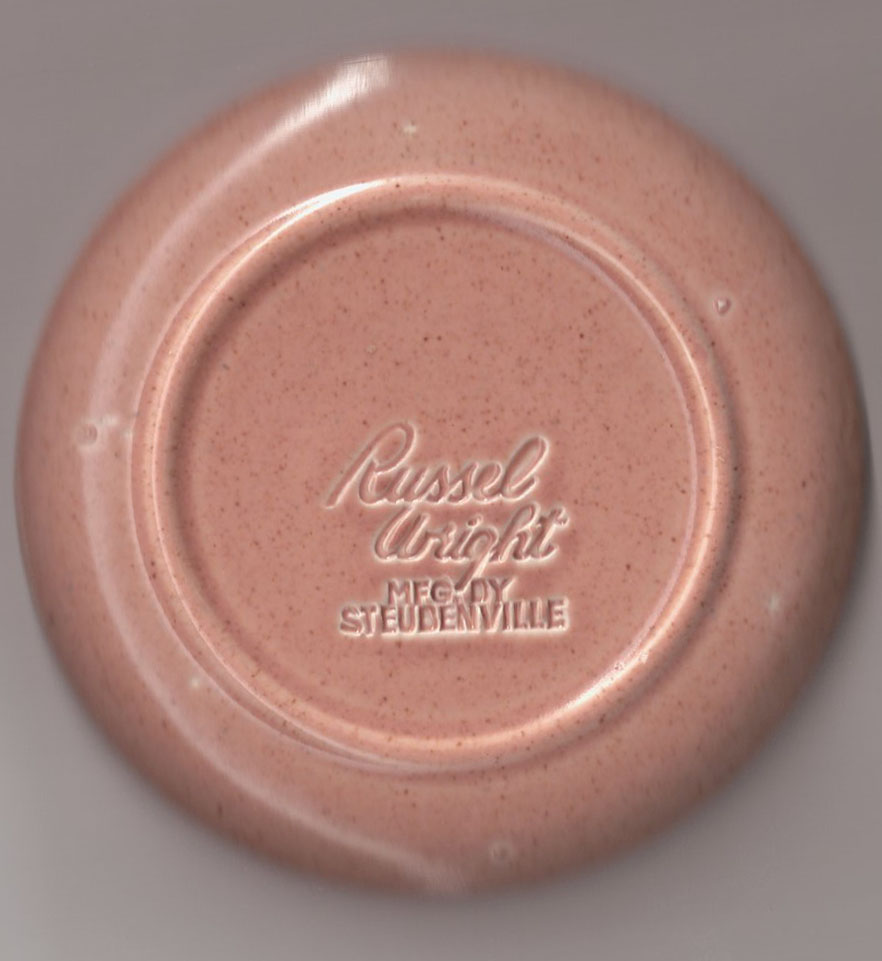
American Modern in Coral.

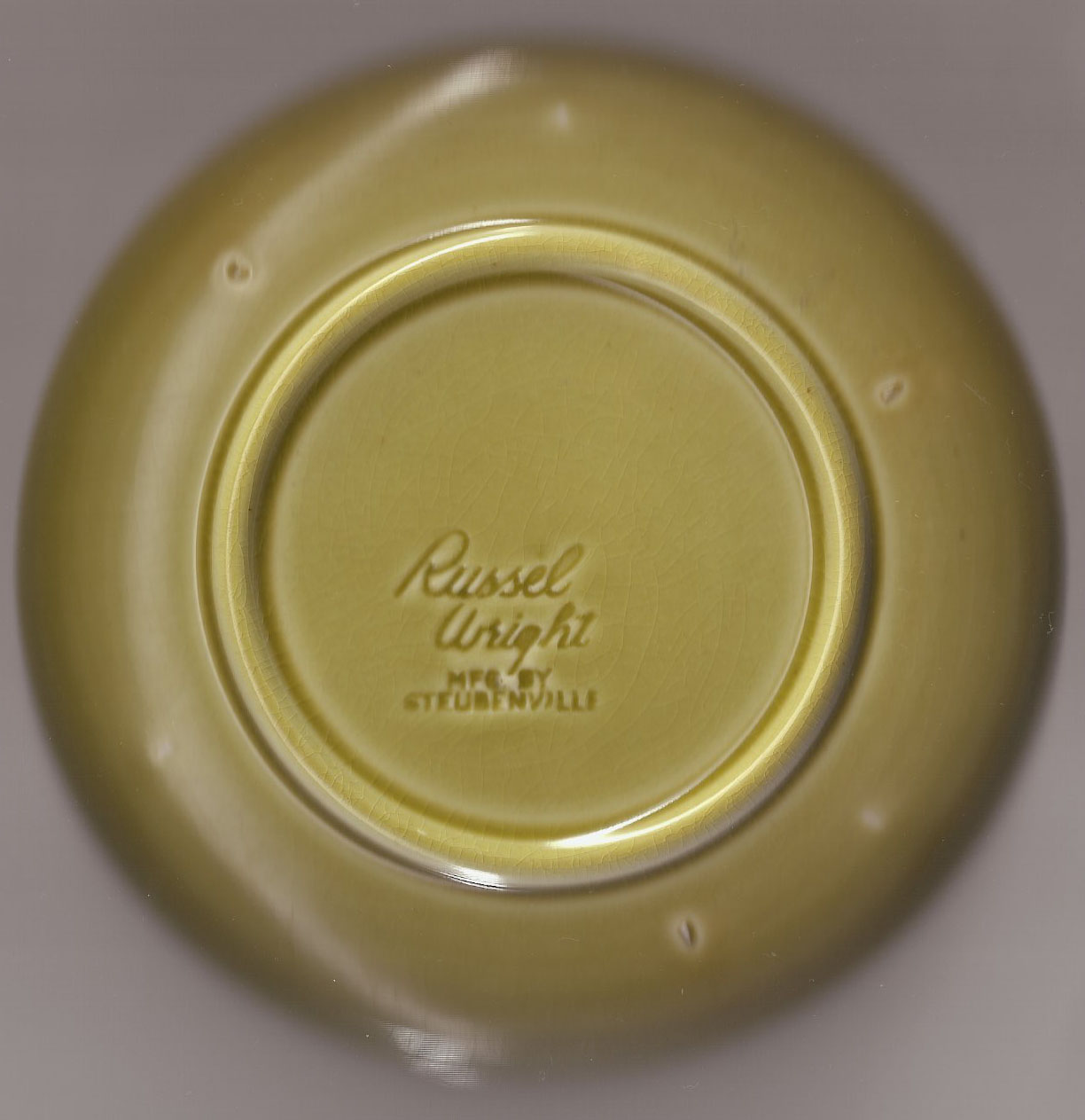
American Modern in Chartreuse.

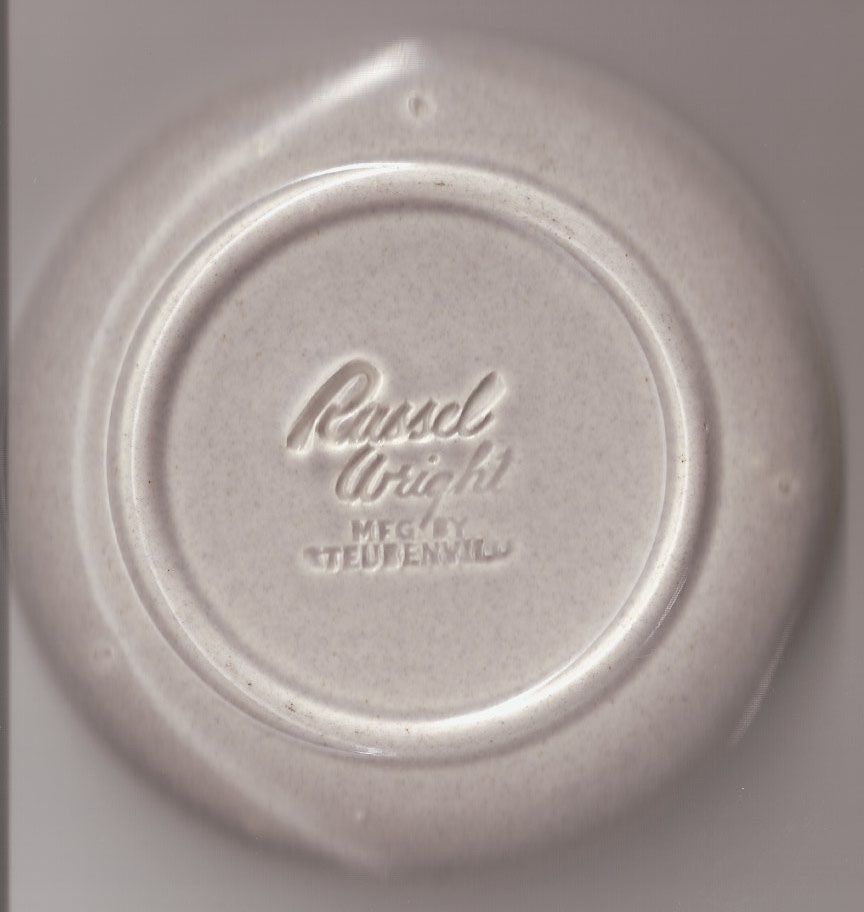
American Modern in Granite Grey.

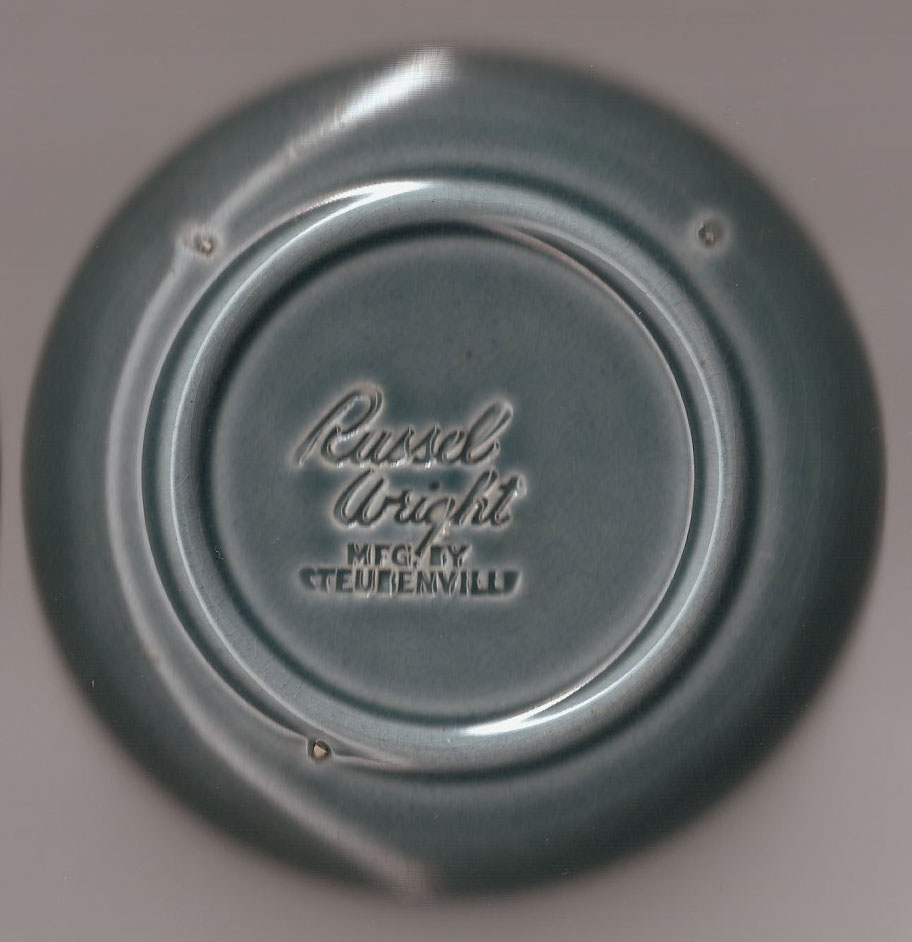
American Modern in Seafoam.

== Bibliography ==
- American Modern 1925-1940 - Design For A New Age by J. Stewart Johnson. (Harry Abrams, 2000) ISBN 1-885444-12-5.

== See also ==
- Art Deco
- Streamline Moderne
- Modern architecture
