= Ellen Phillips Samuel Memorial =

Public memorial in Philadelphia

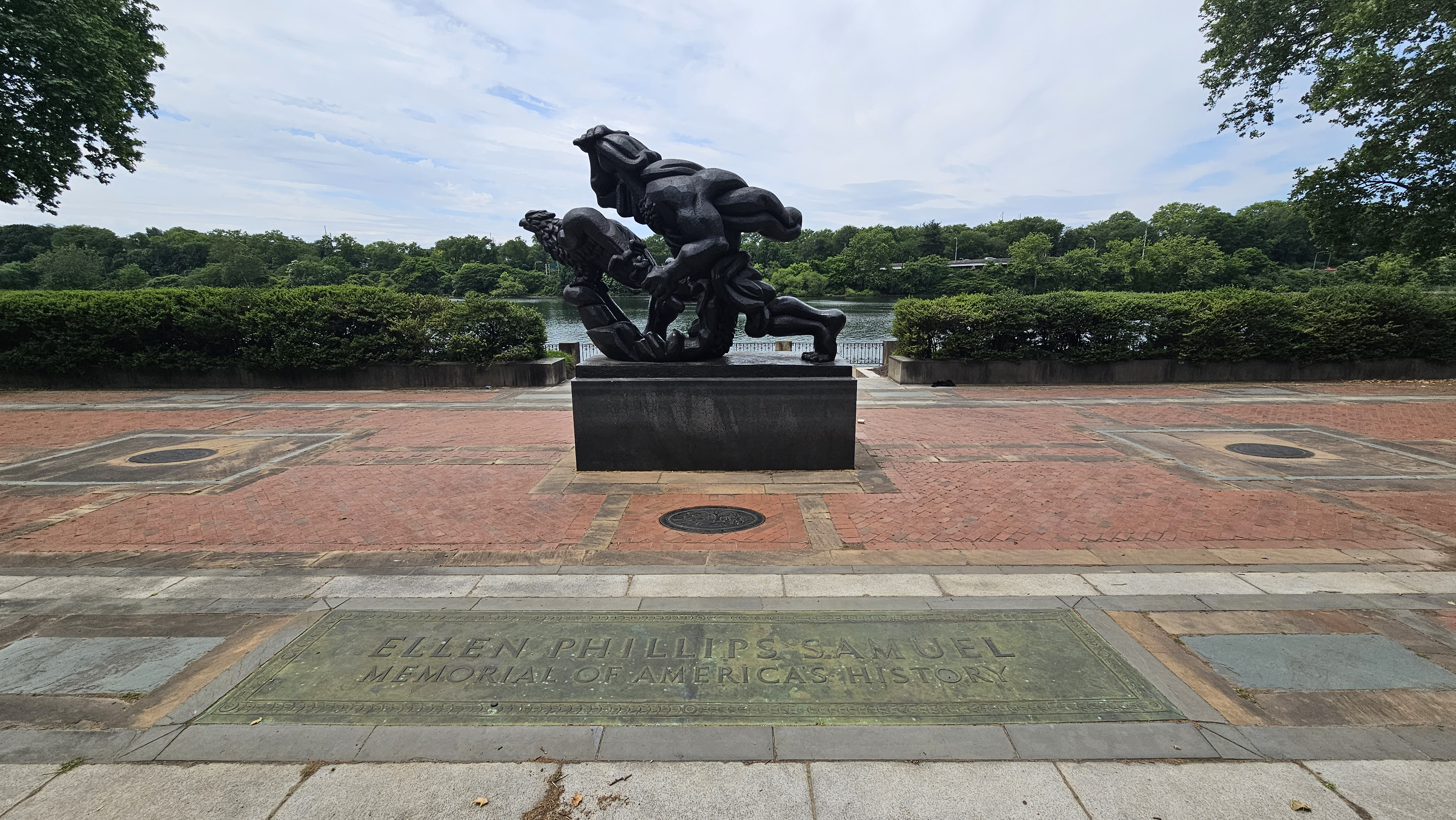
- The Spirit of Enterprise on the central terrace
- 39°58′25″N 75°11′27″W
- Location: Fairmount Park, Philadelphia, Pennsylvania, United States
- Designer: Multiple designers; overall design by Paul Philippe Cret
- Type: Sculpture garden
- Beginning date: 1933
- Completion date: 1960
- Dedicated date: 1961
- Dedicated to: Ellen Phillips Samuel

The Ellen Phillips Samuel Memorial is a sculpture garden located in Fairmount Park in Philadelphia, Pennsylvania, United States. The garden, located along the left bank of the Schuylkill River between Boathouse Row and the Girard Avenue Bridge, was established by the Fairmount Park Art Association (now the Association for Public Art) and dedicated in 1961.

The idea for a series of sculptures came from Ellen Phillips Samuel, a philanthropist who left a significant amount of money to the art association in her will, with the stipulation that it be used to erect public sculptures that would represent the history of the United States. Following the death of Ellen in 1913 and her husband several years later, the association organized a committee to oversee the creation of these monuments, with architect Paul Philippe Cret developing a plan for three connected terraces with distinct themes represented by the sculptures present in them. To select the sculptors for the memorial, the association organized three international art exhibitions held at the Philadelphia Museum of Art in 1933, 1940, and 1949, that attracted hundreds of sculptors and saw attendances in the hundreds of thousands. The final sculpture was erected in 1960 and the memorial was dedicated the following year.

The memorial has received generally mixed to negative reviews from art critics, with many criticizing the relationship between the sculptures and the surrounding architecture. For example, in a review of the memorial, architect Alfred Bendiner praised the architecture, but called the choice of sculptures "a most irritating collection of uninteresting examples of the work of outstanding men and women, most of whom have done much better elsewhere". Penny Balkin Bach, an executive director of the art association, has stated that the memorial is "as much a monument to the confusion about what constituted modern public art" as it is a memorial honoring Samuel. Additional criticism has centered on the memorial's Eurocentric depiction of American history.

== History ==
=== Ellen Phillips Samuel ===
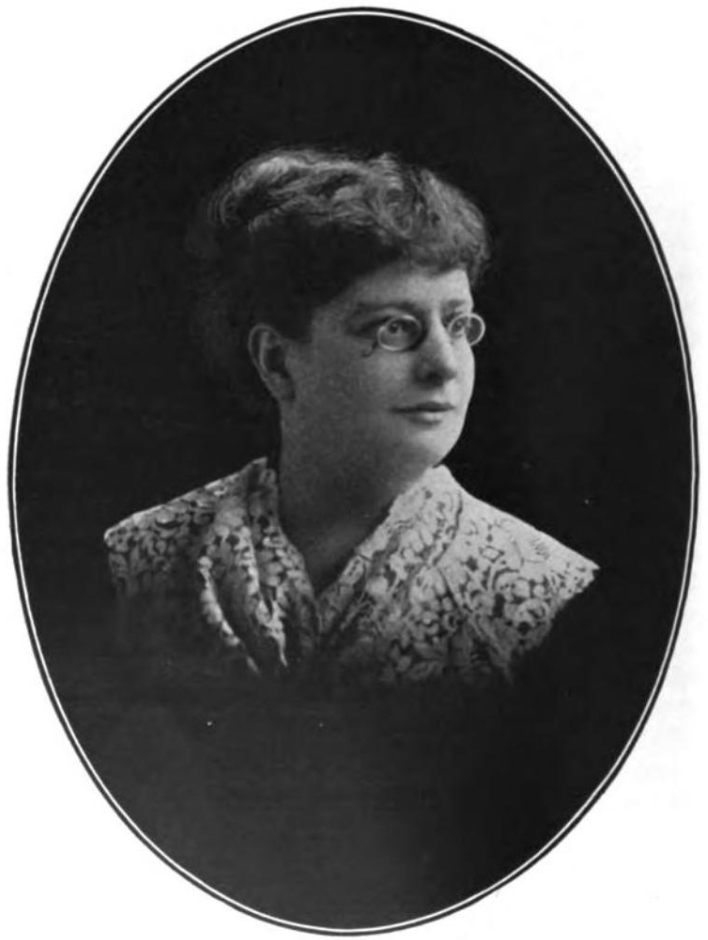
Ellen Phillips Samuel, c. 1910

Born on March 4, 1849, Ellen Phillips Samuel was a member of a prominent Philadelphia family, with her father being a distinguished member of the local bar association and her uncle, Henry Myer Phillips, being a member of the United States House of Representatives. As an adult, she was an active member of the Fairmount Park Art Association, a private nonprofit public art organization in the city. (Note: The Fairmount Park Art Association was renamed the Association for Public Art in 2012.) Upon her death in 1913, she bequeathed much of her estate to the art association, specifying that the revenue raised from it be used to erect public sculptures that were "emblematic of the history of America—ranging in time from the earliest settlers of America to the present era". At the time, the bequeathment was reportedly one of the largest of its kind, amounting to over $500,000 (equivalent to $15.91 million in 2024). (Note: According to the records of the Fairmount Park Art Association in 1922, the bequeathment totaled $765,000 (equivalent to $22,700,000 in 2022). However, in a 1974 book, Robert Sturgis Ingersoll, former president of the Philadelphia Museum of Art, reported that the amount was closer to $700,000 (equivalent to $20,700,000 in 2022). Additionally, a 2024 article published on WHYY.org stated that the amount was "about $800,000" ($15.91 million in 2024).) In 1969, separate from her will-stipulated memorial, the art association erected a fountain in John F. Kennedy Plaza in her honor.

=== Initial plans ===
According to architect Alfred Bendiner, Samuel had been inspired by a statue-lined canal she had visited in Padua and hoped to emulate that with a row of statues along the Schuylkill River, on a 2,000-foot (610 m) stretch of land from Boathouse Row to the Girard Avenue Bridge, near Laurel Hill Cemetery. As a result, after her death, her widower J. Bunford Samuel commissioned Icelandic sculptor Einar Jónsson to create a sculpture of Thorfinn Karlsefni, an early European explorer of North America. The sculpture was erected near the Sedgeley Club along the Schuylkill River in Fairmount Park, in line with Samuel's will, which stipulated the location of the monuments to be in the park along East River Drive. (Note: The road has since been renamed Kelly Drive.) Bunford hoped for the statue to be the first part of the memorial, which would consist of a series of 20 statues of individuals from American history organized along the left bank of the river in 200-foot (61 m) increments. Some in the local art community criticized Bunford for his selection of a non-American sculptor for the project, and according to Bendiner, there were efforts to prevent the statue from being erected in the park. After the statue's erection, Bunford abandoned any plans to commission more art, though he remained hopeful that the overall idea for a row of statues would eventually be executed. However, this plan would not come to fruition.

In 1929, following Bunford's death, (Note: Sources differ on the year of Bunford's death. An article on the memorial garden on the Association for Public Art's website states that he died in 1929, though a 2023 article published on WHYY.org gives the year of his death as 1927.) the funds became fully available to the art association, though plans for the memorial were not acted upon until the Great Depression. Following this, the association created a committee to oversee the erection of these new monuments, with the members chosen by association president Eli Kirk Price II. This committee, consisting predominately of young men, rejected Bunford's plans for a row of life-like statues and instead opted for more abstract sculptures that highlighted the "expression of the ideas, the motivations, the spiritual forces, and the yearnings that have created America". The committee hired Paul Philippe Cret, a professor of architecture at the University of Pennsylvania, who created an overall design for the memorial, which would consist of three connected terraces along the Schuylkill River just south of the Girard Avenue Bridge that would house various sculptures. The south terrace would represent the founding of the United States as a democratic republic and the settlement of the East Coast, the central terrace would represent westward expansion, the end of slavery, and immigration, and the north terrace would represent the more esoteric values that defined the country. As part of the design, Cret designed much of the overall architecture for the memorial, including exedrae. In January 1933, the committee met and approved an overall plan for the development of the memorial that would allow for the sculptors to have a large degree of freedom in their interpretation of the themes. The committee also decided on a series of quotes that would be inscribed on the architecture of the memorial.

=== First Sculpture International (1933) ===
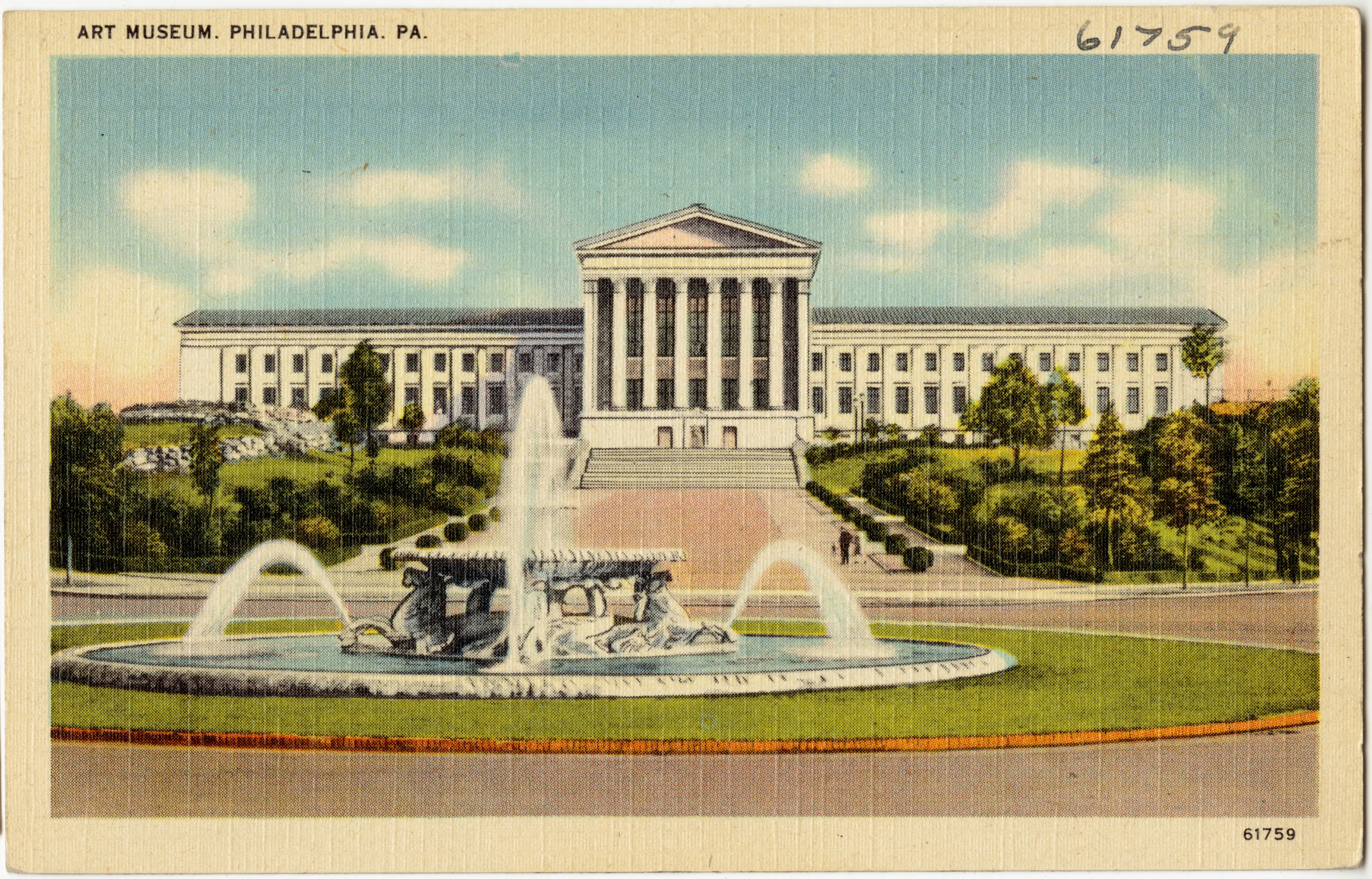
To determine which artists to commission for the memorial, the Fairmount Park Art Association organized several art exhibitions at the Philadelphia Museum of Art.

In selecting the sculptors who would create art for the memorial, Samuel had asked the art association to put requests in newspapers around the world, offering to cover any shipping costs. Seeking to honor her wishes, the committee sent requests to sculptors around the world to submit designs for the memorial and offered to pay for transporting select works. The art association partnered with the Philadelphia Museum of Art and the Philadelphia Art Alliance to hold an international art exhibition at the museum called the Sculpture International, which ran from May through September 1933. The exhibition featured 364 works by 105 artists from the United States, England, France, Germany, Romania, Russia, and Spain. It was covered by newspapers nationwide, with many calling it one of the largest sculpture exhibitions in the country's history, and the museum saw its attendance double. According to committee member Robert Sturgis Ingersoll, museum curator Henri Gabriel Marceau was the "sparkplug of the endeavor" who led the organizing efforts for this and all future Sculpture Internationals.

The Public Ledger of Philadelphia held a reader straw poll, with voters selecting the works of Walker Hancock, Carl Milles, Harry Rosin, Alexander Stirling Calder, William Zorach, and Albert Laessle as the best. However, the committee instead selected John Bernard Flannagan, Wallace Kelly, Hélène Sardeau (the only woman selected by the committee), and Heinz Warneke to create limestone sculptures, while Robert Laurent and Gaston Lachaise (later replaced by Maurice Sterne) would design bronze sculptures. (Note: Lachaise died in 1935 while working on his piece for the memorial, alternatively called Welcoming the Peoples or The Melting Pot. The work, which Lachaise had created a one-quarter scale model of, consisted of two nude figures, male and female, next to a column with depictions of people of various cultures throughout history. The committee later had the work cast in bronze and placed on display in the Philadelphia Museum of Art.) These sculptures would be installed in the central terrace. Other notable sculptors who participated in the 1933 Sculpture International include Alexander Archipenko, Jacques Lipchitz, Aristide Maillol, Henri Matisse, and Isamu Noguchi.

=== Second Sculpture International (1940) ===
In mid-1940, the committee held another Sculpture International, though the recent outbreak of the Second World War prevented many foreign artists from attending. Instead, many of the works by foreign artists on display at the exhibition were on loan from other American museums and private collectors, while many American sculptures were on loan from either the Whitney Museum of American Art or the federal government of the United States. At the time, the government had several New Deal agencies that directly employed artists, including the United States Department of the Treasury's Section of Fine Arts and the Federal Art Project of the Work Projects Administration (WPA). The exhibition opened on May 18 with 431 works on display and 90 WPA tour guides conducting visitors around the exhibition.

In contrast to the 1933 exhibition, the art featured in this Sculpture International displayed a great deal of diversity in material, composition, and style. Due to both material shortages and financial difficulties from the war, as well as new approaches to sculpture such as direct carving, materials featured in the exhibition's sculptures included aluminum, cast iron, cement, fieldstone, stainless steel, and wood, among others. The exhibition also featured a number of pieces of kinetic art, including two large mobiles by Calder and a rotating sculpture by Constantin Brâncuși displayed near the museum entrance. Art critics questioned the classification of several of the works as art, and there was a debate amongst the artists present on the value of abstract art over more realistic depictions. In the end, the committee selected Erwin Frey, Henry Kreis, Rosin, and Wheeler Williams to create works for the south terrace. These six were awarded commissions of $10,000 each, and in total, the sculptors selected from these two Sculpture Internationals were awarded $94,000 in commissions.

=== Third Sculpture International (1949) ===
With the entry of the United States into World War II in 1941, work on the memorial largely ceased for the next several years. However, following the conclusion of World War II in 1945, another Sculpture International was held in 1949. The exhibition featured 252 displays and was attended by over a quarter of a million people. Life magazine called the exhibition "the world's biggest sculpture show" and published a famous image of 70 of the sculptors whose works were on display. According to sculptor Jo Davidson, who was in attendance, "Never had so many sculptors been scrubbed and assembled in one place before". This was the first of the Sculpture Internationals where pieces were for sale, and the art association purchased several other works that they would later install around the city. From this exhibition, the committee selected Ahron Ben-Shmuel, Jose de Creeft, Koren der Harootian, and Waldemar Raemisch to design stone works for the north terrace, while Lipchitz and Jacob Epstein were selected to craft bronze sculptures. (Note: Epstein was a replacement for the committee's first choice, Gerhard Marcks, after he withdrew from the commission when the committee found his studies unsatisfactory.) Almost all of the selected artists were either born or living outside of the United States, prompting committee member Ingersoll to call the group "an artistic League of Nations".

=== Dedication and later history ===
In 1986, The Spirit of Enterprise was moved from the north terrace to its current location in the central terrace.

In 1960, Lipchitz's bronze work was placed at the north terrace, marking the final piece installed at the memorial. The following year, the memorial was formally dedicated. A commemorative plaque affixed to the structure reads:

Ellen Phillips Samuel Memorial 1957
Sculptors, architects, and trustees of the Fairmount Park Art Association, under whose direction joined in the creation of 'The Emblematic History of the United States'.

In 1985, Stone Age in America, a statue by John J. Boyle, was relocated from the Sweetbriar mansion to a location just south of the memorial where, according to the Association for Public Art (aPA), "it expands on the Memorial's sculptural evocation of American history". The next year, Jacques Lipchitz's bronze work, The Spirit of Enterprise, was relocated from the memorial's north terrace to the central terrace to increase its visibility to the public. In 2018, the statue of Thorfinn Karlsefni was removed from its pedestal by vandals who pushed the monument into the Schuylkill River. This came during a period of time when the Keystone State Skinheads had been using the statue as a meeting place. The statue was later recovered by the aPA, and as of 2023, it is in storage. In 2023, the aPA announced the installation of a temporary, exhibition, Steel Bodies, by sculptor Maren Hassinger, that would be on display from June 12 to November 12. The exhibition, consisting of ten steel sculptures, is the first contemporary art exhibition held at the memorial and, according to the aPA, is part of the association's "commitment to reanimate, reimagine and reinterpret the historic site within a contemporary context".

== Sculptures ==
=== Central Terrace ===
Name sculptor	Image	Year(s)	Material	Notes	References
Spanning the Continent; Robert Laurent		1937; installed 1938	Bronze, on granite base	The first sculpture installed in the memorial, this sculpture depicts the spirit of rugged individualism and western expansion, with a man and a woman marching across the continent, holding a wheel and an axe.	
Welcoming to Freedom; Maurice Sterne		1939	Bronze, on granite base	This sculpture, featuring two male figures, one seated and one standing, symbolizes the welcoming of oppressed people from around the world to the United States.	
The Ploughman; J. Wallace Kelly		1938	Limestone, on limestone base	This sculpture depicts a kneeling man, symbolizing the pioneers who settled the western frontier of the United States in search of new land and resources.	
The Miner; John Bernard Flannagan		1938	Limestone, on limestone base	This sculpture, depicting a kneeling man with a pickaxe by his side, symbolizes the many Americans who settled the western frontier in search of mineral wealth through mining.	
The Slave; Hélène Sardeau		1940	Limestone, on limestone base	This sculpture, depicting a kneeling man with opened shackles, symbolizes the liberation of enslaved people in the United States.	
The Immigrant; Heinz Warneke		1940	Limestone, on limestone base	This sculpture, depicting a kneeling man with a wooden staff and a bundle of cloth, symbolizes the struggle of immigrants to the United States.	
The Spirit of Enterprise; Jacques Lipchitz		1958; installed 1960; relocated 1986	Bronze, on granite base	This sculpture depicts a muscular pioneer moving forward, with a caduceus in one hand, alongside an eagle with outstretched wings. The sculpture consists of 20 separately-cast parts and has been compared to another work by Lipchitz, Prometheus Strangling the Vulture, installed outside the Philadelphia Museum of Art. At the time of the commission, the work was originally to be entitled Constructive Enterprise. Originally installed in the north terrace, it was relocated in 1986.	

=== South Terrace ===
Name sculptor	Image	Year(s)	Material	Notes	References
Settling of the Seaboard; Wheeler Williams		1942	Limestone, on granite base	This sculpture is a relief, depicting a standing young man, a standing young woman gesturing outwards and holding a baby in her arm, and a Native American man sitting by her side. The work symbolizes the earliest settlers of what is today the United States and is the only work in the memorial to depict a Native American.	
The Birth of a Nation; Henry Kreis		1942	Limestone, on a granite base	This sculpture is a relief depicting three men of varying ages and a cannon. It symbolizes the agreement among the people of the United States to create an independent, self-governing republic that would be free from outside influence.	
The Puritan; Harry Rosin		1942	Limestone, on granite base	This sculpture depicts a standing Puritan man holding a gun and, alongside its companion piece The Quaker, is intended to display the role of religion in the founding of the United States.	
The Quaker; Harry Rosin		1942	Limestone, on granite base	This sculpture depicts a standing Quaker man and, alongside its companion piece The Puritan, is intended to display the role of religion in the founding of the United States.	
The Revolutionary Soldier; Erwin Frey		1942	Limestone, on granite base	This sculpture depicts a standing soldier in the Continental Army, representing the strength of the United States Armed Forces.	
The Statesman; Erwin Frey		1942	Limestone, on granite base	This sculpture depicts a politician of the early American republic, symbolizing the political intelligence of the United States.	

=== North Terrace ===
Name sculptor	Image	Year(s)	Material	Notes	References
The Preacher; Waldemar Raemisch		1952; installed 1958	Granite, on granite base	This sculpture depicts a man speaking, with his hands cupped to his cheeks, symbolizing the religious leaders throughout American history.	
The Poet; Jose de Creeft		1954; installed 1959	Granite, on granite base	This sculpture depicts a poet holding his writings against his chest, symbolizing the authors who have influenced American culture and history through their works. It was de Creeft's first major commission in the United States.	
The Scientist; Koren der Harootian		1955; installed 1958	Granite, on granite base	This sculpture depicts a standing man holding a cup next to a post and symbolizes the work of scientists in fueling the United States' technological growth and development.	
The Laborer; Ahron Ben-Shmuel		1958	Granite, on granite base	This sculpture depicts a standing man wearing gloves and a helmet, symbolizing the contributions of working people in helping to build the United States.	
Titles Unknown: Eye and Hand; J. Wallace Kelly		1959	Limestone, on granite base	These two sculptures are reliefs, depicting an eye and a hand in abstract, that mark the entrances to the north terrace.	

=== Related sculptures ===
Name sculptor	Image	Year(s)	Material	Notes	Reference
Social Consciousness; Jacob Epstein		1954; installed 1955; relocated 2019	Bronze, on granite base	This sculpture is organized into three statuary groups. To the viewers' left is a standing woman, an allegorical depiction of Compassion, reaching down to assist a sick young man at her feet. In the middle is the Eternal Mother, kneeling with outstretched arms. To the right, Succor (or Death) is standing and holding a young man from behind. The work had originally been commissioned for the north terrace, but the committee determined that it was too large to be placed in the same area as The Spirit of Enterprise, the terrace's other major bronze work. It was instead installed outside the entrance of the Philadelphia Museum of Art, where it remained until 2019, when it was relocated to the campus of the University of Pennsylvania, near the Van Pelt Library.	
Stone Age in America; John J. Boyle		1887; installed 1888; relocated 1985	Bronze, on granite base	This sculpture, depicting a standing Native American woman with two children, one in her arms and another by her feet, was commissioned by the Fairmount Park Art Association in the 1880s. It was originally installed near the Sweetbriar mansion, but was relocated in 1985 to its current location just south of the memorial as part of a conscientious effort to place it near other works symbolizing American history.	
Thorfinn Karlsefni; Einar Jónsson		1918; installed 1920; removed 2018	Bronze, on granite base	This sculpture, depicting Icelandic explorer Thorfinn Karlsefni, was commissioned by Samuel's widow as part of his plans for the memorial to consist of a series of statues of famous historical figures along the bank of the Schuylkill River. The statue was thrown down and damaged by vandals in 2018 and, as of 2023, is in storage.	

== Analysis ==
Concerning the overall style of the memorial, Penny Balkin Bach, the executive director of the Fairmount Park Art Association, stated in a 1992 book that "[t]he Samuel Memorial is emblematic of that period of turmoil and transition when artists and patrons were in search of new forms and meanings in an increasingly volatile world". In a 1976 publication, the art association stated that the memorial "[represents] a wide variety of artistic expression", with an overall style typical of that "used in Federal projects in the 1930s".

=== Critical reception ===
Among art critics, the memorial has received mostly mixed to negative reviews. Dorothy Grafly, daughter of sculptor Charles Grafly, was highly critical of the memorial, calling the relationship between the architecture and sculpture flawed and saying, "[the memorial] may claim the doubtful honor of having perpetrated one of America's leading contemporary art atrocities". In a 1974 book, Ingersoll gave a mixed review of the memorial, saying, "[c]ertain of the pieces are true masterpieces, and there are few mediocrities", though he criticized the memorial's selection of artists for the south terrace, calling their works "markedly static and serious, perhaps too serious, lacking any romantic touch". In a 1976 book, Bendiner said Cret's overall design for the memorial was "mentally sound" and something that "could have been lovely", but called the overall choice of sculpture "a most irritating collection of uninteresting examples of the work of outstanding men and women, most of whom have done much better elsewhere". In a 1992 book, Bach stated that by the time the memorial was dedicated it was "as much a monument to the confusion about what constituted modern public art as a tribute to Mrs. Samuel's unprecedented generosity". Bach stated that the site's overall architectural design limited the sculptors' ability to create pieces for the memorial and called the overall choice of sculpture "unsettling". However, she also praised The Spirit of Enterprise, calling it the "most powerful and successful work" in the memorial.

=== Criticism of historical accuracy ===
According to the aPA, the memorial presents "a narrow view of the history of America as it lacks an authentic Indigenous perspective; presents an enslaved Black person in shackles, and highlights primarily white European immigrants". Susan Myers, a member of the aPA and project manager of the Steel Bodies exhibit, stated regarding the memorial, "As any kind of memorial that’s talking about the emblematic history of America, it’s complicated. It’s from one perspective usually. That can lead to some representation issues". A 2023 article from cultural critic Rosa Cartagena in The Philadelphia Inquirer stated that the memorial did not accurately reflect the role of "Black Americans, people of color, and women" in American history, while cultural critic Peter Crimmins of WHYY.org referred to the memorial as "problematic", calling particular attention to how The Slave is the only statue in the garden that depicts an African person and how Settling the Seaboard "suggests a false complicity from Indigenous people regarding the westward expansion of the new American nation". A 2023 article on PhillyVoice.com also highlighted the lack of diversity among both the sculpture subjects and sculptors, noting that Hassinger was the only black artist to have their work exhibited at the site.

== Sources ==
- "Samuel Memorial". The Art Digest. XIV (11). New York City: 7. March 1, 1940a.
- "Sardeau's "Slave"". The Art Digest. XIV (19). New York City: 6. August 1, 1940b.
- "A New Memorial for Philadelphia". The Art News. XXXI (29). New York City: 9. April 15, 1933.
- "Philadelphia: The Samuel Memorial". The Art News. XXXVII (7). New York City: 18. November 12, 1938.
- Bach, Penny Balkin (1992). Public Art in Philadelphia. Design by Katz Design Group. Philadelphia: Temple University Press. ISBN 978-0-87722-822-6.
- Bendiner, Alfred (1976). Bendiner's Philadelphia. Preface by Robert Bendiner. Philadelphia: Franklin Publishing Company. ISBN 978-0-87133-069-7.
- Cartagena, Rosa (June 23, 2023). "Massive metal sculptures transform an old memorial on the Schuylkill". The Philadelphia Inquirer. Archived from the original on October 15, 2023.
- Crimmins, Peter (June 20, 2023). "Contemporary art 'reanimates' historic sculpture garden on the Schuylkill River". WHYY.org. Archived from the original on December 4, 2023.
- Crimmins, Peter (February 6, 2024). "Historical Society spotlights a century of Philly public art by women". WHYY.org. Archived from the original on February 7, 2024.
- Thirty-eighth Annual Report of the Board of Trustees. Proceedings of the Thirty-eighth Annual Meeting, and the List of Members. Fairmount Park Art Association. Philadelphia. 1910.
- Fairmount Park Art Association: An Account of its Origin and Activities from its Foundation in 1871. Philadelphia: Fairmount Park Art Association. 1922.
- Philadelphia's Treasures in Bronze and Stone. Fairmount Park Art Association. New York City: Walker Publishing Company. 1976. ISBN 978-0-8027-7100-1.
- Grafly, Dorothy (February 15, 1950). Boswell, Peyton Jr. (ed.). "Samuel Memorial". The Art Digest. 24 (10). Reprinted from Art in Focus. New York City: 8, 23.
- Hunt, Kristin (June 16, 2023). "What are the new sculptures along Kelly Drive? They're a contemporary art display here through the fall". PhillyVoice.com. Archived from the original on September 24, 2023.
- Ingersoll, R. Sturgis (1974). "The Ellen Phillips Samuel Memorial". Sculpture of a City: Philadelphia's Treasures in Bronze and Stone. Fairmount Park Art Association; Photographs by Tana Hoban and Edward Gallob. New York City: Walker Publishing Company. pp. 250–257. ISBN 978-0-8027-0459-7.
- James-Gadzinski, Susan; Cunningham, Mary Mullen (1997). Mott, Jacolyn A.; Bantel, Linda (eds.). American Sculpture in the Museum of American Art of the Pennsylvania Academy of the Fine Arts. Contributors: Theresa Z. Esperdy, Michael W. Panhorst, Judith E. Stein, Sylvia Yount. Seattle: University of Washington Press. ISBN 978-0-295-97692-1.
- Klein, Esther M. (1974). Fairmount Park: A History and a Guidebook: World's Largest Landscaped Municipal Park. Fairmount Park Commission. Bryn Mawr, Pennsylvania: Harcum Junior College Press.
- Marion, John Francis (1984). Walking Tours of Historic Philadelphia. Philadelphia: ISHI Publications. ISBN 978-0-89727-055-7.
