= Bendiner =

Bendiner is a surname. Notable people with the surname include:

- Alfred Bendiner (1899–1964), American architect and artist
- Elmer Bendiner (1916–2001), American writer and journalist
- Hans-Jörg Bendiner (born 1949), Swiss rower
- Robert Bendiner (1909–2009), American journalist, editor, and author
