= Mark Baum =

American painter (1903–1997)

- Born: January 2, 1903; Sanok, Poland
- Died: February 8, 1997 (aged 94); Cape Neddick, Maine
- Known for: Painter
- Style: Non-objective
- Movement: Primitive
- Spouse: Celia Frank

Mark Baum (1903–1997) was a Polish-born American painter known initially for his self-taught landscapes and cityscapes who later developed a unique non-objective painting style focused on a single, unique glyph he called "the element." Baum's early work had considerable success in New York in the late 1920s through the early 1940s, with a number of solo shows and museum placements at the Whitney Museum and the Frick, but following World War II, Baum withdrew from the New York art scene to Cape Neddick, Maine, where he lived and painted in relative obscurity from the mid-1950s until his death.

== Childhood ==
Mark Baum (Marek in the Polish, Munyok at home) was born January 2, 1903, in Sanok, a town that is now part of Poland, but at the time was part of the Austro-Hungarian Empire, near modern-day Ukraine. His parents divorced when he was a young child, a highly unusual event in his Conservative Jewish community. His mother, having few options in her native land, emigrated to the United States with Mark's older sister. Mark was left with his maternal grandparents who lived in Frysztak in the Carpathian Mountains. Mark had very little contact with his mother and father from that point on.

Eventually Mark moved with his family to the larger town of Rzeszów, and when Mark was of schooling age, he defied his grandfather and took the test to attend the German gymnasium. The test was held on Saturdays in order to discourage Jews from applying. He got in and attended the gymnasium as well as Hebrew school, and was multilingual from a young age, speaking Yiddish at home, Hebrew in the temple, Polish on the streets, and German at school.

== World War I and immigration to the United States ==
During World War I, Mark worked in the summers at his grandfather's farm outside of the city. Mark recalled that in the summer of 1917 a few Russian prisoners of war were assigned to the farm. They were Bolsheviks and through them, Mark received an entire political education. They escaped one morning in October, having heard of the coming revolution in Russia, but not before telling Mark, then 14 years old, goodbye.

At the end of the War, Mark decided to leave home and emigrate to the United States. He took trains to the end of German territory, arriving at the Danish border. At this point, having no passport, he was able to literally run through the check point and was sheltered by a family who was able to get him to Copenhagen. There, through family connections, he was able to obtain passage to New York City, where he arrived in late 1919.

== New York City and the turn toward art ==
In New York, he got a job in the garment district at a furrier's shop. He reunited with his mother, whom he found to be very materialistic and the two of them did not have much contact after that. In the early 1920s, Mark was on the subway one day going home from work, having just been paid his week's wages in cash, that he looked down at the money in his hand and asked himself: "Did I really just come all this way for this?" He sought out painting as more reflective of his humanity and spirit.

Baum briefly attended classes at the Academy of Design in 1924 or 1925, then in the summer of 1926 he studied at the Cape Cod School of Art in Provincetown, Massachusetts under Charles Hawthorne. From then on he painted on his own. He fell into a rhythm of working half the year as a furrier and painting the other half, in the off season.

== Artistic style and beginnings of success ==
From the beginning, Baum's artistic style was distinctive. He often worked in hatched marks, with flattened perspective, emphasizing the collapsing angles of buildings and landscapes instead of trying to provide lifelike spatial structure or perspective. Initially he worked in watercolors, and his first solo exhibition featured a selection of watercolor landscapes and took place at the Whitney Galleries in 1929, with a few works bought by prominent collector Julianna Force who donated them eventually to the Whitney Museum of American Art. The following year, Baum approached famed photographer and gallerist Alfred Stieglitz, who bought one of his watercolors. In the early 1930s, Baum switched to working in oil paint, and Marie and Averil Harriman became ardent supporters of his work, with another solo show at the Marie Harriman Gallery in 1931. He was also part of a group show at the Brooklyn Museum in 1932. Through these connections and shows Mark found a healthy collector base in the early 1930s.

During this period, and much to Baum's chagrin, his work was classified as "primitive," which was at the time a shorthand way of grouping it in with a nostalgic Americana (ironically given that he was Polish born) that stood in opposition to European modernism. Mark rejected the word primitive outright, but also for its implications, writing in a personal statement: "Again the terms 'naive' and 'primitive' appeared in the reviews. Naive I never was. But although I was not a primitive painter, I did stand in a certain relationship to painting. Indeed, every reviewer when describing my work was forced to present certain modifications to the term 'primitive'. And when Harriet and Sidney Janis, knowing my work, then at work on a book of primitive painters, came to see me, they, too, realized this and later stated in their book that I was too advanced for a primitive painter." He felt very influenced by modernist painters, among them Kandinsky, Klee, Picasso, Cézanne, and Mondrian, the latter two of whom he had a particular affinity. Mark had almost no art education before coming to the United States, and it was in New York's museums and contemporary art galleries that he educated himself.

== Personal life, the depression, and World War II ==
In 1935 Mark married Celia Frank, a woman from Schenectady, New York. Their son Paul was born the following year, and another son, William, was born in 1939. The Baums first lived in Sunnyside, Queens, and then on the Upper West Side of Manhattan. Mark became a WPA artist, which along with his job at the furrier, which he had maintained since the early 1920s, supported the family.

Mark and Celia were both active in the New York Communist party, and in 1936 Mark ran for New York State Senate on the Communist ticket. The couple had an active social life that was filled with bohemians from their political affiliations as well as artists, actors, and free thinkers.

During World War II, Baum had a two-person show at Perls Galleries, and then solo shows in 1947 at the St. Etienne Gallery and in 1948 at the Laurel Gallery. He also was part of an International exhibition organized by the State Department. Yet following the War a crisis of faith descended. He wrote: "The World War came, the W.P.A. came to an end. Years of uncertainty. The World War ended. Then news of the Holocaust. All members of my family murdered by the Nazis, all the playmates of my childhood, all my boyhood friends and schoolmates killed by the Nazis. All this and a number of other factors contributed to the awareness: an era has ended, we were living in a new different world. I could no longer paint as of old, and sank into a depression."

== Coal mines and aspirational staircase ==
Baum's long crisis in painting was caused by the news from the war, but also simultaneously within the New York art scene he experienced the collective rush toward Abstract Expressionism and rejected it. "Painting seemed worthless. Many factors produced this crisis, among them was Abstract expressionism which was at the forefront of American painting; and to which I was bitter and antagonistic, not to its originators but to the imposters who practiced this solely for their own reward. I watched them cling to it."

In the late 1940s to early 1950s, Baum spent about three years, off and on, living in Pennsylvania, painting at the company towns of an enormous anthracite coal operation. In 1953 Baum had a solo exhibition at the Harry Salpeter Gallery, with work drawn primarily from the Pennsylvania series. A year later Baum would appear in Life Magazine, as part of an article about artists finding life-work balance in New York.

About three or four years later, Baum was looking back at a 1948 work that had been included in the Salpeter show called Aspirational Staircase and had a revelation: "What a wonderful diagonal this staircase. It carries the eye upward from the bottom of the canvas to the top, and the steps of the staircase are units of the diagon and are functioning like a steady beat in music. The staircase, a physical object, becomes in painting an element, and--losing its physicality--becomes a diagonal upward movement; and further along becomes a generalized directional movement and ultimately becomes a formative element in a style of painting."

== Spirituality and "The Element" ==
Simultaneously with this revelation, in the mid-1950s Baum had begun to turn his attention more fully to his spiritual life. He found in this quest an antidote to the formalist emphasis of Abstract Expressionism as well as a reason for him to continue in an artistic practice at all. For this he returned to the notion of faith, drawing on his Jewish background, though in abstracted ways and through secular-subjects. As one author noted: "Baum seems to be growing closer to spirituality through the study of secular things, such as the staircases, traffic lights, plants, and light-bearing architecture.... Triads of subjects begin to appear in Baum's work." This study of the trinity references not only the three patriarchs of Judaism, but the three pillars of the Kabbalist Tree of Life, the Christian Holy Trinity, the three Trikaya practice of Buddhism.

What Baum was proposing by this turn toward spirituality in painting he saw as a continuum with man's past, writing later:

For centuries there existed a symbiotic relationship between religion and painting. This relationship came to an end with the rise of the age of reason. Though religion declined drastically, our spiritual needs survived. And now with the help of high technology we are exploring outer space and all of the universe. We are all the more aware of its vastness, its endlessness and its greatness. Our sense of awe is reawakened and our spiritual life rekindled. This form of spirituality is worth of being subject matter in painting.

At this point, Baum took a radical step in his painting: in 1958 he turned completely to the non-objective and began crafting a single glyph that he called "the element," which was based on his revelation about the staircase. He developed this glyph over a period of ten years, from 1958 to 1968, at which point he arrived at its final form. Lutz describes this transition: "a long 5-pronged shape, similar to a pine needle cluster... a wide curved element appears similar to the silhouette of a bird in flight... the final element, which almost has the appearance of a head in profile appears in 1967." From that time on, he would use the element, in varying combinations and colors, as the exclusive mark in his paintings' compositions. Lutz describes that, "When Baum starts using the element the micro and the macro converge in what can only be described as a type of cosmic order."

== Maine and non-objective work ==
This shift in his painting's orientation corresponded also to a move to Cape Neddick, Maine, where he painted in a converted barn and lived in an adjacent farmhouse. He wrote that, "There...I can live with greater intensity, absorbing the greenness of spring and the whiteness of winter, the fullness of summer and all the colors of autumn. Absorbing this richness of the life about me into myself, I can give the best of me to my painting."

The work in this non-objective period falls into three distinct periods: early development of the "element" or early non-objective (1959–1967); middle non-objective (from approximately 1968–1978), where the compositions of the element are in often jewel-like groupings against many different colored backgrounds spanning the spectrum from bright turquoises and pale lavenders to darker mauves and deep forest greens. The final body of work from the late 1970s until just before his death around 1995 when he was forced by his health to stop painting is considered the "late nonobjective." These works are on solid, mostly black backgrounds (some early works from this period are on dark green or brown), with no groupings of the elements, except in lines and waves. Baum used stencils for his elements, tracing out the element compositions in pencil and then hand painting each one.

All of his non-objective work reflects highly refined color relationships, with darker colors being "heavier" and often on the bottom of the canvases rising toward lighter, brighter colors and indicating a coming to faith or a sense of fruition. He was very influenced by Manet in this regard, citing a particular painting of Christ and angels at the Metropolitan Museum of Art that he had studied closely and found inspiration in Manet's "emphasis on color relationships."

During the more than 30 years that Baum lived full-time in Maine, he had very few public exhibitions. He had a solo show at the Bleecker Gallery in East Hampton, NY, in June 1962; a solo show at the Rose Fried Gallery, New York, in 1963; and a large exhibition of his non-objective works at the Ogunquit Gallery, in Ogunquit, Maine, in 1969, which did not find a particularly receptive audience. But his continued faith in his paintings, and the faith that they restored to him, provided an ongoing impetus to keep working. Baum also had an extensive garden and by this time many grandchildren who lived nearby. He also maintained a constant interest in science and technology, subscribing to numerous scholarly scientific journals. Baum also had a collection of early circuit boards, which were visually and philosophically important to his work.

In 1983 the Metropolitan Museum of Art purchased two early works that they felt were missing part of their collection. This fact was very gratifying to Baum and gave him hope that his work would eventually be recognized again by a larger audience.

Baum actively painted until the fall of 1996, and died on February 8, 1997, at his home in Cape Neddick, Maine.

== Recent developments ==
Since his death a number of museums have collected Baum's work including the Fogg Museum at Harvard; the Mead Gallery at Amherst, the Ogunquit Museum, the University of New England (where they were part of a "Selections" show in 2009); the Berkeley Art Museum; and the Bowdoin College Museum of Art. One of his works in the Metropolitan Museum was reproduced in book for children published by the museum, called Go In and Out the Window.

In 2016 a solo exhibition was held at Krowswork Gallery in Oakland, California, for which a catalogue was also produced.
