= Ferdinand Louis Schlemmer =

American painter

Fritz Schlemmer
- Fritz Schlemmer circa 1930
- Born: Ferdinand Louis Schlemmer; September 26, 1892; Crawfordsville, Indiana
- Died: 1947
- Known for: Painting

Ferdinand Louis Schlemmer (September 26, 1892 – 1947) was an American artist.

== Biography ==
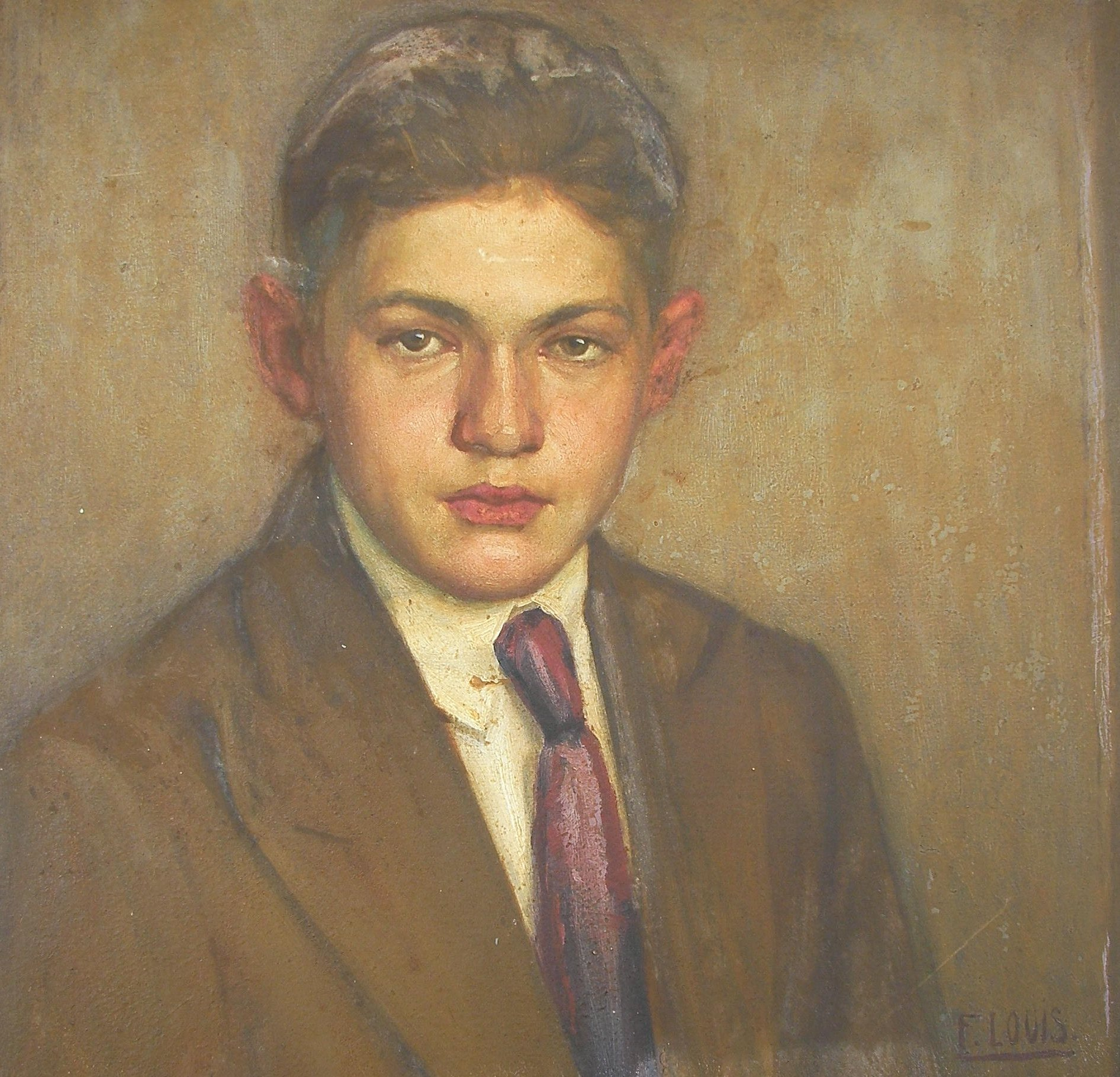
Portrait of his nephew, Philip Weidling, by Fritz Schlemmer

Ferdinand Louis "Fritz" Schlemmer was born and raised in Crawfordsville, Indiana, the son of Otto and Louise (Miller) Schlemmer. He enrolled in Wabash College but soon left to study art in Chicago. He was noted as an athletic swimmer and basketball player.

Along with Harold Heaton, Earl Russell, Fern Hobart Doubleday, he was extremely active for a couple of years in the "Paris Players" group traveling all over the United States to give performances for Chautauquas. While in Muskegon, Michigan the local Chronicle noted that their "Man Outside," was "screamingly funny," and the "most enjoyed program in this year's Chautauqua." Their group was embodied in the Redpath Chautauqua company.

In the Columbus (Georgia) Daily Enquirer, Monday May 29, 1916, Fritz Schlemmer was praised as a "master of lighting effects," as well as mentioning his painting talents adding to the "effectiveness of the production."

Schlemmer was listed as having been in the Indiana National Guard for five years when he registered for World War I on May 25, 1917 (World War I Draft Card) while in Madison County, Mississippi during his Chautauqua days. He was listed as being "tall, of medium build, had brown hair and dark brown eyes."

Both his World War I and World War II draft cards list his birth date as September 26, 1891, as does his birth certificate in Crawfordsville, Indiana.

Schlemmer was commissioned a first lieutenant with the 89th Infantry Division (United States) in 1917 and served as Divisional Camouflage Officer during the Meuse-Argonne Offensive in World War I.

After the war he studied in Paris and also spent winters in Florida where he did society portraits. During the summers he studied in Provincetown, Massachusetts, at the Cape Cod School of Art.

He returned to Crawfordsville in 1923 and opened a studio. In 1924 he married Beatrice Deane and they had one daughter, Beverly. He was appointed "Artist in Residence" at Wabash College in 1939. Schlemmer had 19 pieces accepted into the Hoosier Salon over a period of seven years.

He died on March 12, 1947, of Addison's disease.

== Gallery ==
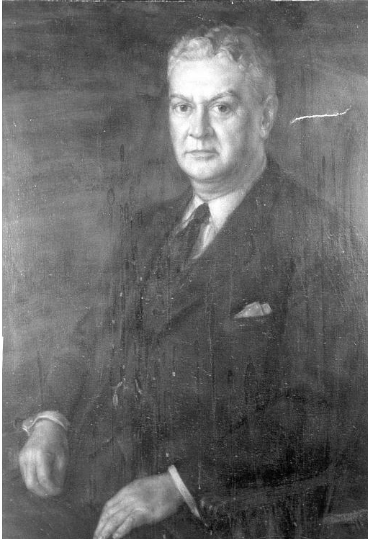
Portrait of John Jacob Coss by Ferdinand Louis Schlemmer

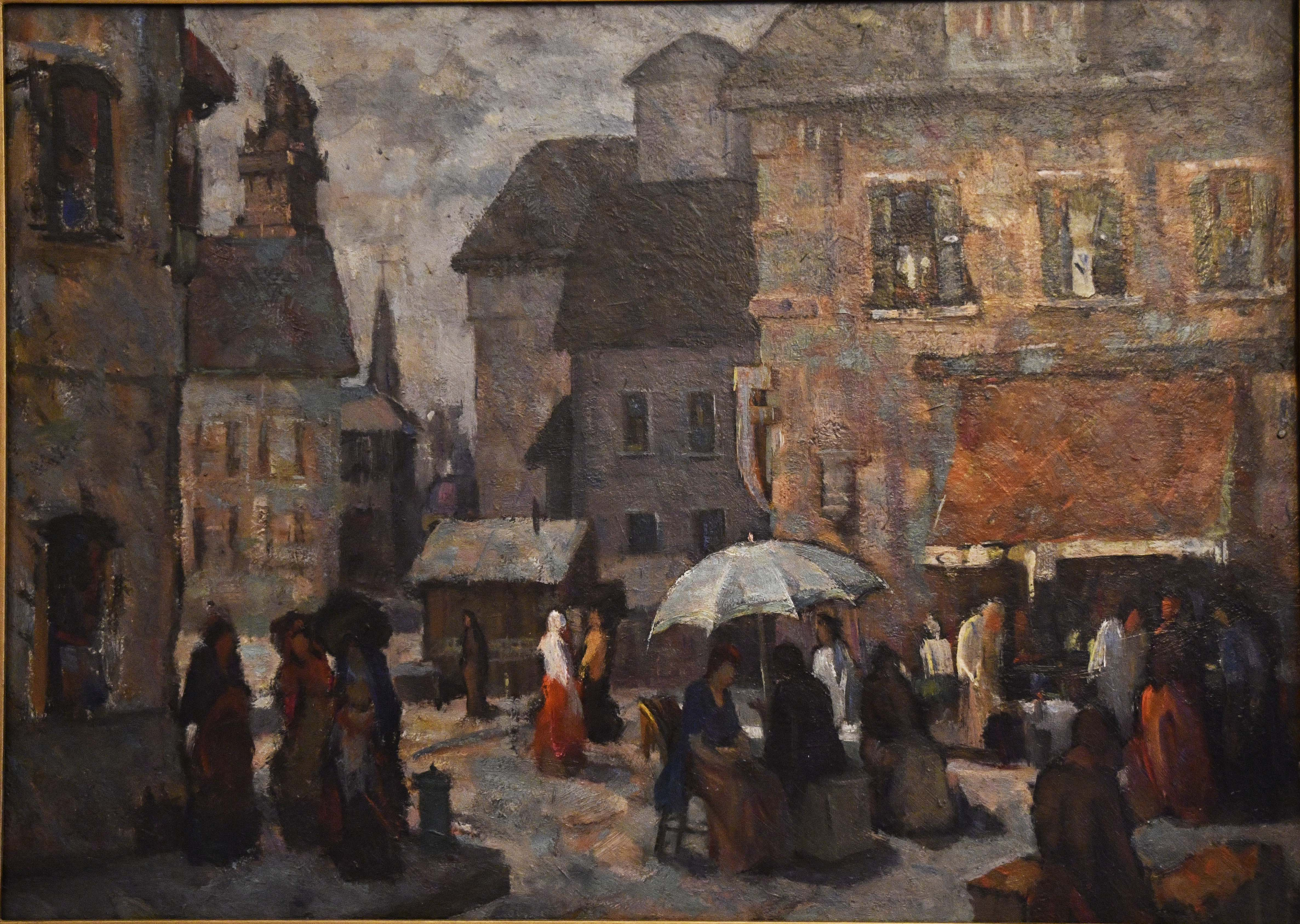
Paris Street Scene by Ferdnand Louis Schlemmer
