= Daniel Celentano =

American painter

- Daniel Celentano, Self Portrait
- Born: Daniel Ralph Celentano; December 21, 1902; Manhattan, New York
- Died: 1980

Daniel Celentano (1902–1980) was an American Scene artist who made realistic paintings of everyday life in New York, particularly within the Italian neighborhood of East Harlem where he lived, known as Italian Harlem. During the Great Depression he painted murals in the same style for the Section of Painting and Sculpture and the Federal Art Project.

== Art training ==
The son of Italian immigrants, Daniel Celentano was born into a large family within an Italian neighborhood of Manhattan. (Note: Celentano's grandson, Gregory M. Celentano, said that Celentano's birth name was Donato, later Anglicized to Daniel. One source says he was born in the Little Italy of Lower Manhattan. Others say he was born in the Italian neighborhood of East Harlem, known as Italian Harlem.) A childhood polio attack left him with only partial use of his right leg. Made homebound by this disability he was unable to attend school and, recognizing his artistic skill while he was still a boy, his parents were able to arrange for art teachers to tutor him at home. Through hard work and perseverance he regained control over his leg by the age of twelve and at that time became the first pupil of the social realist painter Thomas Hart Benton.

In 1918 he won scholarships that enabled him to attend Charles Hawthorne's Cape Cod School of Art in Provincetown, Massachusetts, New York School of Fine And Applied Art in Greenwich Village, and the National Academy of Design in New York's Upper East Side. The Cape Cod School taught students during the summer months and the other two gave classes during the rest of the year.

== Artistic career ==
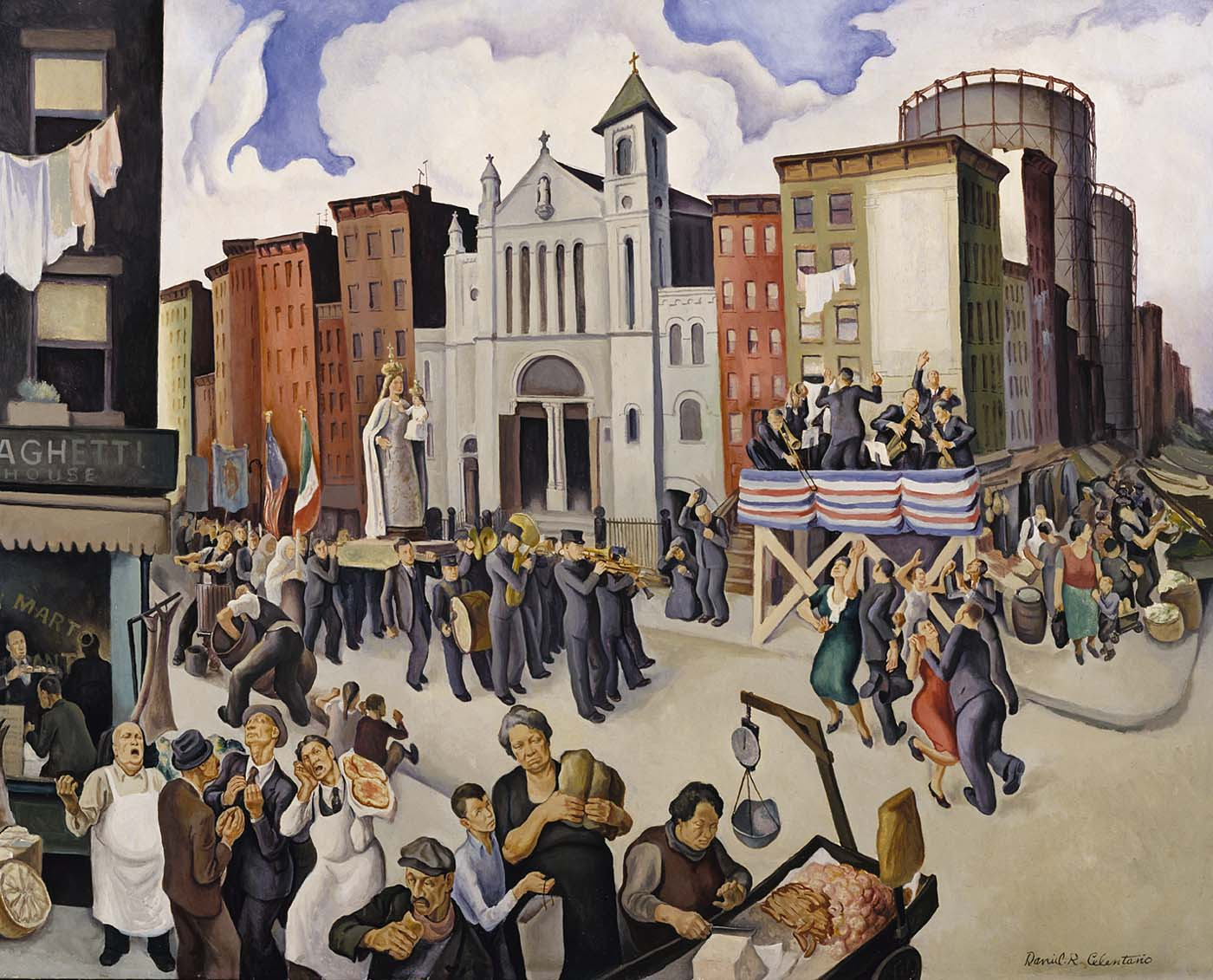
Daniel Celentano, Festival (1934) oil on canvas mounted on fiberboard, 48 1/8 in × 60 1/8 in (122 cm × 153 cm), created for the Public Works of Art Project. It was included in the exhibition 1934: A New Deal for Artists at the Smithsonian American Art Museum.

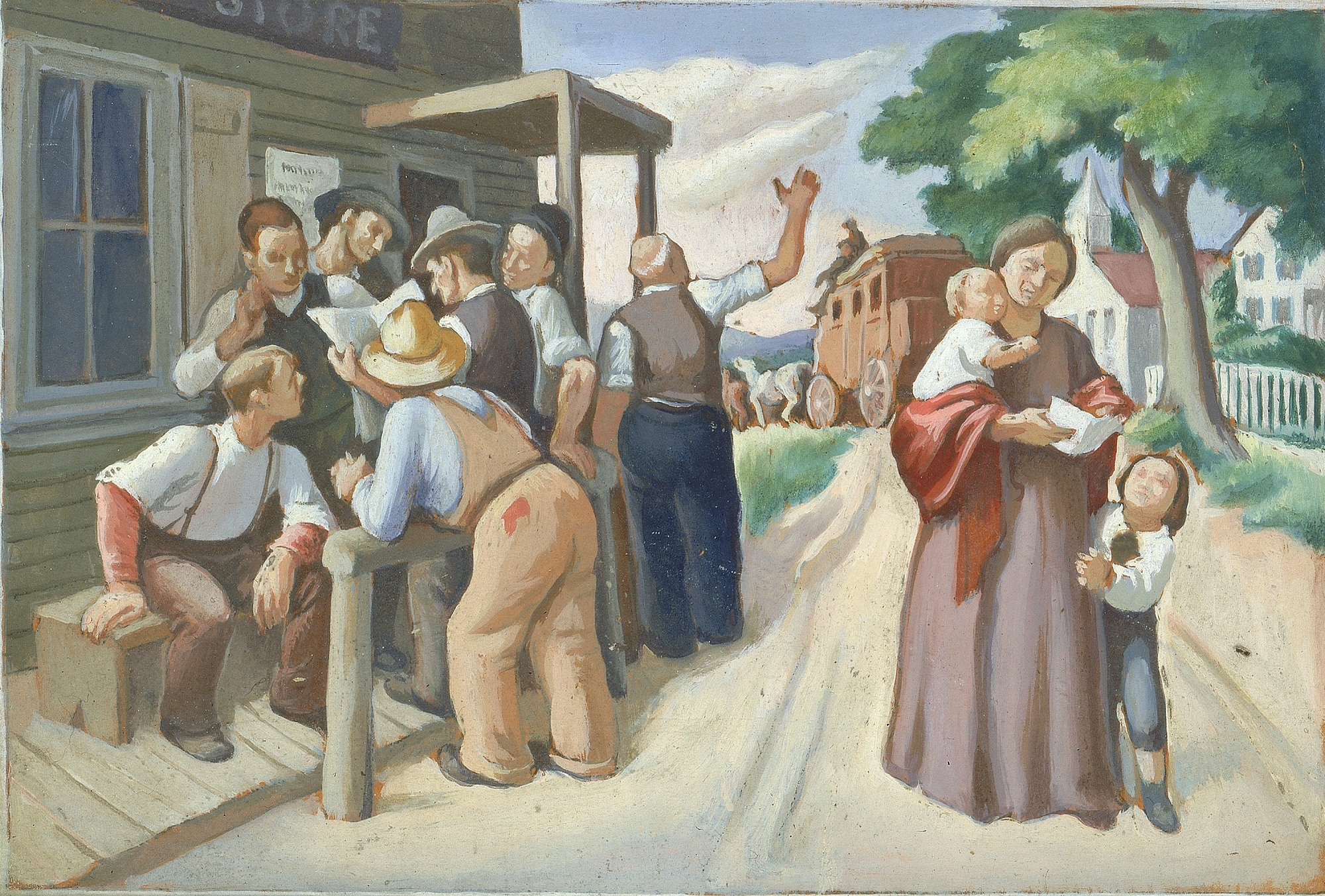
Study for Celentano's 1938 mural for the U.S. post office in Vidalia, Georgia

During the 1930s and until the outbreak of World War II Celentano participated in group shows at galleries in New York, Detroit, Philadelphia, and other American cities. His work was first shown to the public in an exhibition of works selected by Alfred Stieglitz that was held at the Opportunity Gallery in 1930. In his review of this show, the art critic for The New York Times, Edward Alden Jewell, included a painting of Celentano's called "Funeral" among ones that he especially recommended. (Note: The Opportunity Gallery was founded in 1927 by an artist and a small group of patrons. Located in the Art Center on East 56th Street in Manhattan, it offered free exhibition space to new artists and sought no profit from sales of their work. Each exhibition was selected by a different artist.) Celentano's drawing, "Supper Hour," is an early work that is typical in subject and treatment of much that he produced later in his career. It shows a family of eight in a kitchen getting ready to share an evening meal together. From their attitudes and actions it appears that they spend much of their home life in this one room. Although crowded together, they appear to be relaxed and self-assured. His painting, "Festival," of a few years later, shows the boisterous community of East Harlem in holiday mode. The Smithsonian's exhibition label says, "This painting fairly bursts with the raucous sounds, pungent smells, and vibrant characters of Manhattan's ethnic street life." (Note: In 2009, to celebrate the 75th anniversary of the Public Works of Art Project, the Smithsonian American Art Museum prepared a traveling exhibition of paintings from the museum's collection that were created for the program. Called "1934: A New Deal for Artists," it included works by a broad range of American artists produced between mid-December 1933 to June 1934.)

Between 1935 and 1939 Celentano exhibited regularly at the Walker Gallery. (Note: Located on East 57th Street in Manhattan, the Walker Art Gallery was founded by Maynard Walker in 1935. Specializing in the work of American regionalist painters, its stable of artists included Grant Wood, Thomas Hart Benton, and John Steuart Curry.) In 1939 his first, and apparently his only one-man show took place there. Of this show a critic for the New York Sun said "He paints the humble domestic life that he knows with a frankness as to its happenings, a sympathy and a tireless eye for detail that command respect, if not enthusiasm. The curious may learn all about that life from his paintings without going to the trouble of doing settlement work or running the slightest risk of getting out of their class." His shows at the Walker Gallery produced institutional sales to the Carnegie Institute, the Art Institute of Chicago, and the Whitney Museum.

Between 1935 and the outbreak of World War II Celentano participated in group exhibitions held in museums and public collections in New York and other major cities, including the Brooklyn Museum, the Corcoran Gallery of Art, the Art Institute of Chicago, the Detroit Institute of Arts, the Syracuse Museum of Fine Arts, the Pennsylvania Academy, the Whitney Museum, and the Golden Gate International Exposition.

From 1934 to 1941 Celentano was employed as a mural painter in New Deal art projects. For the Federal Art Project, he helped William C. Palmer paint murals for the new Queens General Hospital in Jamaica. In 1936 he painted a mural called Commerce for the Flushing branch of the Queens Borough Public Library. A critic for The New York Times pointed out this mural's "realistic illustrational" style noting that it depicted "rural fields and the Manhattan skyline, with crowds of dock loaders and businessmen flanking the central image of an artist (possibly Celentano himself) sitting at a drafting table, a worker among workers." In 1938, commissioned by the Treasury Department's Section of Painting and Sculpture, he created a mural titled The Country Store and Post Office for the post office in Vidalia, Georgia. He also made murals for two high schools, Andrew Jackson (1940) and St. Albans (1941), both in Queens. In 1940 he painted a large mural called Children in Constructive Recreation and Cultural Activity in Public School 150 (Long Island City, Queens). After the United States entered World War II he took a job in the art department of the Grumman Aircraft Corporation in Bethpage, Long Island, where he made a mural called The Flight of Man.

== Parents and immediate family ==
Both of his parents had been born in Italy: his father, Vito, about 1879, and his mother, Maria, about 1880. (Note: The name of Celentano's mother is variously given as Maria, Mary, Maria Covanni, Felicia Coivono, Felicia Cainavo, Maria Felicia, and Mary Cavana.) Celentano was the second of their eleven children who survived infancy. (Note: There were fifteen children in all. The names and approximate birth years of Celentano's surviving siblings were Anthony Celentano, 1899; Joseph Celentano, 1905; Angelina Celentano, 1907; Camella Celentano, 1909; Laurie Celentano, 1911; Rosco Celentano, 1913; Rose Celentano, 1916. Angela died in 1924 at the age of nineteen, just nine months after her marriage to a man named Louis Rafanelli. Anthony died in 1947 at the age of 49.) During the years when Celentano was studying art and for much of the rest of his life, he and his family lived on Pleasant Avenue in East Harlem. (Note: Pleasant Avenue runs for six-blocks between 114th and 120th Streets. Originally called Avenue A, it lies in line with that avenue, Sutton Place, and York Avenue beyond the west bend in the East River. The area was rural through much of the nineteenth century. By the 1890s Italian immigrants had pushed out most of the Irish and German families who had settled there in the mid-century years and a shifting border separated the Italians of East Harlem from the African Americans who dominated Central Harlem.) (Note: In 1939 Celentano told a reporter that he was born in East Harlem and there is some evidence that Vito and Maria Celentano and their family were living at the southern end of Pleasant Avenue at the time the New York Census was taken in 1915. They had moved to West 35th Street in Midtown Manhattan by the time of the 1920 U.S. Census, but by 1924 the parents had returned (or perhaps lived for the first time) in East Harlem. A public record of that time gives their address as an apartment on the northern end of the avenue at 433 Pleasant Avenue and there they remained there for most or all of the rest of their lives. When he married in 1928, Celentano was living in an apartment a little to the south on the same block and by the time the 1930 U.S. Census was taken, he, his wife, and his infant daughter, were living in an adjoining building in which other families named Celentano also had rented apartments.) He was schooled at home until, as a teenager, he overcame the atrophy of his right leg. In 1928 he married Marie Steneck. (Note: There is some confusion about the name of Celentano's wife. New York marriage records list her as Marie L. Sturck and the 1930 U.S. Census gives the name as Starck. Accounts of marriages in local newspapers list her as Marie L. Steneck. It is likely these were all misspellings of the same name. However, the U.S. Census for 1930 gives Celentano's wife's name as Ida Celantano while the 1940 Census gives Marie Celentano. There is little evidence that Ida and Marie Celantano were the same person. Their ages match, but Ida was listed as having been born in New Jersey and Marie in New York and Ida's parents were shown to be from Italy while Marie's were from New Jersey and New York.) In 1930, Celentano's wife gave birth to a daughter. (Note: As with his wife, there is uncertainty about Celentano's daughter (or daughters). The 1930 U.S. Census lists his only child as a daughter named Lucy, born that year. The 1940 U.S. Census lists a daughter named Dana who was nine at the time the census was taken.)

Celentano married a second time to Margaret Mary Dwyer on June 24, 1945, in Astoria, Queens. Their son Daniel Michael Celentano was born in November 1946. Celentano and his wife eventually moved to St. James, Long Island, where he died of cancer in 1980.

=== Other names ===
Celentano was known as Daniel R. Celentano and Daniel Ralph Celentano as well as Daniel Celentano.
