= Arthur Hartmann =

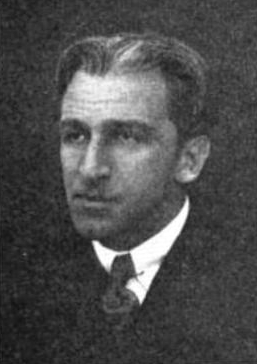

Background information
- Born: July 23, 1881; Philadelphia, Pennsylvania
- Died: March 30, 1956 (aged 74) New York, New York
- Genres: Classical
- Occupations: Violinist, composer, teacher
- Instruments: Violin, viola
- Years active: 1895–1956

Arthur Martinus Hartmann (né Arthur Hartman; July 23, 1881 – March 30, 1956) was an American violinist, composer and friend of Claude Debussy.

Hartmann was the son of Sigmund Hartman and Pepi Schweiger, who had immigrated from Hungary in December 1879. His father discovered his musical talents early on, and from the age of 6 Arthur studied with the Dutch-born violinist and composer Martinus van Gelder (1854–1941). Later, Hartmann would adopt "Martinus" as a middle name in his teacher's honor.

He was uncle to writer/artist Alfred Bendiner (1899–1964)

He was the author of Claude Debussy as I Knew Him and Other Writings of Arthur Hartmann.

Hartmann was born in Philadelphia, and died in New York City's St. Vincent Hospital after a stroke.

== Sources ==
- The Arthur Hartmann Project: Thumbnail Biography
