= Gilbert Franklin =

American sculptor

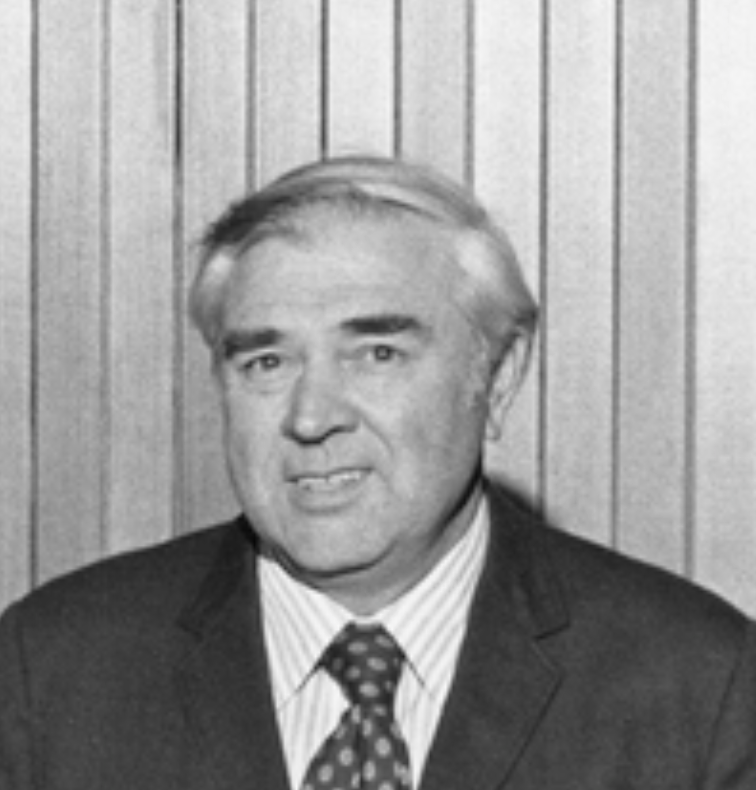
- Franklin (c. 1974)
- Born: Gilbert Alfred Franklin; June 6, 1919; Birmingham, England
- Died: October 19, 2004 (aged 85); Wellfleet, Massachusetts, U.S.
- Other name: Gil Franklin
- Education: Rhode Island School of Design; Cape Cod School of Art; Museo Nacional de Arte; American Academy in Rome
- Occupations: Dean of college, sculptor, educator
- Known for: Sculpture, public art
- Spouse: Joyce Gertrude Swirsky
- Children: 1

Gilbert Alfred Franklin (1919–2004) was an English-born American sculptor and educator. He was active in Providence, Rhode Island and Wellfleet, Massachusetts; and was best known for his public art sculptures.

== Early life and education ==
Gilbert Franklin was born on June 6, 1919, in Birmingham, England, and raised in Attleboro, Massachusetts. His father was a jeweler.

Franklin's earliest coursework was at the Hawthorne School of Art (now the Cape Cod School of Art), studying under John Robinson Frazier. He attended Rhode Island School of Design (RISD), graduating with a BFA degree in 1941; as well as completing studies at the Museo Nacional de Arte (in 1942) in Mexico City; and the American Academy in Rome (in 1949). He had been a student of Waldemar Raemisch, and John Howard Benson.

Franklin was married to Joyce Gertrude (née Swirsky) and together they had one daughter, art historian Nina Franklin Berson.

== Career ==
Franklin served on the fine arts faculty at RISD between 1942 and 1985. Two of his bronze works are prominent on the RISD campus, Orpheus Ascending (1963) and Daybreak (1968) the latter found on the "RISD beach". He had been honored as the H.M. Danforth Distinguished Professor of Fine Arts; and served as a Dean of the fine arts department at RISD. Additionally he taught at San Jose State University, University of Pennsylvania, Yale University, and Harvard University.

After his former professor Raemisch's death in 1955, Franklin completed Raemisch's 19 figure sculpture commission for public art in Philadelphia.

In 1948, he was awarded the Rome Prize fellowship. In 1959, he won the grand prize at the Boston Arts Festival for his work, Beach Figure. Franklin was awarded the honorary title of National Academician (1991).

Franklin died at the age of 85 on October 19, 2004, in his home in Wellfleet, Massachusetts.

Gilbert Franklin's work

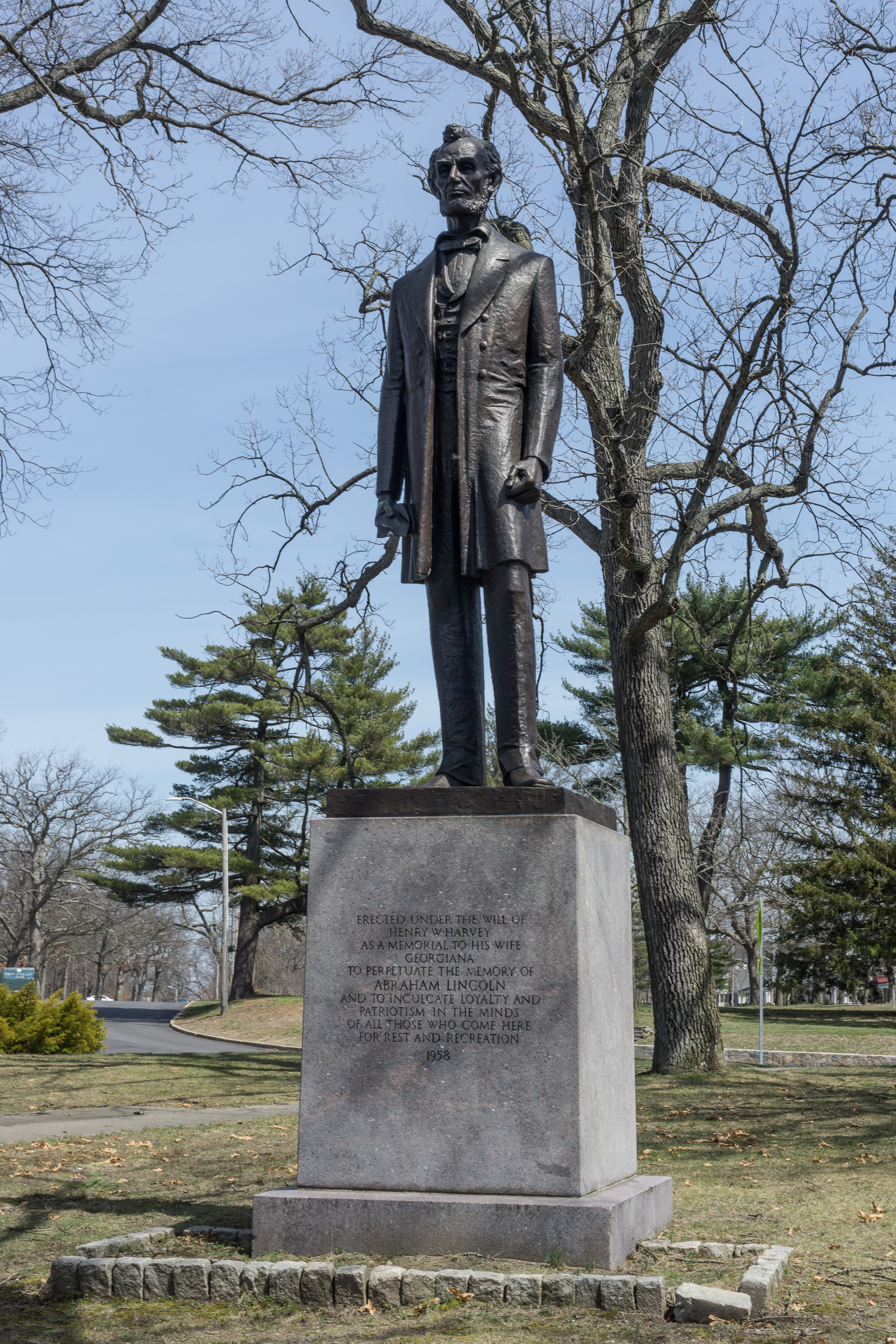
Abraham Lincoln (1954)

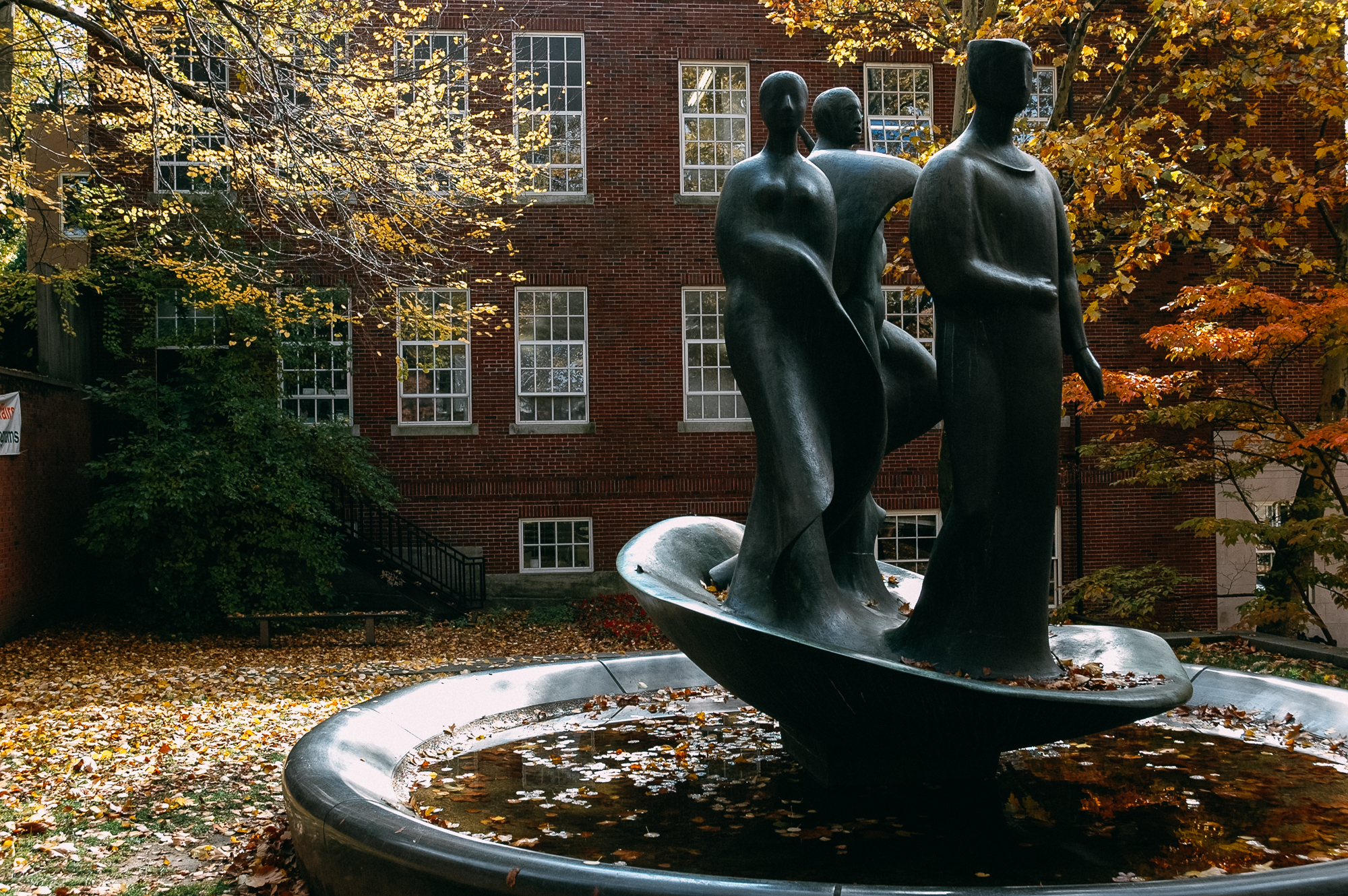
Orpheus Ascending (1963)

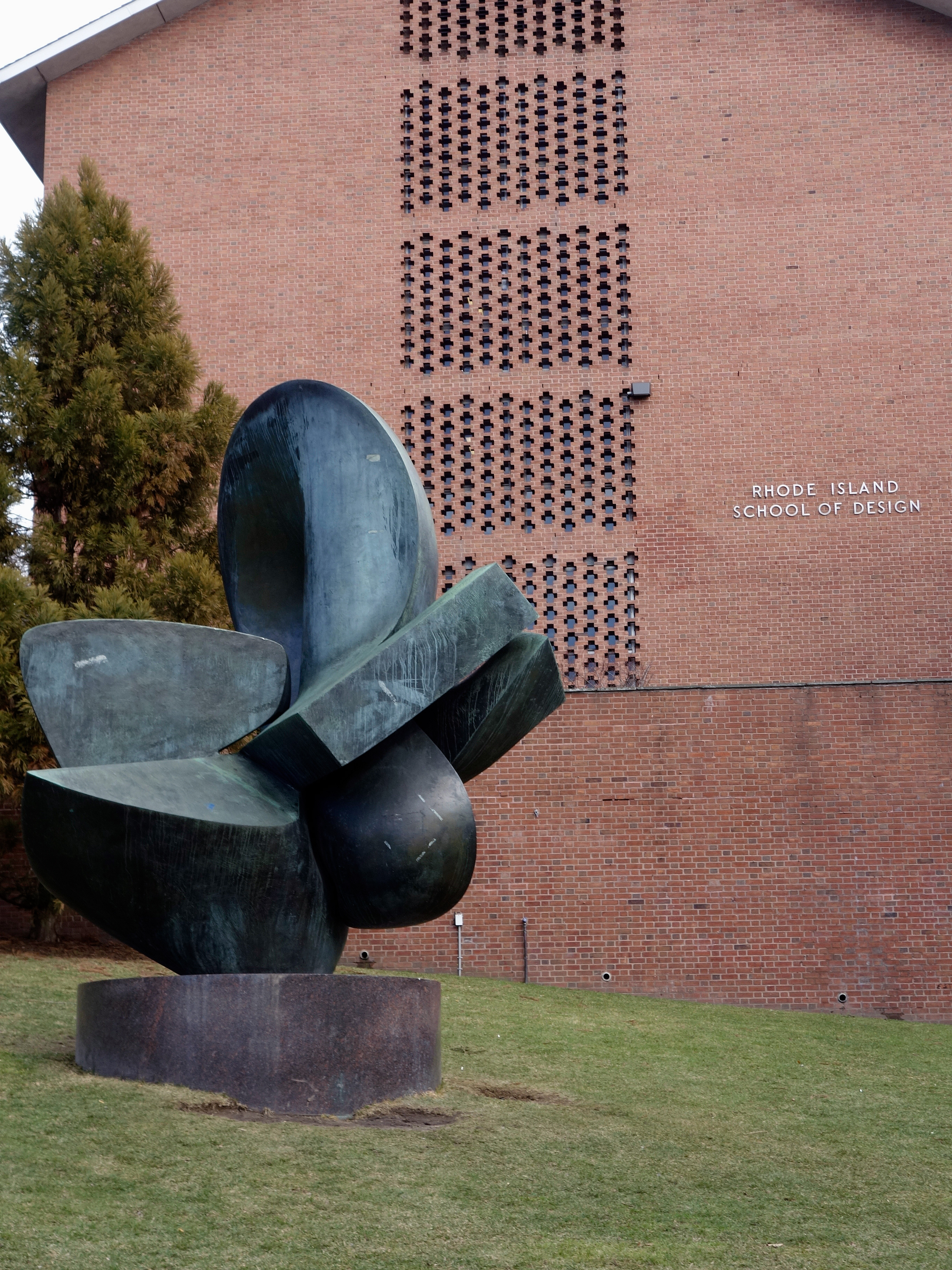
Daybreak (1968)

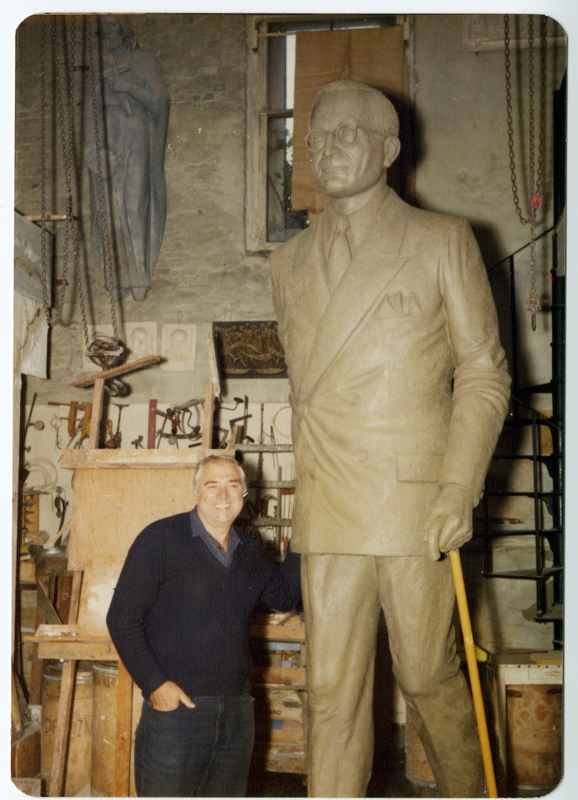
with Truman statue (c. 1975)

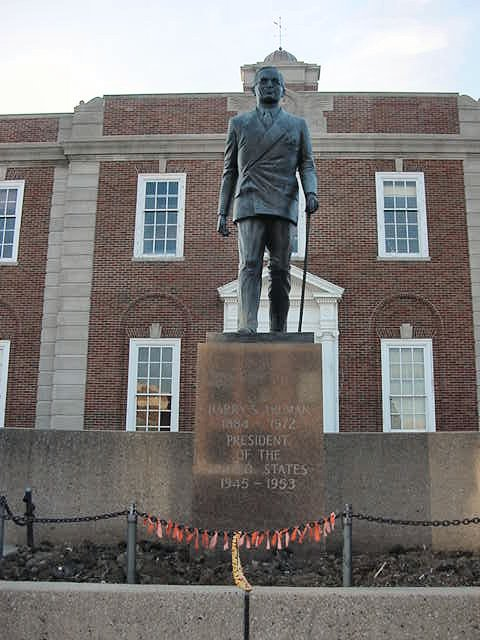
Harry S. Truman statue (1991)

== Public works ==
- Abraham Lincoln statue (1954), Roger Williams Park, Providence, Rhode Island; gift of the Henry W. Harvey Trust
- Orpheus Ascending (1963), Frazier Terrace, Rhode Island School of Design campus, Providence, Rhode Island
- Daybreak (1968), Rhode Island School of Design campus, Providence, Rhode Island
- Harry S. Truman statue (1976), Independence Square, Independence, Missouri
- U.S. Navy Memorial bas-relief (1991), U.S. Navy Memorial, Washington, DC
- Seaforms (1993), Wellfleet Public Library, Wellfleet, Massachusetts

== Exhibitions ==
- 1993, Celebrating Long Point, group exhibition, Noel Fine Arts, Bronxville, New York
- 2004, solo, Picture Gallery, Cornish, New Hampshire
- 2016, The Bridge at the End of the Road, solo exhibition, John Spoor Broome Library Gallery, CSU Channel Islands (CI)
