= Marie Løkke =

Norwegian artist (1877–1948)

Marie Løkke also Marie Loekke, Marie Mathiesen (January 9, 1877 - February 29, 1948) was a Norwegian artist. She is most associated with her impressionist landscapes in oil.

== Biography ==
Marie Løkke was born in Christiana, now Oslo, Norway. She was the daughter of Charles Victor Fritjof Løkke and Helga Sell. In 1903, she married Finn Mathiesen. She studied at the Norwegian National Academy of Craft and Art Industry and was a student of Harriet Backer for a few months. In 1898, she was awarded the Helmstierne-Rosencrones Endowment. From 1900 to 1901, he studied art at Dresden, Germany. She came to the United States in 1902 where she studied with Charles W. Hawthorne at his Cape Cod School of Art in Provincetown, MA. She divided her artistic career between the United States and Europe throughout her life.

She exhibited principally in Chicago, Illinois, winning prizes on several occasions. Her work was featured at both the Art Institute of Chicago and at the Chicago Norske Klub. She returned to painting in Norway (1917–1919). She painted in France and Belgium (1919–1922). From 1921 to 1922 she was a student at the National Academy of Fine Arts in Kristiania. She painted in Norway (1922–1926).

Her work were exhibited at both the 1915 Panama-Pacific International Exposition in San Francisco, CA and at the Norse-American Centennial Art Exhibit at the Minnesota State Fair in Minneapolis, MN in 1925. She also exhibited in Brussels and Ghent around 1920–1921 as the Autumn Exhibition (1898–1901, 1917) in Kristiania. One of her pieces is on display in the McKinnon Gallery in LaGrange IL

Marie Lokke died in 1948 at Oslo, Norway.

== Other sources ==
- Nelson, Marion (1993) Norwegian-American Painting in the Context of the Immigrant Community and American Art (Northfield, MN: The Norwegian-American Historical Association)
- Haugan, Reidar Rye (1933) Prominent Artists and Exhibits of Their Work in Chicago (Chicago Norske Klub. Nordmanns-Forbundet, 24: 371—374, Volume 7)
