= Waldemar Raemisch =

German sculptor

- Born: 19 August 1888; Berlin, Germany
- Died: 14 April 1955 (aged 66); Rome, Italy
- Occupation: Sculptor
- Spouse: Gertrude Ruth Gallad (m. 1919–1955; death)

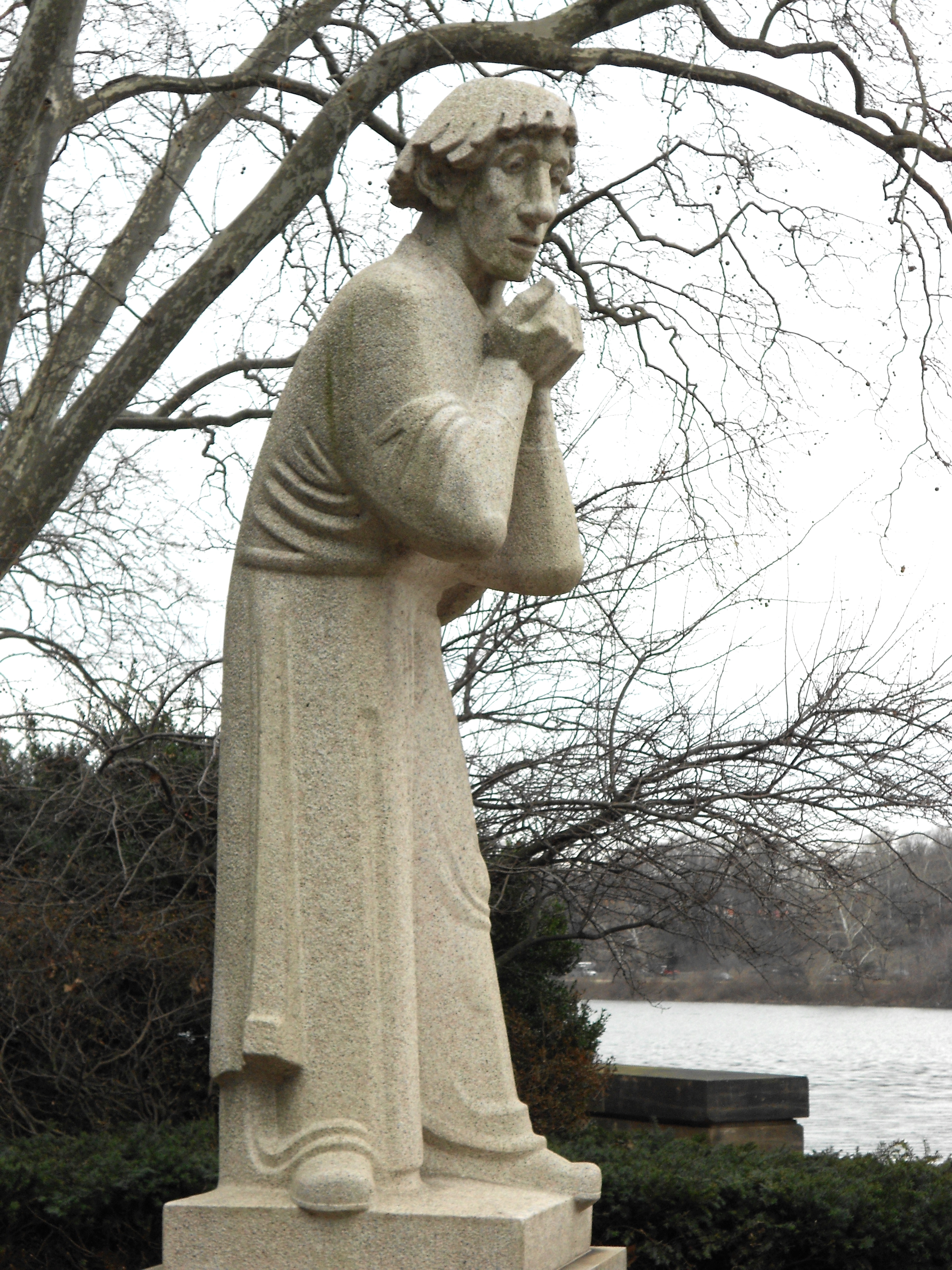
Sculpture of a Preacher (1952) by Waldemar Raemisch in Samuel Memorial, Fairmount Park, Philadelphia

Waldemar Raemisch (19 August 1888 – 14 April 1955) was a German-born American sculptor and educator.

== Biography ==
Waldemar Raemisch was born 19 August 1888 in Berlin, Germany. In 1919, he married metalsmith and enamelist, Gertrude Ruth (née Gallad). After marriage his wife went by the name Ruth Raemisch.

His work was part of the sculpture event in the art competition at the 1928 Summer Olympics. Prior to World War II, he taught at the United State Schools for Fine and Applied Arts in Berlin. In 1937, Raemisch was forced to leave Germany due to the rise in Nazi power, his wife was Jewish.

The same year, starting in 1937, Raemisch began to teach at Rhode Island School of Design (RISD). He later served as the head of the Sculpture Department at RISD from 1946 to 1954. Raemisch had many notable students including Peter Muller-Munk, Gilbert Franklin, Cornelius C. Richards, and Wolfgang Behl.

== Death and legacy ==
He had traveled to Rome in 1955, to complete a 19 figure sculpture that would be public art in Philadelphia. On 14 April 1955, he died at Salvator Mundi Hospital in Rome after an emergency surgery on his intestines.

After Raemisch's death, Raemisch's former student and a sculpture professor at RISD, Gilbert A. Franklin (1919–2004) completed the 19 figure sculpture commission.

His work is included in the public museum collections including at the Smithsonian American Art Museum, Rhode Island School of Design Museum, Harvard Art Museums, Pennsylvania Academy of the Fine Arts, McNay Art Museum, Currier Museum of Art, among others.
