= Elmer Bendiner =

American writer (1916–2001)

- Born: February 11, 1916; Pittsburgh, Pennsylvania, U.S.
- Died: September 16, 2001 (aged 85)
- Education: City College of New York
- Occupations: Writer; journalist
- Spouse: Esther Shapiro (m. 1941)
- Parent(s): William Bendiner; Lillian Schwartz
- Relatives: Robert Bendiner (brother)

Elmer Bendiner (February 11, 1916 – September 16, 2001) was an American writer and journalist.

Bendiner was born in Pittsburgh to William Bendiner, a businessman, and Lillian (maiden name Schwartz). His brother was Robert Bendiner. Growing up Jewish in an Appalachian environment where the Ku Klux Klan was influential and "Jews, Catholics, and the very few blacks on the outskirts of town ... served as ritualistic enemies" helped shape him. He attended the City College of New York from 1932 to 1935, then met Esther Shapiro, an editorial assistant, while he was working for the Brooklyn Daily Eagle; they were married in 1941, shortly before the U.S. entered World War II. During the war, Bendiner served as a B-17 Flying Fortress navigator, in the 379th bomb group at station 117 Kimbolton England, receiving the Distinguished Flying Cross, the Air Medal with three oak leaf clusters, and the Purple Heart. He participated in the famous Schweinfurt-Regensburg mission and survived the ditching of his Fortress in the English Channel.

After the war, he worked for Esquire, then for a series of medical publications, and wrote a number of books. Among his better-known works are The Rise and Fall of Paradise (a history of al-Andalus), A Time for Angels: A Tragicomic History of the League of Nations, The Bowery Man, The Virgin Diplomats, Biographical Dictionary of Medicine (cowritten with his daughter Jessica), and The Fall of Fortresses. The Fall of Fortresses was included in The Library of America's anthology World War II Memoirs: The European Theater

== Sources ==
- New York Times death notice
