= Cape Cod School of Art =

Art school in Provincetown, Massachusetts

- Hawthorne Class Studio
- U.S. National Register of Historic Places
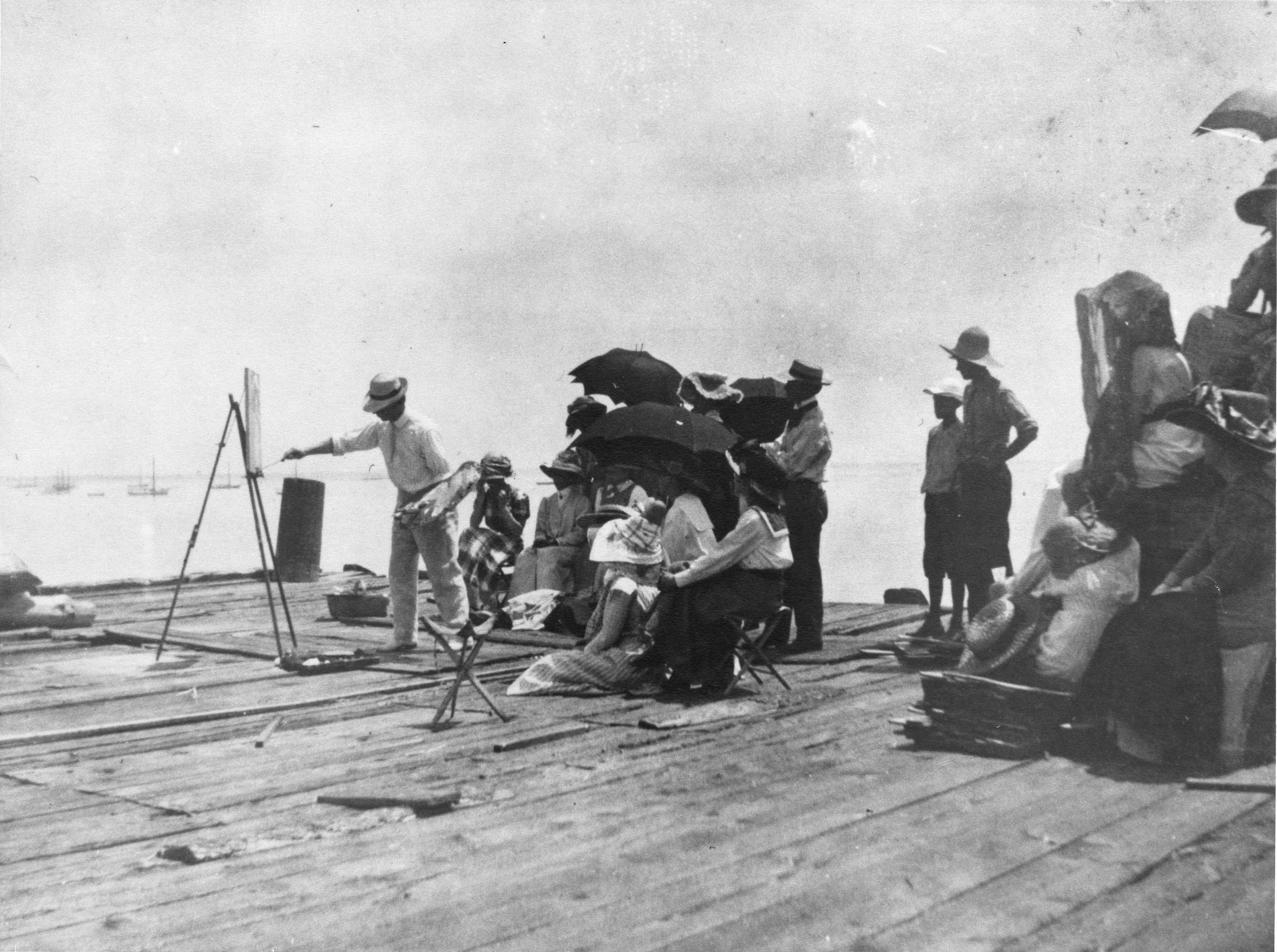
- Webster (left) teaches a class, 1910

- Location within Cape Cod Location within Massachusetts Location within the United States
- Location: Provincetown, Massachusetts
- Coordinates: 42°3′27″N 70°10′58″W
- Built: 1900
- NRHP reference No.: 78000434
- Added to NRHP: July 21, 1978

The Cape Cod School of Art, also known as Hawthorne School of Art, was the first outdoor school of figure painting in America; it was started by Charles Webster Hawthorne in Provincetown, Massachusetts, in 1898.

The Hawthorne Class Studio building off Miller Hill Road was listed on the National Register of Historic Places in 1978. The 1 1/2-story studio building is a large gambrel-roofed barn-like building, measuring about 50 by 80 feet (15 m × 24 m), set on concrete pillars and clad in wooden shingles. Its symmetrically arranged front has a center entry with narrow flanking windows, paired windows in bays on either side of the entrance, and single windows at the second level under the gable. The studio was constructed c. 1907 to house the teaching studio of artist Charles Hawthorne. Hawthorne began giving art classes in Provincetown in 1899, and was an acknowledged leader of the artistic community there at the time of his death in 1930.

== Notable students ==
- Daniel Celentano, Depression-era American Scene painter
- Oliver Newberry Chaffee, Modernist painter and printmaker
- Gilbert Franklin, sculptor, educator
- Lucy L'Engle, abstract artist of New York and Provincetown
- Dorothy Lake Gregory, artist and illustrator
- Inez Hogan, author and illustrator
- Henry Hensche, painter and teacher
- Ferdinand Louis Schlemmer, painter and teacher
- Andrew Winter, painter
- Marie Løkke, Norwegian artist
- William Johnson, American artist

== See also ==
- National Register of Historic Places listings in Barnstable County, Massachusetts
