= Sweetbriar =

Historic house in Pennsylvania, United States

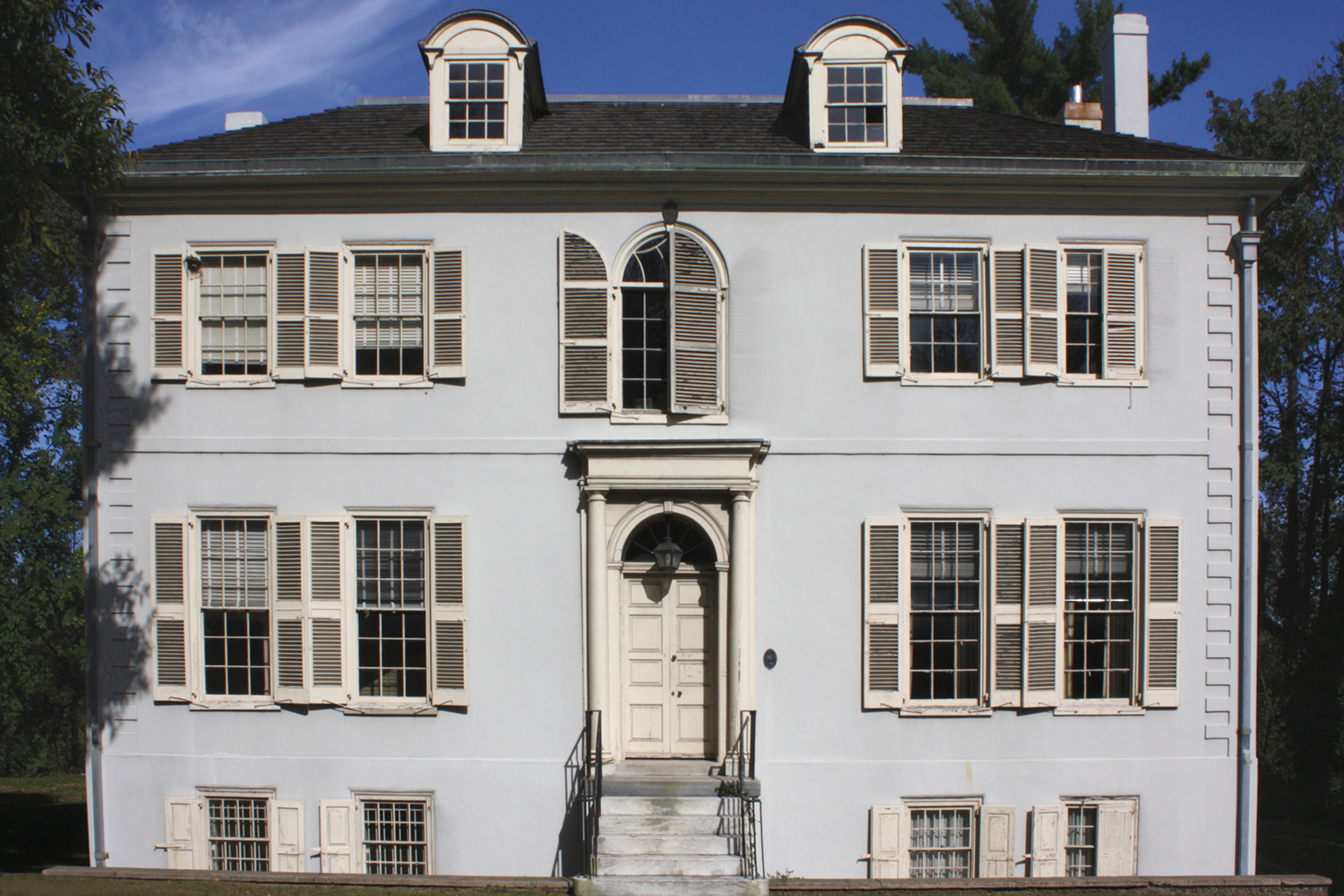
- Sweetbriar Mansion

- Location within Pennsylvania Location within the United States
- 39°58′37″N 75°12′03″W
- Location: West Fairmount Park, Philadelphia

History
- Built: 1797

Site notes
- Architectural style: Federal

Philadelphia Register of Historic Places

Sweetbriar is a Neoclassical mansion in the Federal style built in 1797 in West Fairmount Park, Philadelphia. The mansion was built by Samuel Breck and named for the roses that grew on the property. The interior includes a double parlor and floor-to-ceiling windows with sweeping views of the Schuylkill River. Period pieces include Chinese armorial porcelain, Hepplewhite and Sheraton style chairs, and Adam style furniture. Wedgwood jasperware and fireplaces with delicate plaster decorations were influenced by discoveries in the ancient houses of Pompeii. Bird prints by John James Audubon and paintings by William Birch decorate the walls.

The house was operated by the Modern Club of Philadelphia from 1939 to 2014. It has been closed while undergoing renovations as the city looks for a new organization to maintain it.

== See also ==
- List of houses in Fairmount Park
