= Robert Sturgis Ingersoll =

American art museum president (1891–1973)

Robert Sturgis Ingersoll, Sr.
- Born: December 16, 1891
- Died: September 12, 1973 (aged 81)
- Occupation: President of the Philadelphia Museum of Art

Robert Sturgis Ingersoll, Sr. (December 16, 1891 – September 12, 1973) was president of the Philadelphia Museum of Art from 1948 to 1964.

== Early life and family ==
Robert Sturgis Ingersoll was born December 16, 1891, in Philadelphia, Pennsylvania, a son of Charles Edward Ingersoll (1860-1932) and Henrietta Auchmuty (née Sturgis) Ingersoll (1864-1944). His father was a financier who was a Delegate to the Democratic National Convention in 1896 from Pennsylvania, and a candidate for United States Congress from Pennsylvania's 7th District in 1902.

His great-grandfather, Charles Jared Ingersoll, was a United States Congressman and United States Attorney from Pennsylvania. His 2nd great-grandfather, Jared Ingersoll, was also a United States Attorney from Pennsylvania, as well as Pennsylvania's Attorney General. Jared also ran as DeWitt Clinton's vice-presidential candidate in the 1812 United States presidential election. His 2nd great-uncle, Joseph Reed Ingersoll, was a United States Congressman from Pennsylvania and diplomat.

R.S. Ingersoll's 3rd great-grandfather was Benjamin Chew. His 7th great-grandfather was Thomas Hooker, founder of the Colony of Connecticut.

Ingersoll was named for his maternal grandfather, Robert Shaw Sturgis (1824-1876). His first cousin, Elizabeth Sturgis Potter, married Frank Polk, a United States lawyer and diplomat. Another first cousin was Robert Sturgis Potter (1890-1947), with whom he shared a name. Potter had a son, Robert Sturgis Potter, Jr. (1920-1988), whose daughter, Linda Sophia Potter, is married to Timothy Shriver, member of the Kennedy family.

His great-uncle was Joseph M. Warren, a United States Congressman from New York and one-time mayor of Troy, New York. His second cousin, twice removed is diplomat David McKean (diplomat), a United States Ambassador to Luxembourg under President Barack Obama from 2016 to 2017.

Ingersoll had five siblings: Anna Warren Ingersoll (1887-1980), who never married; Captain Harry Ingersoll (1890-1918), who was killed in action in France during World War I; Charles Jared Ingersoll (1894-1988), named after their ancestor; Susan Brimmer Ingersoll (1896-1987), who married Orville Horwitz Bullitt (1894-1979)- Orville's brother was diplomat William C. Bullitt; and John Hobart Warren Ingersoll (1899-1967). His nephew, Sergeant Charles Jared Ingersoll, Jr. (1923-1944), was killed in action in Italy during World War II.

== Career ==
Ingersoll graduated from Princeton University in 1915. He would serve as President of the Philadelphia Museum of Art from 1948 to 1964. During his time there, he also initiated a Board of Governors for the organization, serving as the board's chairman from 1947 to 1959.

Ingersoll was elected to the American Philosophical Society in 1950.

== Personal life ==
He married Marion Bernard Fowle (1893-1968) and had five children:

1. Robert Sturgis Ingersoll, Jr. (1915-1968); married Harriet Kingston Archer (1916-1995)
2. George Fowle Ingersoll (1916-1970); named after Marion's father
3. Phebe Warren Ingersoll Benson (1917-1994)
4. Charles Edward Ingersoll, II (1922-1982); named after Robert's father
5. Harry Ingersoll (1924-1982); named after Robert's late brother

Robert Ingersoll, Jr. had three children

1. Robert Sturgis Ingersoll, III (b. 1937), who married Vera Felicity Roosevelt (1939-2000), daughter of Henry Latrobe Roosevelt, Jr., granddaughter of Henry L. Roosevelt, and cousin of United States Presidents Franklin D. Roosevelt and Theodore Roosevelt. Robert and Vera had four children: Archer Sturgis, Julia Story, Eleanor Roosevelt and Isabelle Sturgis Ingersoll.
2. Joseph Reed Ingersoll (1940-2018); married Patricia Stockton Royce (1937-2010) and had two sons: Joseph Reed, Jr. and Richard Stockton Ingersoll.
3. Stephen Kingston Ingersoll (1943-1966)
