= Robert Bendiner =

American journalist (1909–2009)

- Born: December 15, 1909; Pittsburgh
- Died: February 7, 2009 (aged 99); Southampton, Pennsylvania
- Occupations: Journalist, editor, author
- Years active: 1930s – 2009
- Known for: Managing editor of The Nation
- Relatives: Elmer Bendiner (brother)

Robert Bendiner (December 15, 1909 – February 7, 2009) was an American journalist, editor, and author who served as managing editor of The Nation and as a member of the editorial board of the New York Times.

He also contributed to The New Republic, The Nation, The New Yorker, and Harper's.

== Career ==
Bendiner wrote for the Daily Worker in the 1930s.

He served as managing editor of The Nation magazine from 1937 to 1944. In 1942, he published a book expected to criticize the U.S. State Department. In 1943, he joined 250 liberals in supporting the continuation of the American Labor Party against a communist faction within.

He returned to The Nation as an associate editor from 1946 to 1950.

He wrote freelance from 1951 to 1968 and again from 1978 until his death. He was "associated" with the New York Times from 1969 to 1977.

He chaired the Wellesley Summer Institute Social Progress from 1946 to 1953. He was faculty at the Salzburg Seminary in American Studies in 1956 and visiting lecturer in journalism at Wesleyan University in 1983.

He died in February 2009.

== Awards ==
- Guggenheim fellow (1962–1963)

== Writings ==
=== Books ===
- The Riddle of the State Department (New York: Farrar & Rinehart, 1942)
- White House Fever (New York: Harcourt, Brace & Co., 1960)
- Obstacle Course on Capitol Hill (New York: McGraw-Hill, 1964)
- Just Around The Corner – A Highly Selective History Of The Thirties (New York: Dutton, 1967)
- The Strenuous Decade: A Social and Intellectual Record of the 1930s with Daniel Aaron (1970)
- The Politics of Schools – A Crisis in Self-Government (Joanna Cotler Books, 1970)
- The Fall of the Wild, the Rise of the Zoo (New York: E.P. Dutton, 1981)

=== Articles ===
Nation:

- "Wallace: The Incomplete Angler," (December 20, 1947)
- "Rout of the Bourbons" (July 24, 1948)
- "Politics and People: The Trial of Alger Hiss" (6/11/1949)
- "A Most Unusual Case": The Trial of Alger Hiss – III" (July 16, 1949
- "The Ordeal of Alger Hiss" (1950)
- "The Ordeal of Alger Hiss: II. Psychiatry, Law, and Politics" (2/11/1950)

New York Times:

- "Point Four – Still the Great Basic Hope" (Apr 1, 1951)
- "The Undramatic Man of Drama" (Mar 11, 1951)
- "To Stop Wasting Our Ex-Presidents" (Apr 27, 1952)
- "Portrait of the Perfect Candidate" (May 18, 1952)
- "Ghosts Behind The Speechmakers" (Aug 17, 1952)
- "Battle of Filibuster" (Sep 14, 1952)
- "How Much Has TV Changed Campaigning?" (Nov 2, 1952)
- "If TV Moved Into the Classroom" (Mar 8, 1953)
- "Current Quotations On Stockbrokers" (May 10, 1953)

Harper's:

- The man who reads corpses (February 1955)
- White House fever: Why candidates campaign (March 1960)

Saturday Review:

- "When Culture Came to Main Street" (April 1, 1967)

Reporter:

- "The Age of the Thinking Robot, and What It Will Mean to Us" (April 7, 1955)
- “Who Owns Outer Space?" (June 12, 1958)

American Heritage:

- "Two Cheers For Optimism" (December 1982)
- "The Law And Potter Stewart: An Interview With Justice Potter Stewart" (December 1983)
- "Explaining What You Are After Is The Secret Of Diplomacy" (August/September 1983)
- "What I Learned From The Pirates" (September/October 1989)
