= Alfred Bendiner =

American architect and artist

Alfred Bendiner (23 July 1899 – 19 March 1964) was an American architect and artist, perhaps best known for his caricatures and cartoons.

== Biography ==
He was born in Pittsburgh, Pennsylvania, the son of Hungarian immigrants Armin and Rachel Hartmann Bendiner. He was the second-oldest of five children, and raised in a cultured Orthodox Jewish household. The family moved to Philadelphia when he was a boy, where he attended public schools, and graduated from Northeast High School in 1917.

Bendiner won a scholarship to the Pennsylvania Museum School, but left after a year to enlist in the Students' Army Training Corps at the University of Pennsylvania. He was a sergeant and still stationed in Philadelphia when World War I ended in November 1918, but his service earned him automatic admission to Penn. He studied architecture there under Paul Philippe Cret, and graduated with a bachelor's degree in 1922.

=== Architect ===
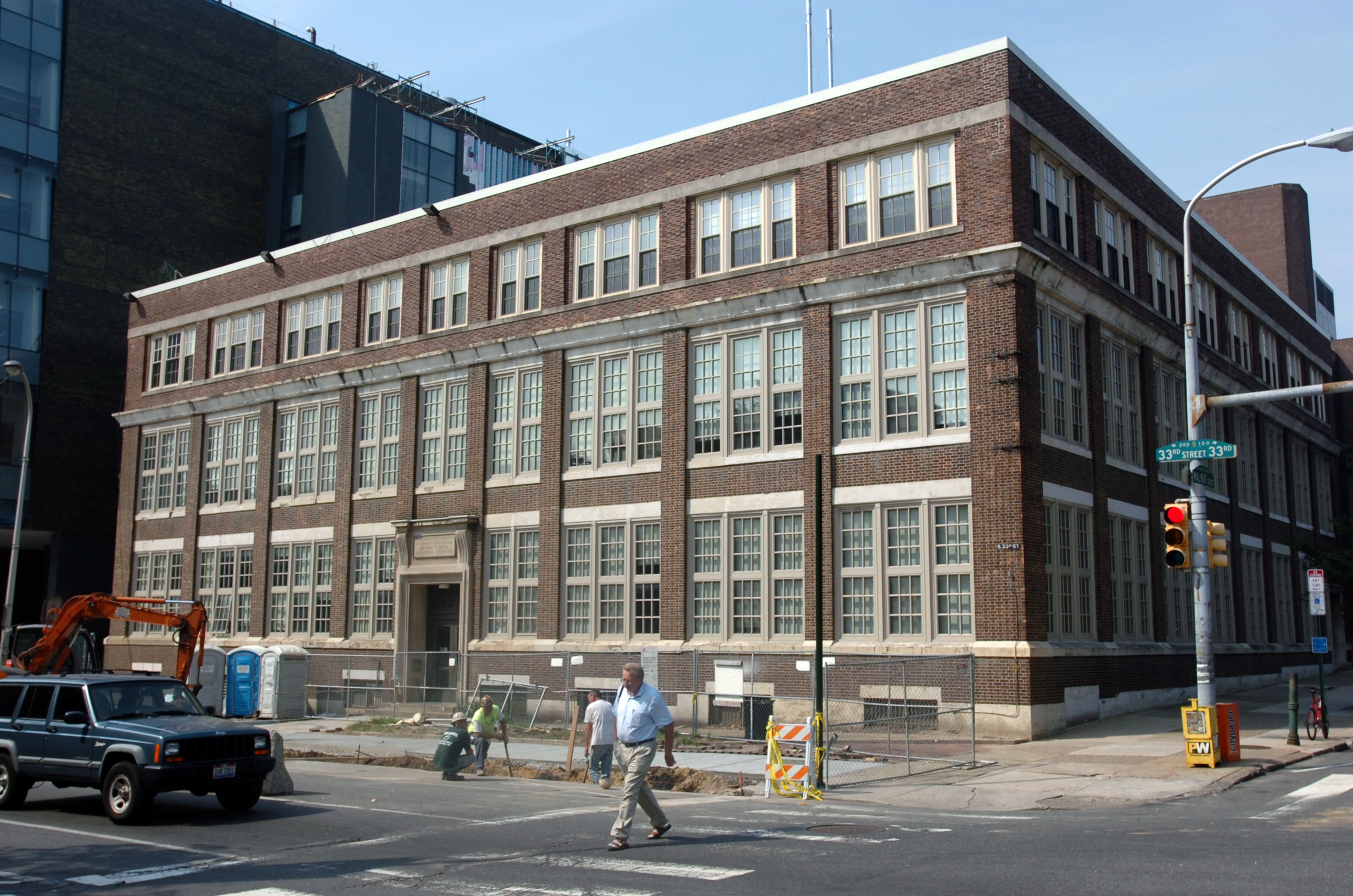
Moore School of Engineering Building, 33rd & Walnut Streets, Philadelphia

Following graduation, he was employed as a draftsman in the office of Stewardson & Page for a couple years, before being hired by Cret. Bendiner worked on major Cret projects such as the Detroit Institute of Arts (1927), the Hartford County Courthouse (1929), and the Folger Shakespeare Library (1932). He also did early work on three battle memorials for American military cemeteries in Europe: the Château-Thierry American Monument (1937) and the Somme American Cemetery and Memorial (1937), in France; and the Flanders Field American Cemetery and Memorial (1937), in Belgium.

While working as a Cret draftsman during the day, Bendiner completed a master's degree in architecture from Penn at night. Penn purchased a former piano factory at the southwest corner of 33rd & Walnut Streets to house the Moore School of Engineering. Cret's office designed alterations to the building, 1925–1926, with Bendiner as architect in charge. He took a year off to attend the American Academy in Rome, 1928–1929.

Bendiner left the Cret office in 1933, and opened his own architectural office in Philadelphia, which remained in operation until his retirement in 1961. Finding clients was a challenge during the Great Depression, and commissions were few and far between. Most of his completed designs during this period were alterations to houses and commercial buildings, and the third story addition to the Moore School (1940).

=== Archaeological draftsman ===
The University of Pennsylvania Museum sponsored archaeological excavations at Tepe Gawra and Khafaji, Iraq, in 1937. Bendiner went along as project draftsman on the 8-month excavation, drawing site plans and sections of the dig, and making measured drawings of the artifacts uncovered. He again worked as an archaeological draftsman on an excavation in Tikal, Guatemala, in 1960.

=== Caricaturist ===
Hungarian-American violinist Arthur Hartmann was Bendiner's uncle, and his maternal grandfather had also been a violinist. In 1938, Bendiner pitched himself to the Philadelphia Evening Bulletin as a music critic, but with a twist: each review would be illustrated by his caricature of the featured musician, drawn during the performance. His caricatures became highly popular, and he reproduced them as lithographs, earning him the moniker "The Hirschfeld of Philadelphia." He retired from music criticism in 1946, and collected his favorite reviews and caricatures in the 1952 book Music to My Eyes.

=== Muralist ===
Bendiner's first mural commission was for Gimbel Brothers Department Store in Philadelphia, in 1952. The subject was a musical event that had occurred thirteen years earlier: Sergei Rachmaninoff performing as piano soloist in his Symphony No. 3 with the Philadelphia Orchestra. Rachmaninoff had chosen the Philadelphia Orchestra under conductor Leopold Stokowski to perform the work's world premiere, November 6, 1936. He returned three years later to perform Symphony No. 3 under conductor Eugene Ormandy and to make the first recording of it. The mural depicted the December 2, 1939 concert at the Academy of Music, the composer/pianist's final appearance with the orchestra. Rachmaninoff died in 1943. The mural is illustrated in Bendiner's autobiography.

Fidelity Bank commissioned Bendiner to paint twin murals for its Rittenhouse Square branch: Rittenhouse Square, 1856 and Rittenhouse Square, 1956. He also painted murals for the offices of Blue Cross of Greater Philadelphia (1959); and The Story of Man for the University of Pennsylvania Museum.

=== Author ===
Bendiner's books include:

- Music to My Eyes (1952)
- Bendiner's Philadelphia (1964)
- Translated from the Hungarian: Notes toward an Autobiography (1967)

== Personal ==
Bendiner married Elizabeth "Betty" Sutro (1904-1991) in August 1938. They had met a decade earlier when they shared the same drafting table at Penn, she during the day and he at night. Bendiner described them as a "mixed marriage" between an Orthodox Jew and an "Old Philadelphia" Episcopalian. She assisted him on the 1960 Guatemala archaeological excavation.
