= Van Buren House =

Van Buren House may refer to:

- David Van Buren House, Fulton, New York, listed on the NRHP in Oswego County, New York
- John Van Buren Tavern, Fulton, New York, listed on the NRHP in Oswego County, New York
- Volkert Van Buren House, Fulton, New York, listed on the NRHP in Oswego County, New York
- Martin Van Buren National Historic Site, Kinderhook, New York, listed on the NRHP in New York
- Sarah Belle Van Buren House, Hartland, Wisconsin, listed on the National Register of Historic Places in Waukesha County, Wisconsin
