= Volkert =

Volkert may refer to:

== People ==
- Cynthia Volkert (born 1960), American-German nanoscientist
- Edward Charles Volkert (1871–1935), American painter
- Georg Volkert (1945–2020), German footballer
- Stephan Volkert (born 1971), German rower
- Volkert Doeksen (born 1963), Dutch money manager
- Volkert van der Graaf (born 1969), Dutch assassin
- Volkert Kraeft (born 1941), German actor
- Volkert Merl (born 1940), German racing driver
- Volkert Overlander (1570–1630), Dutch noble, jurist, ship-owner and merchant
- Volkert Simon Maarten van der Willigen (1822–1878), Dutch mathematician and physicist

== Companies ==
- Volkert, Inc., a consulting firm headquartered in Mobile, Alabama

== Buildings ==
- Volkert Van Buren House, historic home in Oswego County, New York
