= List of United States post office murals in Georgia =

Following is a list of United States post office murals created in Georgia between 1934 and 1943.

Location	Mural title	Image	Artist	Date	Notes	NRHP listed
Adel	Plantation Scene		Alice Flint	1941	oil on canvas; relocated from the original post office to the current building	2009
Augusta	The British Come to See Augusta		William Dean Fausett	1939	tempera on gesso; in storage at Augusta Museum of Art	
Augusta	Plantation, Transportation, Education		Abraham Harriton	1941	on display at the Augusta Convention and Visitor's Bureau	
Blakely	The Land is Bought from the Indians		David Putnam Brinley	1938	oil on canvas	
Cairo	Products of Grady County		Paul L. Gill	1938	oil on canvas; on display at Grady County Museum. The U.S. Post Office is included in the NRHP-listed Cairo Commercial Historic District	1994
Camilla	Theme of the South		Laura G. Douglas	1942	oil on canvas	
College Park	Arrival of the Atlanta and West Point Railroad		Jack McMillen	1938	oil on canvas on display at College Park Post Office	
Commerce	Early Mail Service and Construction of the Railroads		Philip Guston	1938	tempera	
Conyers	The Ploughman		Elizabeth Terell	1940	Winner of the 48-State Mural Competition	
Cornelia	Northern Georgia		Charles Trumbo Henry	1939	tempera on paperboard	
Cuthbert	Last Indian Troubles in Randolph County – 1836		Carlo Ciampaglia	1939		
Decatur	Dogwood and Azalea		Paul Rohland	1938	Relocated to the Richard B. Russell Federal Building in Atlanta	
Eastman	Georgia Lumberman Receiving Mail by Star Route Wagon		Arthur E. Schmalz	1938		
Greensboro	The Burning of Greensboro		Carson Davenport	1939		
Greensboro	Cotton Picking in Georgia		Carson Davenport	1939		
Hartwell	A Letter		Orlin E. Clayton	1939		
Jackson	Cotton – From Field to Mill		Philip Evergood	1949		
Jesup	General Oglethorpe Concludes a Treaty of Amity and Peace with the Creek Indians – May 18, 1733		David Hutchison	1938	on display at the Wayne County Library	
Lawrenceville	Spring in Georgia		Andree Ruellan	1942	on display at the Stephens Federal Building in Athens, Georgia	
Louisville	Plantation, Education, Transportation		Abraham Harrison	1941	By 1993 the mural had been removed to storage.	
McDonough	Cotton Gin Mill		Louis Henry Jean Charlot	1941		
Pelham	Pelham Landscape		Georgina Klitgaard	1941	oil on canvas	
Statesboro	Spring		Caroline Speare Rohland	1941	acrylic on canvas; on indefinite loan to Georgia Southern University Museum	
Swainsboro	Experimenting with the First Model of the Cotton Gin		Edna Reindel	1939	on display at the Emmanuel County Courthouse	
Sylvania	Spring		Caroline Speare Rohland	1941	Removed in the 1980s due to a complaint from the NAACP. In 1995, it was discovered in a closet, restored, and is now displayed by Georgia Southern University	
Sylvester	Cantaloupe Industry		Chester J. Tingler	1939		
Vidalia	The County Store and the Post Office		Daniel Celentano	1938	The middle section of the mural was destroyed. It was restored as two separate murals. Now on display at the Vidalia City Hall	
