= Olivier Guillon =

French-German materials scientist and engineer

Olivier Guillon is a French-German materials scientist and engineer. He is the Chief Executive Director of the Luxembourg Institute of Science and Technology.

== Life and career ==
Olivier Guillon studied materials science at the Ecole des Mines d'Alès and obtained his doctorate Electromechanical characterization and modelling of PZT ferroelectric ceramics at the Université de Franche-Comté in 2003. In parallel, he studied music at the conservatory of Besançon (majoring in organ).

Turning down a permanent position at INSA Lyon, he moved to Germany in 2004 and worked as a postdoctoral researcher in Prof. Jürgen Rödel's group at Technische Universität Darmstadt. After a research stay at the University of Washington, he returned to Darmstadt in 2007 to lead a DFG-funded Emmy Noether group.

Guillon was appointed in 2011 to the professorship of Mechanics of Functional Materials at Friedrich Schiller University Jena. The habilitation process Constrained sintering of ceramic materials started at Technische Universität Darmstadt was completed in January 2012. . In February 2014, he became director of the Institute of Energy and Climate Research (now Institute of Energy Materials and Devices) at Forschungszentrum Jülich, coupled with an appointment as full professor at RWTH Aachen University. He has also been a visiting professor at the Tokyo Institute of Technology, University of Grenoble Alpes & CEA and National Taiwan University of Science and Technology.

He has been the chief executive officer of the Luxembourg Institute of Science and Technology (LIST), the national research center for natural and engineering sciences, since September 2025. He is also an affiliate professor at the University of Luxembourg.

== Research focus ==
Guillon's research focuses on ceramic materials and components for energy applications as well as on ceramic manufacturing processes, particularly sintering. His interests include solid-state lithium and sodium batteries, solid oxide fuel and electrolysis cells, gas separation membranes and catalytic membrane reactors, high-temperature ceramics, and protective coatings for gas turbines. He has been investigating new sintering processes, especially under the effect of mechanical stresses and electric fields. From 2016 to 2023, he coordinated the DFG Priority Program Manipulation of matter controlled by electric and magnetic field: Towards novel synthesis and processing routes of inorganic materials (SPP 1959).

== Memberships ==
- Since 2012: Founder and head of the expert group Field Assisted Sintering Technique/Spark Plasma Sintering (FAST/SPS) in the Powder Metallurgy Joint Committee
- Since 2016: Member of the German Advisory Council on Battery Research (Bundesministerium für Bildung und Forschung)
- Since 2019: Member of the management board (Helmholtz Energy) and contact person for the research program Materials and Technologies for the Energy Transition
- Since 2019: Member of the board, Deutsche Keramische Gesellschaft eV

== Awards and honors ==
Olivier Guillon was awarded the Masing Memorial Prize of the German Materials Society in 2010. In 2011, he received the Robert L.Coble Award for Young Scholars from the American Ceramic Society and the Materials Science and Technology Prize from the Federation of European Materials Societies. In 2019, he became a member of the International Institute for the Science of Sintering and a member of the World Academic of Ceramics. Olivier was selected as a Fellow of the European Ceramic Society in 2021 and a Fellow of the American Ceramic Society in 2022.

== Selected publications ==
=== Book ===
- Advanced Ceramics for Energy Conversion and Storage. Elsevier, 2019. doi.org/10.1016/C2017-0-04078-8, ISBN 978-0-08-102726-4

=== Articles ===
- with Jesus Gonzalez‐Julian, Benjamin Dargatz, Tobias Kessel, Gabi Schierning, Jan Räthel, Mathias Herrmann: Field-Assisted Sintering Technology/Spark Plasma Sintering:Mechanisms, Materials, and Technology Developments. In: Advanced Engineering Materials. Volume 16, Nr. 7, Juli 2014.doi.org/10.1002/adem.201300409, Pages 830-849.
- with Chih-Long Tsai, Vladimir Roddatis, C Vinod Chandran, Qianli Ma, Sven Uhlenbruck, Martin Bram, Paul Heitjans: Li_{7}La_{3}Zr_{2}O_{12} Interface Modification for Li Dendrite Prevention. In: ACS applied materials and interfaces. Volume 8, Nr. 16, 27. April 2016.doi.org/10.1021/acsami.6b00831, Pages 10617-10626.
- with Wendelin Deibert, Mariya E Ivanova, Stefan Baumann, Wilhelm A Meulenberg: Ion-conducting ceramic membrane reactors for high-temperature applications.In: Journal of membrane science. Volume 543,1. Dezember 2017.doi.org/10.1016/j.memsci.2017.08.016, Pages 79–97.
- with Christian Elsässer, Oliver Gutfleisch, Jürgen Janek, Sandra Korte-Kerzel, Dierk Raabe, Cynthia A Volkert: Manipulation of matter by electric and magnetic fields: Toward novel synthesis and processing routes of inorganic materials. In: Materials Today. Volume 21, Nr. 5, Juni 2018. doi.org/10.1016/j.mattod.2018.03.026, Pages 527-536.
- with Apurv Dash, Robert Vaßen, Jesus Gonzalez-Julian: Molten salt shielded synthesis of oxidation prone materials in air .In:Nature materials. Volume 18, Nr. 5, Mai 2019. Pages 465-470.
- with Stephan Sarner, Andrea Schreiber, Norbert H Menzler: Recycling Strategies for Solid Oxide Cells.In: Advanced Engineering Materials.Volume 12, Nr. 35, September 2022.doi.org/10.1002/aenm.202201805, Page 2201805.
- with Wolfgang Rheinheimer, Martin Bram: A Perspective on Emerging and Future Sintering Technologies of Ceramic Materials. In: Advanced Engineering Materials. 17 March 2023.doi.org/10.1002/adem.202201870,Page 2201870.
