= Robert Vaßen =

German physicist

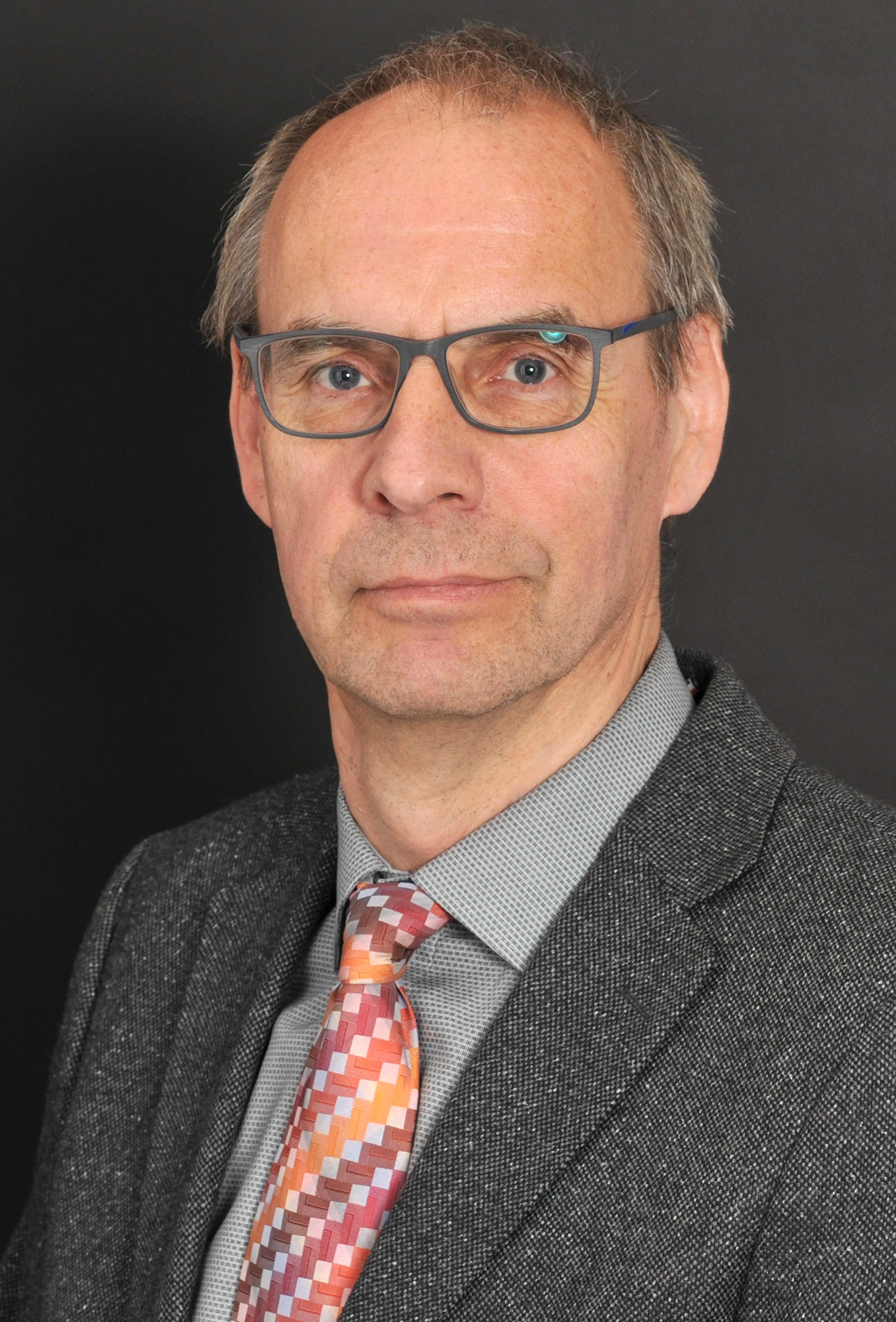
Robert Vaßen (2019)

Robert Vaßen is a German physicist and holds a teaching professorship at the Ruhr University Bochum at the Institute of Materials in the Department of Ceramics Technology. He is head of the department "Materials for High Temperature Technologies" and deputy head of the Institute of Energy Materials and Devices (IMD-2): Materials Synthesis and Processing at Forschungszentrum Jülich.

== Life and career ==
Vaßen studied physics at the RWTH Aachen University from 1980 to 1986, where he received his diploma. At the same university, he received his PhD in solid-state physics under Prof. Uhlmaier with the thesis Diffusion of Helium in Cubic-Space-Centered and Hexagonal Metals in 1990. After his PhD, he was a scientific assistant at IEK-1 Institute for Energy and Climate Research (now Institute of Energy Materials and Devices IMD-2), Forschungszentrum Jülich, where he became head of department in 1998 and deputy head of the institute since 2014. During this time, he habilitated at Ruhr University Bochum in 2004 with the topic of development of new oxide thermal barrier coatings for applications in stationary and aero-gas turbines. Since 2010, he has been a visiting professor at the University West, Trollhättan, Sweden. In 2014, he turned down a call for a W3 professorship in coating technology at the Technische Universität Berlin.

Since 2014, Vaßen has been a PhD supervisor of more than 75 students, 40 of them his own PhD students at the Ruhr University Bochum and the others as co-lecturer at various universities such as University West, Trollhättan, Sweden, University of Cambridge, Imperial College London and University of Manchester, all three United Kingdom, University of Stuttgart, University of Bayreuth, Mines Paris Tech, and others.

== Research focus ==
Vaßen's research focuses on the development of high-temperature materials and coatings also with additional functional properties such as sensing properties, self-healing capabilities or enhanced strain tolerance. He is also active in the development of functional coatings for solid oxide fuel cells and membranes for oxygen and hydrogen separation. Recently, repair technologies, especially by cold gas spraying, aerosol deposition processes, and coating solutions for alkaline and PEM electrolysis have also been developed.

== Memberships ==
- Since 2008: Member of the DIN Standards Committee on Welding and Allied Processes (NAS)
- German Ceramic Society (DKG) (German: Deutsche Keramische Gesellschaft e.V.)
- Gemeinschaft Thermisches Spritzen e.V. (GTS) - Association of Thermal Sprayers
- Reviewer for the German research foundation (German: Deutsche Forschungsgemeinschaft; DFG), the Alexander-von-Humboldt-Foundation, the Carl-Zeiss-Stiftung, the AiF, and several national research organizations

== Awards ==
- 2017: Appointment as Fellow of the American Ceramic Society
- 2017: Induction into the ASM/TSS Hall of Fame of Thermal Spray
- Since 2017: Editor of the Journal of the European Ceramic Society
- 2019: Appointment as Fellow of ASM/TSS
- 2019: Elected as a member of the DFG Review Board "Materials Engineering" for "Coating and Surface Technology"
- 2022: European SOFT Innovation Award (€50,000 prize money) together with scientists of KIT (Kalsruhe Institute of Technology (KIT) for the development of plasma sprayed, functionally graded coatings for fusion power plants
- 2024: International ASM ALbert Sauveur Award
- 2025: Böttger Badge of the German ceramic society (DKG)

== Selected publications ==
- with Daniel E. Mack, Martin Tandler, Yoo J. Sohn, Doris Sebold, Olivier Guillon: Unique performance of thermal barrier coatings made of yttria-stabilized zirconia at extreme temperatures (> 1500 °C). In: Journal of the American Ceramic Society, Volume 104, Nr. 1, September 2020. doi:10.1111/jace.17452, Pages 463–471.
- with Apurv Dash, Olivier Guillon, Jesus Gonzalez-Julian: Molten salt shielded synthesis of oxidation prone materials in air. In: Nature materials. Volume 18, Nr. 5, Mai 2019. doi:10.1038/s41563-019-0328-1, Pages 465–470.
- with Tobias Kalfhaus, M. Schneider, B. Ruttert, Doris Sebold, T. Hammerschmidt, Werner Theisen, Gunther F. Eggler, Olivier Guillon: Repair of Ni-based single-crystal superalloys using Vacuum Plasma Spray. In: Materials & Design, Volume 168, 15. April 2019. doi:10.1016/j.matdes.2019.107656, Page 107656.
- with R Singh, S Schruefer, S Wilson, Jens Gibmeier: Influence of coating thickness on residual stress and adhesion-strength of cold-sprayed Inconel 718 coatings. In: Surface and Coatings Technology, Volume 350, September 2018. doi:10.1016/j.surfcoat.2018.06.08, Pages 64–73.
- with Emine Bakan: Ceramic top coats of plasma-sprayed thermal barrier coatings: materials, processes, and properties. In: Journal of Thermal Spray Technology, Volume 26, Nr. 6, Juli 2017. doi:10.1007/s11666-017-0597-7, Pages 992–1010.
- with Armelle Vardelle, Christian Moreau, Jun Akedo, Hossein Ashrafizadeh, Christopher C. Berndt, Jörg O. Berghaus, Petri Vuoristo: The 2016 thermal spray roadmap. In: Journal of Thermal Spray Technology, Volume 25, Nr. 8, Dezember 2016. doi.org/10.1007/s11666-016-0473-x, Pages 1376–1440.
- with Markus Haydn, Kai Ortner, Thomas Franco, Sven Uhlenbruck, Norbert H. Menzler, Detlev Stöver: Multi-layer thin-film electrolytes for metal supported solid oxide fuel cells. In: Journal of Power Sources, Volume 256, Juni 2014. doi:10.1016/j.jpowsour.2014.01.043, Pages 52–60.
- with Maria O. Jarligo, Georg Mauer, Martin Bram, Stefan Baumann: Plasma Spray Physical Vapor Deposition of La_{1-x}Sr_{x}CoyFe_{1−y}O_{3−δ} Thin-Film Oxygen Transport Membrane on Porous Metallic Supports. In: Journal of thermal spray technology, Volume 23, Nr. 1, 2014. doi:10.1007/s11666-013-0004-y, Pages 213–219.
- with Xueqiang Cao, Frank Tietz, Debabrata Basu, Detlev Stöver: Zirconates as new materials for thermal barrier coatings. In: Journal of the American Ceramic Society, Volume 83, Nr. 8. doi:10.1111/j.1151-2916.2000.tb01506.x, Pages 2023–2028.
- with Detlev Stöver: Processing and properties of nanograin silicon carbide. In: Journal of the American Ceramic Society, Volume 82, Nr. 10, Oktober 1999. doi:10.1111/j.1151-2916.1999.tb02127.x, Pages 2585–2593.
