= Oak Street School =

Oak Street School may refer to:

- Oak Street School (Lewiston, Maine), listed on U.S. NRHP
- Oak Street School (Fulton, New York), NRHP
