= Granby, New York =

- Town
- Location in Oswego County and the state of New York.
- Coordinates: 43°17′32″N 76°26′24″W
- Country: United States
- State: New York
- County: Oswego

Area
  - Total: 46.35 sq mi (120.05 km^{2})
  - Land: 44.65 sq mi (115.64 km^{2})
  - Water: 1.70 sq mi (4.41 km^{2})
- Elevation: 436 ft (133 m)

Population (2020)
  - Total: 6,520
  - Density: 147.3/sq mi (56.88/km^{2})
- Time zone: UTC-5 (Eastern (EST))
  - Summer (DST): UTC-4 (EDT)
- ZIP code: 13069
- Area code: 315
- FIPS code: 36-29729
- GNIS feature ID: 0979011

Granby is a town in Oswego County, New York, United States. The population was 6,821 at the 2010 census.

The Town of Granby is in the southwest corner of the county.

== History ==
The town was first settled circa 1792. Granby was created in 1818 from the Town of Hannibal and part of the Town of Lysander in Onondaga County. A small northern part of the town was lost to the Town of Oswego in 1836. Although first settled in 1792, it was actually discovered many years later by John Bradshaw (cricketer) (1812–1880), first-class cricketer and cleric, from Granby, Nottinghamshire and whom, after his discovery, returned triumphantly to England and became Vicar of Granby-cum-Sutton in 1845.

== Geography ==
According to the United States Census Bureau, the town has a total area of 46.5 square miles (120 km^{2}), of which 44.9 square miles (116 km^{2}) is land and 1.6 square miles (4.1 km^{2}) (3.36%) is water.

The eastern town line borders the Oswego River and the City of Fulton. The southern town boundary is the border of Onondaga County. Granby borders the town of Hannibal on the west and towns of Oswego and Minetto on the north.

== Demographics ==
Historical population
Census	Pop.	Note	%±
1820	555		—
1830	1,423		156.4%
1840	2,385		67.6%
1850	2,344		−1.7%
1860	4,057		73.1%
1870	3,972		−2.1%
1880	4,514		13.6%
1890	2,317		−48.7%
1900	2,195		−5.3%
1910	2,022		−7.9%
1920	1,913		−5.4%
1930	2,130		11.3%
1940	2,220		4.2%
1950	2,775		25.0%
1960	3,704		33.5%
1970	4,718		27.4%
1980	6,341		34.4%
1990	7,013		10.6%
2000	7,009		−0.1%
2010	6,821		−2.7%
2020	6,520		−4.4%
U.S. Decennial Census

As of the census of 2000, there were 7,009 people, 2,605 households, and 1,917 families residing in the town. The population density was 156.0 inhabitants per square mile (60.2/km^{2}). There were 2,869 housing units at an average density of 63.9 per square mile (24.7/km^{2}). The racial makeup of the town was 97.57% White, 0.54% African American, 0.46% Native American, 0.23% Asian, 0.34% from other races, and 0.86% from two or more races. Hispanic or Latino of any race were 1.37% of the population.

There were 2,605 households, out of which 37.0% had children under the age of 18 living with them, 55.5% were married couples living together, 11.6% had a female householder with no husband present, and 26.4% were non-families. 19.8% of all households were made up of individuals, and 6.7% had someone living alone who was 65 years of age or older. The average household size was 2.69 and the average family size was 3.07.

In the town, the population was spread out, with 28.3% under the age of 18, 7.5% from 18 to 24, 30.1% from 25 to 44, 23.8% from 45 to 64, and 10.3% who were 65 years of age or older. The median age was 36 years. For every 100 females, there were 98.3 males. For every 100 females age 18 and over, there were 96.4 males.

The median income for a household in the town was $36,610, and the median income for a family was $41,127. Males had a median income of $33,390 versus $24,125 for females. The per capita income for the town was $16,826. About 11.1% of families and 14.2% of the population were below the poverty line, including 22.6% of those under age 18 and 1.8% of those age 65 or over.

== Education ==
Granby has no school district of its own. It is divided among the Fulton City School District, Phoenix School District, Hannibal Central School District, and Cato-Meridian School District in terms of K-12 public education.

== Communities and locations in Granby ==
- Battle Island State Park – a state park on the western bank of the Oswego River, in the northeast part of the town.
- Bowens Corners – once called Liberty's Corners, a hamlet southwest of Fulton on Route 176.
- Dexterville – a hamlet on the western town line, west of Granby Center.
- Granby Center – a hamlet in the northern part of the town. It was formerly known as "Williams Corners"; it is west of Fulton on Route 3.
- Hinmansville – a hamlet in the southern part of the town by the Oswego River.
- Lake Neatahwanta – a lakeside community west of the City of Fulton.
- Lewis Corners – a hamlet north of Granby Center near the Minetto town line.
- Ox Creek – a tributary of the Oswego River.
- Pember Corners – a hamlet on the town line in the northwestern part of the town.
- South Granby – a hamlet in the southern part of the town, northwest of Hinmansville.
- West Granby – a former community in the town.
- Brook was a post office located just north of the county line.
