= Fulton, Oswego County, New York =

City in Oswego County, New York, US

Fulton, New York
- City
- Downtown Fulton (2026)

- Location in Oswego County and the state of New York.
- Coordinates: 43°18′58″N 76°25′06″W
- Country: United States
- State: New York
- County: Oswego
- Incorporated (village): 1835
- Incorporated (city): 1902

Government
  - Type: Mayor-Council
  - Mayor: Jim Rice (D)
  - City Council: Members' List: • W1: Thomas Kenyon (C); • W2: Douglas Chapman (R); • W3: Donald Patrick, Jr. (D); • W4: John Kenyon (C); • W5: Audrey Avery (R); • W6: Lawrence Macner (R)

Area
  - Total: 4.97 sq mi (12.86 km^{2})
  - Land: 3.92 sq mi (10.16 km^{2})
  - Water: 1.04 sq mi (2.69 km^{2})

Population (2020)
  - Total: 11,389
  - Density: 2,903.0/sq mi (1,120.85/km^{2})
- FIPS code: 36-27815
- Website: cityoffultonny.gov

Fulton is a city in the western part of Oswego County, New York, United States. The population was 11,389 as of the 2020 census. The city is named after Robert Fulton, the inventor of the steamboat.

== History ==
The city of Fulton is a community in two parts. The area on the west side of the Oswego River was formerly known as "Oswego Falls" recognizing the nearby rapids on the river. (The name "Oswego" is from the Iroquois word meaning "the outpouring.") It was one of the first regions settled in the original Town of Granby. Settlements took place in two west-side locations, the "Upper Landing" and the "Lower Landing." The community was incorporated as a village in 1835. In 1902, the Village of Fulton and the Village of Oswego Falls merged, and the resulting community was chartered as the City of Fulton. The two sides of the river have long been connected by two bridges-one known locally as the "upper bridge" (Broadway/NY State Route 3) and the other more commonly known as the "lower bridge" (Oneida St.) Both bridges have been rebuilt or refurbished a number of times during the history of the villages and city.

On August 6, 1931, Baseball Hall of Fame pitcher Grover Cleveland Alexander, pitching for the House of David semi-pro team, defeated the Byrne Sieberlings 5–3 in a game played in Fulton, NY. The contest was played before only 2,000 people. The Byrne Sieberlings, sponsored by the J. P. Byrne Tire Company, featured some of Central New York's greatest semi-pro ball players.

The industrial nature of the small city led to a very stable workforce for many years. In fact, during the Great Depression of the early 1930s, the New York Sun newspaper (NYC) wrote a lengthy article describing Fulton, its residents and the strong local economy. It was headlined as, "Fulton, the City the Great Depression Missed."

In 1942, Caroline Speare Rohland won a WPA commission to paint a post office mural for the town. Father LeMoyne Trying to Convert the Indians on Pathfinder Island was an oil on canvas depicting local Indians interacting with Europeans. The post office was placed on the National Register of Historic Places for Oswego County, New York in 1989.

At a May 2009 Common Council meeting, it was disclosed that the City of Fulton was exploring the possibility of merging with the neighboring towns of Granby and Volney to create one larger city. This idea has been floated several times before and has yet to come to fruition.

The Oak Street School, Mount Adnah Cemetery, Fulton Public Library, Chancellor (tugboat), John Wells Pratt House, State Street Methodist Episcopal Church, David Van Buren House, John Van Buren Tavern, Volkert Van Buren House, and United States Post Office are listed on the National Register of Historic Places. The Oswego Canal, which passes through Fulton, is included in the New York State Barge Canal Historic District. The West Broadway Commercial Historic District was added to the National Register of Historic Places in 2020.

== Industrial and commercial history ==
American Woolen Mills, a large textile firm located on the west bank of the Oswego River, provided uniforms and other cloth-related supplies for the US Army in both World Wars. Many early Italian and Polish immigrants lived in simple wood-framed company housing and shopped at the company store during this time period. The factory-owned housing was eventually sold to the employee-occupants. Joining the woolen mills was the adjacent "Silk Mill." The American Woolen Mills closed their Fulton operations in the early 1950s. The largest buildings were demolished in the summer of 1962. Another industry located on the west side of the river bank and using the force of the river water to power manufacturing equipment was the Foster Brothers' Knife Works, which produced cutlery. Besides Poles, the west side of the river was also settled with a sizable community of Italian immigrants as well as Czechoslovaks, Ukrainians, Syrians, and other, mostly Eastern European nationalities.

The area on the east side of the Oswego River was originally a part of the Township of Volney. Over time the east-side grew in industry, commerce, and residential development. In its prime, the east-side had a significant (several square blocks) downtown area (the primary retail business area was once known as "The Dizzy Block") with nearly one hundred stores and shops.

Several factories were located north and the south of the downtown area along the Oswego River to make use of the rapids and fast-flowing water for power. Some of the industries located here over the years included Hunter Arms, Hunter Bicycle, Hunter Fan, Sealright-Oswego Falls Corporation (later, Phillips 66 Corporation and more recently, Huhtamäki Consumer Packaging) making paper and plastic coated packaging, Dilts, (later, Black-Clawson), a paper and plastic machine manufacturer.

When Peter Cailer Kohler (later Nestlé, S.A.) began chocolate production in the United States, Fulton became home to the first U.S. chocolate manufacturing facility, notably producing milk chocolate invented by Peter. Many Swiss, skilled in the art of making chocolate, followed the company to Fulton and settled here. Many of their descendants still live in the area. In 1938, the Nestle Crunch bar was invented at the facility. However, in 2003, after more than 100 years, citing the high cost of restoring and updating the aging plant, Nestle closed the factory, leaving four hundred local employees jobless. Factory employees hung the Nestlé company flag outside the factory upside down the day the closing was announced by company officials.

Subsequent to the closing of the Nestlé plant, investors from Ivory Coast purchased the chocolate factory and attempted to reopen it as "New York Chocolate and Confections Company". The company filed for bankruptcy and local Oswego County officials tried to find an appropriate buyer for the property so that it could continue to work toward a reopening. On June 30, 2010, the plant and its assets were sold again. Subsequently, the facility was demolished to allow for redevelopment. Facilities currently operating on the site include an Aldi supermarket and a Technical Operations facility for Spectrum.

The Miller Brewing Company operated a plant in the Town of Volney, (just outside Fulton city limits) from the mid-1970s until its closure in 1994. The former plant was partially retrofitted and was used for a short time as an ethanol production facility with only limited production. In 2008, the owners filed for bankruptcy and in May, 2009, the facility was sold at auction to Sunoco. A retrofit was completed and the facility returned to production of biofuels on June 21, 2010. At full production rate, the renovated plant was able to produce in excess of 85 million gallons of fuel-grade ethanol per year, along with 400 million pounds of animal feed annually.

In September 2019, Attis Ethanol LLC. purchased the facility from Sunoco, which included a 10 year offtake agreement for the sale of ethanol. In March 21, 2019, the ethanol plant was shuttered and the facility was fully idled in August 2019. The facility continued to sit vacant and in October 2021, the smoke from burning corn in one of the facility's two silos began to overtake the nearby townships. The fire was extinguished in October 2022.

== Government ==
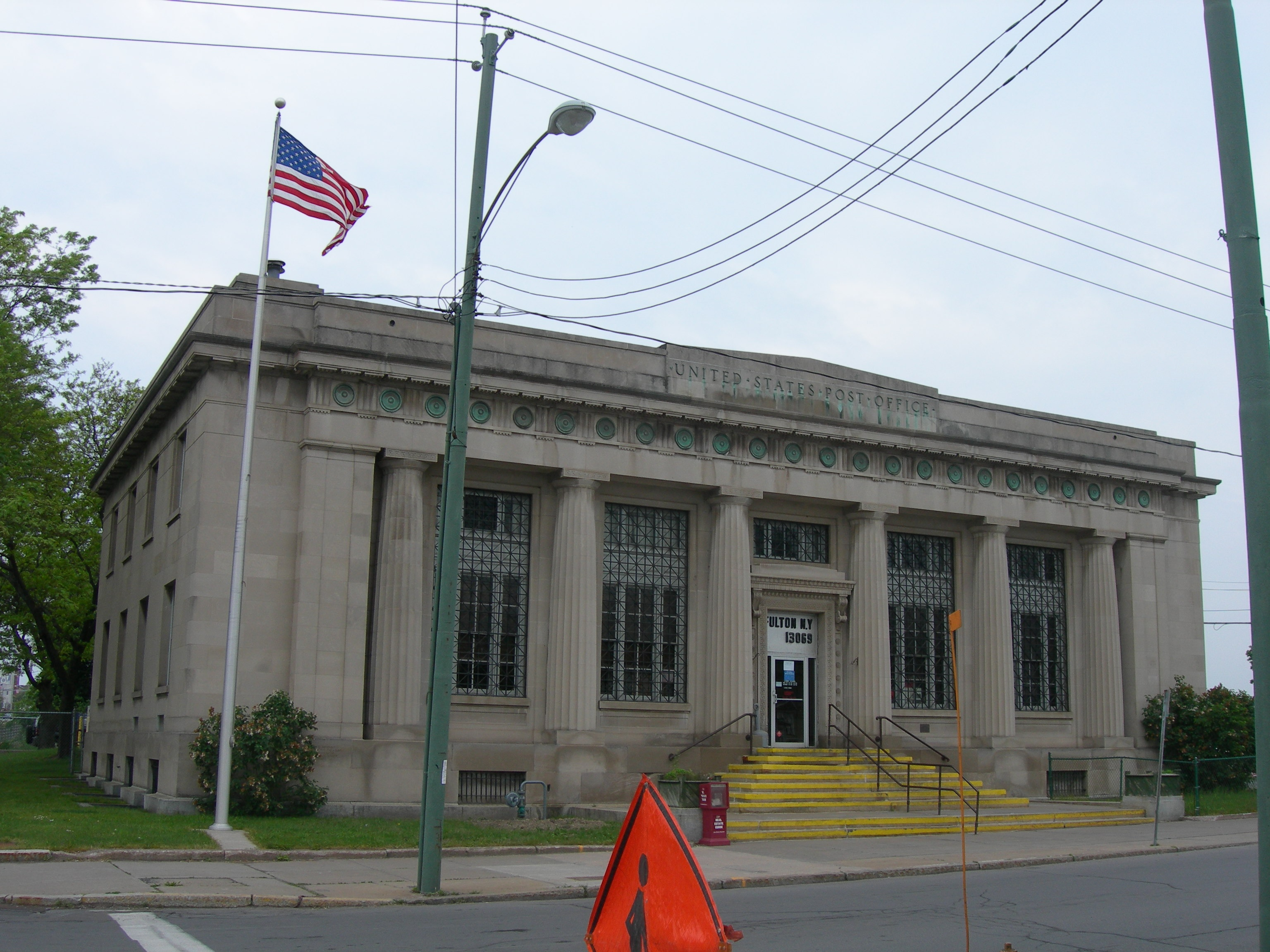
U.S. Post Office in Fulton

Fulton is governed by an elected mayor and common-council form of government. Administratively and politically, the city is divided into six wards. City hall is located on South First Street near Academy Street and faces a small park and military memorial which overlooks the Oswego River. Fulton supports both a small professional police force and a fire department with two fire stations. The police station and the east-side fire station are included in the city hall complex.

== Geography and weather ==
According to the United States Census Bureau, the city has a total area of 4.8 square miles (12 km^{2}), of which 3.8 square miles (9.8 km^{2}) is land and 0.9 square miles (2.3 km^{2}) (19.75%) is water.

Fulton is located near Lake Ontario and receives significant "lake-effect snow" fall in excess of a 100 inches (250 cm) per year.

== Demographics ==
Historical population
Census	Pop.	Note	%±
1850	2,344		—
1870	3,507		—
1880	3,941		12.4%
1890	4,214		6.9%
1900	5,281		25.3%
1910	10,480		98.4%
1920	13,043		24.5%
1930	12,462		−4.5%
1940	13,362		7.2%
1950	13,922		4.2%
1960	14,261		2.4%
1970	14,003		−1.8%
1980	13,312		−4.9%
1990	12,929		−2.9%
2000	11,855		−8.3%
2010	11,896		0.3%
2020	11,389		−4.3%
U.S. Decennial Census

As of the census of 2000, there were 11,855 people, 4,923 households, and 2,973 families residing in the city. The population density was 3,102.9 inhabitants per square mile (1,198.0/km^{2}). There were 5,501 housing units at an average density of 1,439.8 per square mile (555.9/km^{2}). The racial makeup of the city was 96.80% White, 0.74% Black or African American, 0.37% Native American, 0.33% Asian, 0.03% Pacific Islander, 0.88% from other races, and 0.85% from two or more races. Hispanic or Latino of any race were 1.92% of the population.

There were 4,923 households, out of which 31.8% had children under the age of 18 living with them, 40.9% were married couples living together, 15.0% had a female householder with no husband present, and 39.6% were non-families. 33.6% of all households were made up of individuals, and 15.8% had someone living alone who was 65 years of age or older. The average household size was 2.38 and the average family size was 3.02.

In the city, the population was spread out, with 27.2% under the age of 18, 8.7% from 18 to 24, 28.0% from 25 to 44, 20.1% from 45 to 64, and 16.0% who were 65 years of age or older. The median age was 36 years. For every 100 females, there were 89.1 males. For every 100 females age 18 and over, there were 84.0 males.

The median income for a household in the city was $29,054, and the median income for a family was $38,655. Males had a median income of $35,665 versus $23,102 for females. The per capita income for the city was $16,133. About 15.1% of families and 19.3% of the population were below the poverty line, including 25.6% of those under age 18 and 12.7% of those age 65 or over.

== Recreation ==
Fulton has a number of parks and areas of interest. Recreation Park, a city-owned facility on the banks of Lake Neatahwanta once hosted an amusement park, indoor skating/dancing rink as well as the county fair grounds. In its earlier years, the American Woolen Mills contributed greatly to the development and upkeep of Recreation Park. Today there are both football and softball fields, a waterfront area, pier, sheltered picnic tables, grills, and other outdoor leisure facilities. The Fulton War Memorial, a multipurpose group of buildings housing an exhibition hall/gymnasium and related ante-rooms as well as an adjacent covered arena used for ice skating and related sports in the winter and other events during warmer weather. The city-owned park adjoins the property owned by the Fulton City School District and occupied by G. Ray Bodley High School. The park facilities are sometimes used by the students for selected athletic and social events. On the northwest side of the park is a city-owned campground known as Bullhead Bay that hosts tents and recreational camper units throughout the late spring, summer and early fall. Included in the park and campground is a short hiking and conservation-nature trail. Concerts are held during the summer months featuring traditional and diverse styles of music and related entertainment. Also on the west side of the River and adjacent to the lower bridge (to the north) there is a park and athletic field complex known as Foster Park. On the east side of the River one finds Voorhees Park, a city block bordered by South Fourth Street, South Third Street, Buffalo Street and Academy Street. Long ago a small bandstand connected by diagonal sidewalks to opposing corners of the park was located near the center of the acreage. Such bandstands were common in small rural towns. A new bandstand was erected in the "old downtown" area of Fulton overlooking the Oswego River and one of two locks in the "New York State Barge Canal" portion of the waterway. This bandstand, known as "The Gazebo" plays host to a variety of musical concerts in the summer season. At "Sharp's Pond," Rowlee Beach is a small beach and swimming area near State Route #3 and Emery Street.

== Education ==
Fulton was long-known as the home of the Falley Seminary, a preparatory school attended by both locals and out-of-area boarding students. This institution offered traditional classical education courses as well as some more practical coursework.

Over the years there have been a number of public schools built in neighborhoods of Fulton and surrounding towns. These include Fulton High School and its descendant institution, G. Ray Bodley High School, Fulton Junior High School, Fourth Street School (in the former Fulton High School building), Fairgreve School, James Lanigan Elementary School, Erie Street School, State Street School, Oak Street School, Phillips Street School, Pine Woods School, Walradt Street School, and Granby Elementary School. For many years there were also two Catholic schools: St. Mary's School (also known as Fulton Catholic School) on the east side and Holy Family School on the west side of town.

A branch of Cayuga Community College (CCC) is located in the retrofitted shell of a grocery store and other former retail spaces.

== Business ==
Spring 2008, a Wal-Mart Supercenter opened just outside the Fulton city limits in Granby. Construction of the store was temporarily halted in early 2007 after the New York State Department of Environmental Conservation refused access to the area to preserve nesting bald eagles during the spring mating season.

== Media ==
Radio station B104.7, which is currently the top ranked radio outlet in Central New York, is licensed to Fulton. A local newspaper known as "The Valley News" is published in Fulton twice each week. An electronic media publication, the "Oswego County Today" also maintains a publication office in Fulton.

== Notable people ==
- Carlton W. Barrett, World War II Medal of Honor Recipient
- John H. Emerick, chief telegraph operator of the Army of the James
- Albert Lindley Lee, Kansas State Supreme Court Judge, and Union general in the American Civil War.
- Mark Murphy, professional football player and CEO/President of the Green Bay Packers
- John Naioti, professional football player, Pittsburgh Steelers
- Walt Patulski, professional football player.
- Mark Roth, retired professional bowler
- Rob Schremp, professional ice hockey player
- Owen Benjamin, actor, comedian, and pianist
- Ted Wilks, professional baseball player
- Mark Murphy (singer), professional jazz artist
- Edna Skinner, actress
- Neil R. Jones, author
- Candy Cummings, professional baseball player
- Harold S. Diehl, scientist, teacher at Fulton High school, 1913 and 1914
- Betty Ford, wife of President Gerald Ford
- Bill Fivaz, author and numismatist
