= Hinmansville, New York =

Hinmansville
- hamlet
- Location within the state of New York
- Coordinates: 43°14′52″N 76°21′09″W
- Country: United States
- State: New York
- County: Oswego
- City: Granby
- Time zone: UTC-5 (Eastern (EST))
  - Summer (DST): UTC-4 (EDT)

Hinmansville is a hamlet in the town of Schroeppel in Oswego County, New York, United States, upon the Oswego River. It is within the Phoenix Central School District.

== History ==
Hinmansville was founded in 1827 by John E. Hinman. Among the first of the buildings constructed were a church and a schoolhouse, but they are no longer present. Until the late 1950s or early 1960s there was also a small general store in town (the Payne residence). There is a Hinmansville Cemetery located on Hawthorne Road, containing graves from the 1830s.

Because of its location on the Oswego River, it became a popular stop-off point for boatmen who passed by. During its heyday as a boating town, Hinmansville bore the name "Horseshoe Rifts".

Hinmansville is not listed by the U.S. Census Bureau, but is incorporated as a postal hamlet.

The unofficially estimated number of current residents is around 150.

The Minota family, descended from Polish immigrants, contains approximately 55–60 descendants in and immediately around Hinmansville. The Minotas and other families used to have large working farms which are still used today for farming small vegetables, horses, corn, and trees.

The continued use of land for farming has been an issue with regards to rezoning in the local area.
