= John Wells Pratt House =

Historic house in New York, United States

- U.S. National Register of Historic Places
- Location within New York Location within the United States
- Location: 177 S. 1st St., Fulton, New York
- Coordinates: 43°19′6″N 76°24′53″W
- Area: less than one acre
- Built: 1863
- Architectural style: Italianate
- NRHP reference No.: 99001490
- Added to NRHP: December 10, 1999

John Wells Pratt House, also known as Pratt House Museum, is a historic home and museum located at Fulton in Oswego County, New York. Built in 1863, it is a large two story residence in the Italianate style.

The house is rectangular in plan with a three bay wide, three bay deep hipped roof main block with a gabled two story service wing. It features a cupola with round arched windows. A finely detailed Queen Anne style porch was added about 1880.

It was listed on the National Register of Historic Places in 1999.
