= Lake Neatahwanta =

- Location within New York Location within the United States
- Location: Oswego County, New York, United States
- Coordinates: 43°18′31″N 76°26′20″W
- Type: Lake
- Basin countries: United States
- Surface area: 750 acres (300 ha)
- Max. depth: 12 ft (3.7 m)
- Shore length^{1}: 5.1 mi (8.2 km)
- Surface elevation: 366 ft (112 m)
- Settlements: Fulton, New York
- ^{1} Shore length is not a well-defined measure.

Lake Neatahwanta is located in and near the city of Fulton in Oswego County, New York. It covers approximately 750 acres (3.0 km^{2}) of which about one-half is located within the city, while the other half is located in the town of Granby. Neatahwanta translates to "little lake near the big lake" in Iroquois.

It is currently prohibited to swim in the lake or to allow pets to have contact with the water due to pollution and microbial growth. It is currently being dredged in hope to have it open for public use again. It is expected to be fully clean in about 2 years.

== Fishing ==
Fish species present in the lake are black crappie, pumpkinseed sunfish, bowfin, largemouth bass, northern pike, tiger muskie, white perch, black bullhead, bluegill, striped bass, and yellow perch. There is city owned access for a fee, with a hard surface boat takeoff and ramp located on the northwest shore off Phillips Street in the bordering campground.

== Water quality and environmental concerns ==
Lake Neatahwanta is classified as eutrophic due to high nutrient levels, low water clarity, and elevated concentrations of algae and chlorophyll-a. Monitoring by the New York State Department of Environmental Conservation found that phosphorus and nitrogen concentrations contribute to frequent algal blooms and reduced recreational water quality.

== Recreation impairment ==
Primary and secondary contact recreation (such as swimming and boating) are classified as impaired because of elevated phosphorus levels, which contribute to excessive algal growth in the lake. Fishing use in the lake is also considered impaired, with water quality issues including low dissolved oxygen, pH variation, and high phosphorus concentrations affecting aquatic conditions. Excessive algal and aquatic weed growth is seen as a key environmental issue in the lake and contributes to water quality impairment.

Nutrient pollution in Lake Neatahwanta is likely influenced by runoff from surrounding urban and residential areas. Stormwater runoff can carry fertilizers, sediments, and other pollutants into the lake, increasing phosphorus and nitrogen levels. These inputs contribute to eutrophication and algal blooms, particularly during warmer months.
