= Pulaski Village Historic District =

Historic district in New York, United States

- U.S. National Register of Historic Places
- U.S. Historic district
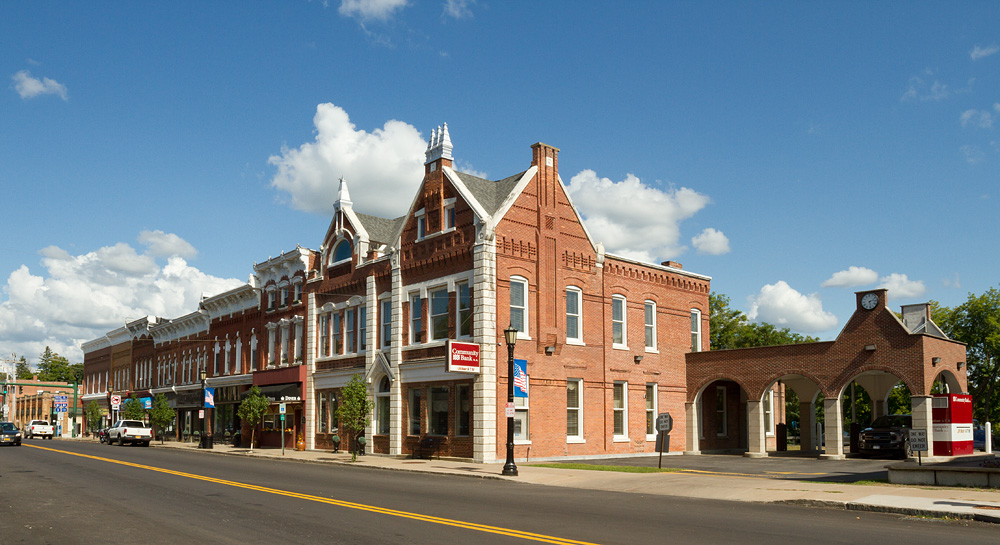

- Location within New York Location within the United States
- Location: Jefferson, Broad, Bridge, Hubbel and Lake Sts., Pulaski, New York
- Coordinates: 43°34′1″N 76°7′43″W
- Area: 11 acres (4.5 ha)
- Architect: Russell, Archimedes, et al.
- Architectural style: Italianate
- NRHP reference No.: 83004525
- Added to NRHP: September 8, 1983

Pulaski Village Historic District is a national historic district located at Pulaski in Oswego County, New York. The district includes 27 contributing buildings and two contributing sites located within the intact historic residential and commercial core of the village. The buildings include seven residences, two churches, a courthouse, and 26 commercial structures.

It was listed on the National Register of Historic Places in 1983.
