= Caroline Speare Rohland =

American artist and muralist

- circa 1930
- Born: Caroline Melvina Speare; April 15, 1885; Chelsea, Suffolk County, Massachusetts
- Died: June 12, 1964 (aged 79); New York City, New York
- Occupation: artist
- Years active: 1915-1995
- Known for: pastels of the Southern United States

Caroline Speare Rohland (April 15, 1885 – June 12, 1964) was an American artist and muralist who created three post office murals, as part of the art projects for the New Deal's Section of Painting and Sculpture. In addition to the three murals, Rohland has works in the permanent collections of the Library of Congress, The Honolulu Academy of Art, the New Mexico Museum of Art and the Whitney Museum of American Art.

== Early life ==
Caroline Melvina Speare was born on April 15, 1885, in Chelsea, Suffolk County, Massachusetts, to Edith (née Holway) and Lewis R. Speare. [U.S.Federal Census 1910] (Note: Some sources give the birth date of April 20, 1885 in Boston, but the birth record confirms April 15th in Chelsea.) She studied at the Boston Museum of Fine Arts and then at the Art Students League of New York under the instruction of John Sloan and Kenneth Hayes Miller. Then she studied with Andrew Dasburg, before making her way to the artists' community of Woodstock, New York. In 1919 she married fellow art student Paul Rohland. The couple lived in a nearby community of artists known as "The Maverick", founded by Hervey White.

== Career ==
From 1927, Rohland exhibited at the Whitney Studio Club, the precursor to the museum. In that year, she was part of a three-woman show which included Gertrude Tiemer and Georgina Klitgaard and which ran for nearly three weeks. In 1929, she and her husband both participated in a circus-themed exhibition in New York City, timed to correspond with a Barnum and Bailey show and the following year, she Rosella Hartman and the Croatian sculptor, Dujam Penić were featured at the Whitney Gallery. From the opening of the Whitney Museum of American Art in 1931, Rohland was a fixture, appearing in biennial shows until 1942. She was most known for her pastels, which had both contemporary style and sensual surfaces, often dealing with southern themes.

In the 1930s, Rohland was hired as one of the Works Progress Administration (WPA) artists. She painted idealized southern scenes, such as the 1939 portrayal of Cotton Pickers installed in the post office of Bunkie, Louisiana. In 1941, she painted Spring for the post office in Sylvania, Georgia. The scene was of a farm family and a field hand carrying out daily labors on the farm. Though many locals, black and whites alike appreciated the painting, in the 1980s, the local NAACP chapter had the painting removed as being insensitive in its depiction of the African-American farm hand. In 1995, the canvas was found wadded up in a closet of the post office and was restored. It is now in the permanent collection of Georgia Southern University on loan from the federal government. In 1942, Rohland won the commission to paint the post office mural for Fulton, New York. Father LeMoyne Trying to Convert the Indians on Pathfinder Island was an oil on canvas depicting another typical WPA theme, Native Americans interacting with Europeans. The post office was placed on the National Register of Historic Places for Oswego County, New York, in 1989.

When the WPA project ended around 1943, the Rohlands moved to Santa Fe, New Mexico. She continued to have success and was selected in 1943 for an exhibit at the Museum of Fine Arts with her traditional southern themes. In 1944, her water color Modern Death was chosen to be in the 55th annual exhibit at the Chicago Art Institute, her pastel Oh, What a Beautiful Morning was chosen for the Santa Fe Art Museum and she had several paintings in the permanent collection of the Whitney. A collection of a variety of her works, including oils, pastels and water colors were featured at the Santa Fe Fine Arts Museum in 1945. Both she and her husband participated in the 1945 Fiesta Art Exhibit of Santa Fe and that same year her works were included in a showing at the Johnson-Humrickhouse Museum, which had selected them from a 1943 Library of Congress Exhibit.

Rohland's husband died in 1949, and the following year, she returned to the Woodstock artists colony. By the late 1950s, she had expanded into photography and participated in a showing at the Woodstock Gallery in 1959, featuring photographic works.

== Death and legacy ==
Rohland died June 12, 1964, at Lenox Hill Hospital in New York City after a lengthy illness. Rohland has works in the permanent collections of the Library of Congress in Washington, D. C., the Honolulu Academy of Art, the New Mexico Museum of Art in Santa Fe and the Whitney Museum of American Art in New York City.
