= John H. Emerick =

John H. Emerick (November 7, 1843 – May 11, 1902) was one of the leading telegraph operators in the Union Army during the American Civil War, and a reconstruction era executive in a leading New York telegraph company.

== Biography ==
Emerick was born in Fulton, New York, and was educated in his hometown at Falley Seminary and later at Pulaski Academy in Pulaski, New York. Early in life, he showed a proclivity for telegraphy and resolved to make the field his life's work. Emerick worked at Oswego, New York, and Watertown, New York, helping establish the telegraph services in those towns.

In 1861 he entered the military telegraph service and was assigned to the headquarters of General Irvin McDowell in Arlington Heights, Virginia. Emerick had been appointed to the position by General Anson Singer. At this time, he was only 17 years old. Emerick had participated in the Battle of Yorktown, the Battle of Williamsburg, and the Seven Days Battles. The latter concluded with the retreat of General George McClellan to Harrison Landing. During his tenure with the United States Army, Emerick worked in the field headquarters of Generals Ambrose Burnside, Joseph Hooker, and George Meade. The time period of his service in the American Civil War encompassed the Peninsula Campaign in 1862 and the campaigns of 1863–65 in Virginia and Maryland. Emerick performed duties as both a telegraph operator and cipher clerk. He was the youngest cipher clerk in the U.S. Army.

In January 1865, Emerick was appointed the chief telegraph operator of the Army of the James and continued his work at its headquarters and in Richmond, Virginia until the telegraph corps was disbanded. Emerick was one of twelve military telegraphers who were awarded watches, presented by Edwin M. Stanton, Secretary of War, "in recognition of long and continued faithful service." The watch together with the letter which accompanied it were among the most coveted of the telegrapher's mementoes of the American Civil War. Emerick possessed one of the most valuable and extensive private collections in existence of war documents and autographs of the men prominent in the American Civil War. He obtained most of the signatures through the large volume of telegrams he handled.

Following the end of the war in 1865, Emerick continued his work as a telegrapher. Several years later, he was made general superintendent of the Postal Telegraph Company of New York. He was noted as a fine worker in his field, especially adept in sorting out the many details of the large telegraph system. The employees of the company considered him both just and considerate.

Emerick had lived in Brooklyn, New York, for many years. He died there on the night of May 11, 1902 at his home, aged 58, following a prolonged illness. He left behind a widow and four children. The funeral services were held from his residence, with the interment following in Fulton, New York.
