= Pulaski, New York =

- Village
- Location in Oswego County and the state of New York.
- Coordinates: 43°33′54″N 76°7′30″W
- Country: United States
- State: New York
- County: Oswego

Government
  - Mayor: Jeffrey Fowler
  - Deputy Mayor: Melissa Wadkinson

Area
  - Total: 3.64 sq mi (9.42 km^{2})
  - Land: 3.54 sq mi (9.16 km^{2})
  - Water: 0.10 sq mi (0.27 km^{2})
- Elevation: 371 ft (113 m)

Population (2020)
  - Total: 2,186
  - Density: 618.3/sq mi (238.71/km^{2})
- Time zone: UTC-5 (Eastern (EST))
  - Summer (DST): UTC-4 (EDT)
- ZIP Code: 13142
- Area code: 315
- FIPS code: 36-59960
- GNIS feature ID: 0961947
- Website: Village website

Pulaski (/pəˈlæskaɪ/) is a village in Oswego County, New York, United States. The population was 2,186 at the 2020 census. The village is within the town of Richland, and lies between the eastern shore of Lake Ontario and the Tug Hill region. The village is located on US 11 and is close to I-81. Pulaski lies in the Snowbelt, which is characterized by heavy amounts of lake-effect snow. It has a regional reputation for its heavy snow accumulations and adverse traveling conditions in winter, and for the long duration of winter conditions, often from mid-November through mid-April.

Although the village takes its name after General Casimir Pulaski (/pəˈlæski/ pə-LAS-kee), area residents have traditionally pronounced it with a long "i" (/pəˈlæskaɪ/ pə-LAS-kye). The historic core of the village was listed on the National Register of Historic Places in 1983 as the Pulaski Village Historic District.

== History ==
Pulaski history shows that during the early years before incorporation on April 26, 1832, the village was known by various other names. It was once called “Fishville” and sometimes it was called “Salmon River”. It was also stated that the name “Pulaski” was often spelled “Polaski”. It was also used for years with the spelling of Polaski from The Palladium Times to official state documents.

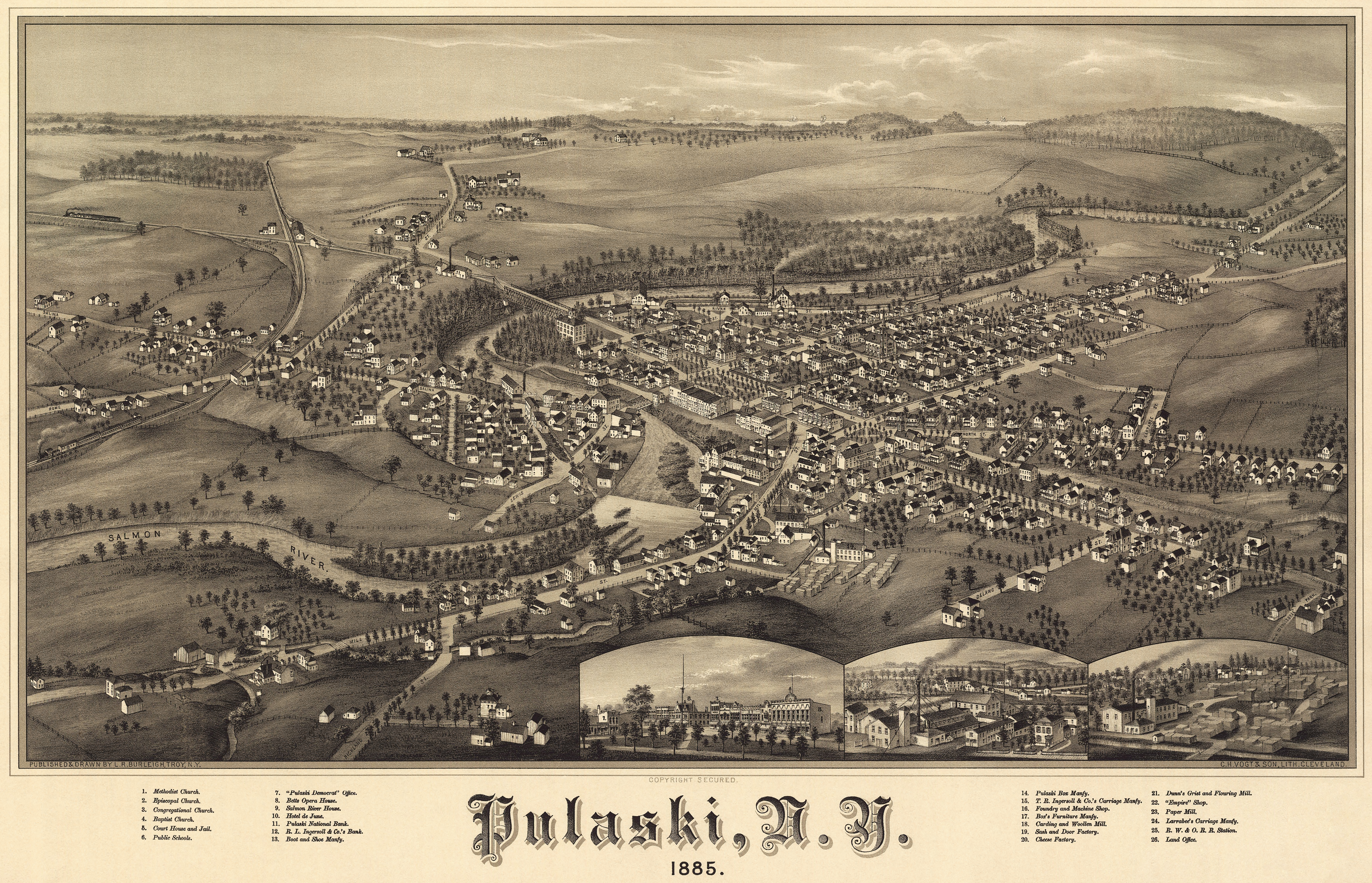
Perspective map and list of landmarks from 1885 by L.R. Burleigh

Mary Parker, the local historian, offered two possible theories regarding the selection of the town's name in an article titled "Name Selection is a Mystery." According to Parker, the most credible theory is that in 1829, three years before the town's incorporation, the prominent lawyer and abolitionist Thomas C. Baker proposed the name at a meeting. Another story indicates that the name was chosen when Revolutionary War heroes put names in a hat and pulled the name of Casimir Pulaski. As Mary Parker says, one or both may not be true but local historians are researching how the name was picked.

In October 1816 the first court of Oswego County was held in Oswego, when a number of people presented themselves and were admitted to the bar, thus being the only business transacted. However, in February 1817 the first jury was selected for court was convened in Pulaski. It was only three years after the first court was held in Oswego County was there a court house erected in Pulaski.

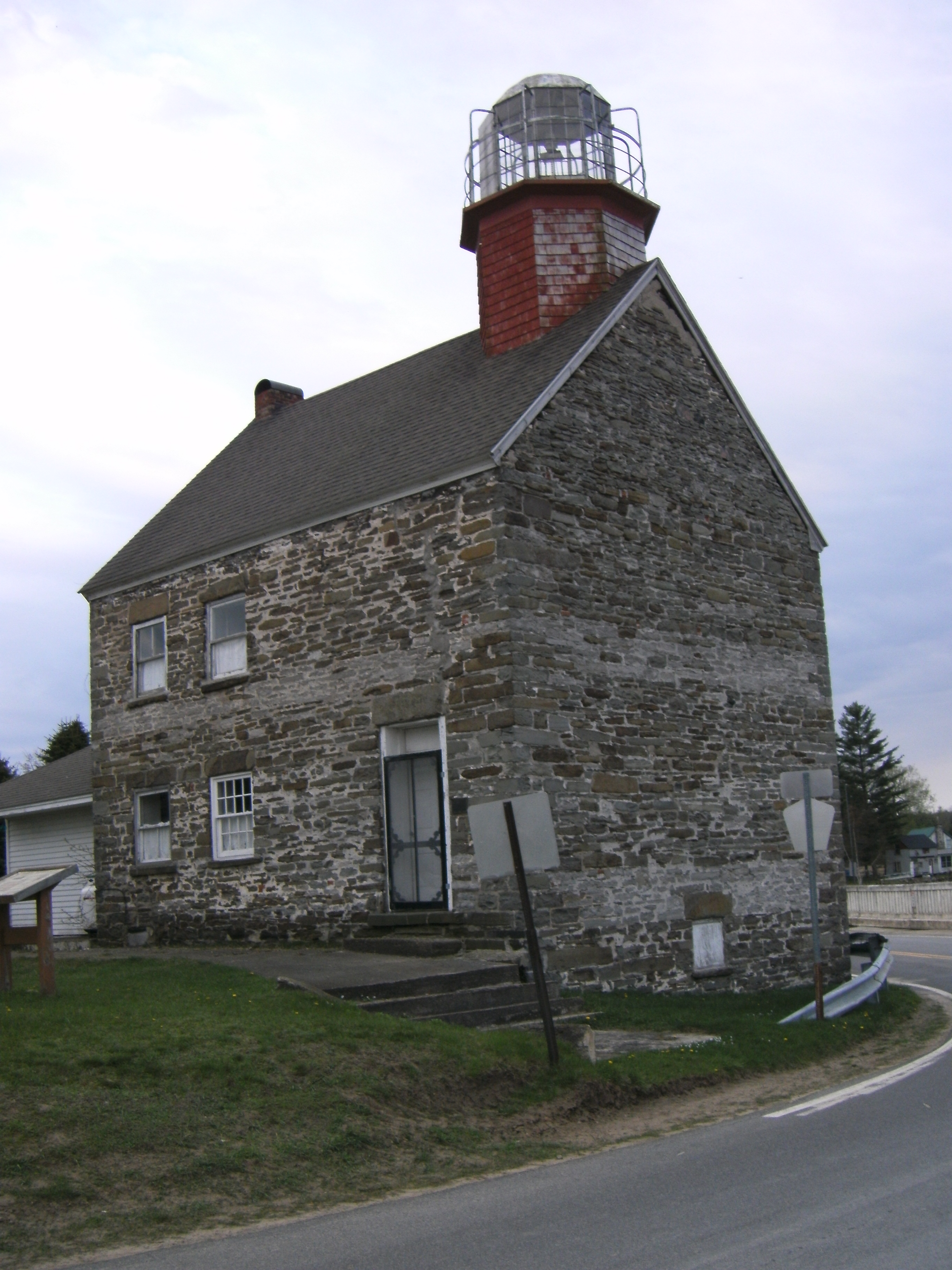
Selkirk Lighthouse

A few miles to the west from the village of Pulaski at the mouth of the Salmon River a lighthouse was built. In the 1830s the government engineers determined that the mouth had sufficient depth that it could harbor thirty ships. So in August 1838 the lighthouse was inaugurated. The lamp originally ran on whale oil. The harbor was deactivated in 1858. In 1989 a Coast Guard Class II navigation aid was installed. It was placed on the National Register of Historic Places in March 1979.

"In 1853 the citizens of the village became interested in the education of their children and youth. An act of legislature was passed to consolidate parts of three school districts within the village into one". It was called the "Pulaski school district" and the school was named “Pulaski Academy”. Pulaski Academy and Central Schools currently occupy two buildings: Lura Sharp Elementary School (built in 1939 and originally housed grades K-12 until 1969) and the Pulaski Middle-Senior High School (built in 1969, originally housing grades 7-12 as Pulaski Jr.-Sr. High School, grade 6 was moved into the facility in 2007). Other elementary school buildings in the hamlets of Richland and Fernwood were closed in the late 1960s or early 1970s, with the Richland school being used as the Headquarters of the Half-Shire Historical Society since 1973.

In the early hours of October 6, 1881, in a bakery in the back of M.L. Hollis store a fire started. In just over three hours the whole business portion of Pulaski was destroyed by the fire. The reason it took so little time to burn was because of the buildings structure being built of wood and the fire stations facilities inability to hold the fire in check.

From the 1840s to the present there have been many factories located in and around the village. With the village lying on the banks of the Salmon River it was a major asset in its development. "There have been at least hundred and twenty factories" come and go. From wood mills to iron works, there have been many different factories located in Pulaski. Only a small number of industrial companies now remain, including Fulton Companies, HealthWay, and Schoeller Technical Paper.

The Pulaski Village Historic District and Selkirk Lighthouse are listed on the National Register of Historic Places.

== Geography ==
=== Climate ===
Climate data for Pulaski, New York, 1991–2020 normals, extremes 1948–present: 399ft (122m)
| Month | Jan | Feb | Mar | Apr | May | Jun | Jul | Aug | Sep | Oct | Nov | Dec | Year |
|---|---|---|---|---|---|---|---|---|---|---|---|---|---|
| Record high °F (°C) | 64 (18) | 65 (18) | 79 (26) | 88 (31) | 90 (32) | 92 (33) | 97 (36) | 96 (36) | 93 (34) | 87 (31) | 78 (26) | 66 (19) | 97 (36) |
| Mean daily maximum °F (°C) | 28.7 (−1.8) | 30.5 (−0.8) | 38.5 (3.6) | 51.4 (10.8) | 64.6 (18.1) | 73.1 (22.8) | 78.5 (25.8) | 77.2 (25.1) | 70.7 (21.5) | 57.9 (14.4) | 45.7 (7.6) | 34.3 (1.3) | 54.3 (12.4) |
| Daily mean °F (°C) | 19.9 (−6.7) | 21.9 (−5.6) | 29.0 (−1.7) | 41.5 (5.3) | 53.5 (11.9) | 62.8 (17.1) | 67.9 (19.9) | 66.7 (19.3) | 59.5 (15.3) | 48.8 (9.3) | 37.7 (3.2) | 26.7 (−2.9) | 44.7 (7.0) |
| Mean daily minimum °F (°C) | 11.0 (−11.7) | 13.3 (−10.4) | 19.5 (−6.9) | 31.5 (−0.3) | 42.3 (5.7) | 52.4 (11.3) | 57.2 (14.0) | 56.2 (13.4) | 48.2 (9.0) | 39.6 (4.2) | 29.6 (−1.3) | 19.0 (−7.2) | 35.0 (1.7) |
| Record low °F (°C) | −29 (−34) | −37 (−38) | −12 (−24) | 3 (−16) | 23 (−5) | 30 (−1) | 40 (4) | 35 (2) | 22 (−6) | 20 (−7) | −5 (−21) | −24 (−31) | −37 (−38) |
| Average precipitation inches (mm) | 4.15 (105) | 3.31 (84) | 3.01 (76) | 3.90 (99) | 3.93 (100) | 3.83 (97) | 3.67 (93) | 4.52 (115) | 4.00 (102) | 5.14 (131) | 4.14 (105) | 4.44 (113) | 48.04 (1,220) |
Source 1: NOAA
Source 2: XMACIS2

== Demographics ==
Historical population
| Census | Pop. | Note | %± |
|---|---|---|---|
| 1880 | 1,501 | | — |
| 1890 | 1,517 | | 1.1% |
| 1900 | 1,493 | | −1.6% |
| 1910 | 1,788 | | 19.8% |
| 1920 | 1,895 | | 6.0% |
| 1930 | 2,046 | | 8.0% |
| 1940 | 1,895 | | −7.4% |
| 1950 | 2,033 | | 7.3% |
| 1960 | 2,246 | | 10.5% |
| 1970 | 2,480 | | 10.4% |
| 1980 | 2,415 | | −2.6% |
| 1990 | 2,525 | | 4.6% |
| 2000 | 2,398 | | −5.0% |
| 2010 | 2,365 | | −1.4% |
| 2020 | 2,186 | | −7.6% |
U.S. Decennial Census

As of the census of 2000, there were 2,398 people, 1,034 households, and 585 families residing in the village. The population density was 729.4 inhabitants per square mile (281.6/km^{2}). There were 1,155 housing units at an average density of 351.3 per square mile (135.6/km^{2}). The racial makeup of the village was 98.21% White, 0.91% African American, 0.01% Native American, 0.09% Asian, and 0.00% from two or more races. Hispanic or Latino of any race were 0.00% of the population.

There were 1,034 households, out of which 29.5% had children under the age of 18 living with them, 40.1% were married couples living together, 12.3% had a female householder with no husband present, and 43.4% were non-families. 37.1% of all households were made up of individuals, and 20.4% had someone living alone who was 65 years of age or older. The average household size was 2.30 and the average family size was 3.05.

In the village, the population was spread out, with 25.3% under the age of 18, 8.0% from 18 to 24, 27.1% from 25 to 44, 21.4% from 45 to 64, and 18.1% who were 65 years of age or older. The median age was 38 years. For every 100 females, there were 87.3 males. For every 100 females age 18 and over, there were 81.5 males.

The median income for a household in the village was $28,977, and the median income for a family was $40,089. Males had a median income of $34,850 versus $23,913 for females. The per capita income for the village was $16,458. About 12.1% of families and 15.6% of the population were below the poverty line, including 19.8% of those under age 18 and 18.7% of those age 65 or over.

== Transportation ==
Nearby I-81 allows local residents access to the nearby cities of Syracuse and Watertown. This proximity promotes the Pulaski area as a primary access point for the Lake Ontario and Tug Hill recreational tourism. Pulaski is served by Trailways Bus Lines as well as three Oswego County Public Transit Lines.

== Commerce ==
Commerce in Pulaski revolves heavily around fishing tourism. It is located on the Salmon River, which is named for the salmon which return to the river each fall during the salmon run. The area is a major draw for sportfishing, as is Lake Ontario, the shore of which is three miles to the west of the village. Fishermen and women can find a fishing report to get a good idea the best time is to hit the steams. The fishing season culminates in the fall with the Salmon River Festival, held each year at the site of the farmers' market. Dan Briggs, mayor of Pulaski in 1987, said that "our community cash flow ranges between $3 to $5 million a year just in the village because of salmon season".

Pulaski is also located on an extensive snowmobile trail system which connects to other trail systems throughout central and northern New York. This results in a growing amount of winter tourism as the trail system grows in reputation; this is helped by the reliable snowfall in the area, particularly throughout the Tug Hill region.

Summer tourism is also strong in the Pulaski area because of its proximity to Lake Ontario and its numerous seasonal activities which include white water rafting, residences, parks, and resorts where thousands of people around NY camp every year. However, the town lost some of its touristic luster with the loss of their 'Ringgold Fireman's Field Days' that occurred annually on the first weekend of August.

== See also ==
- Michael Atkinson (inspector general)
- John H. Emerick
