= Chancellor (tugboat) =

- U.S. National Register of Historic Places
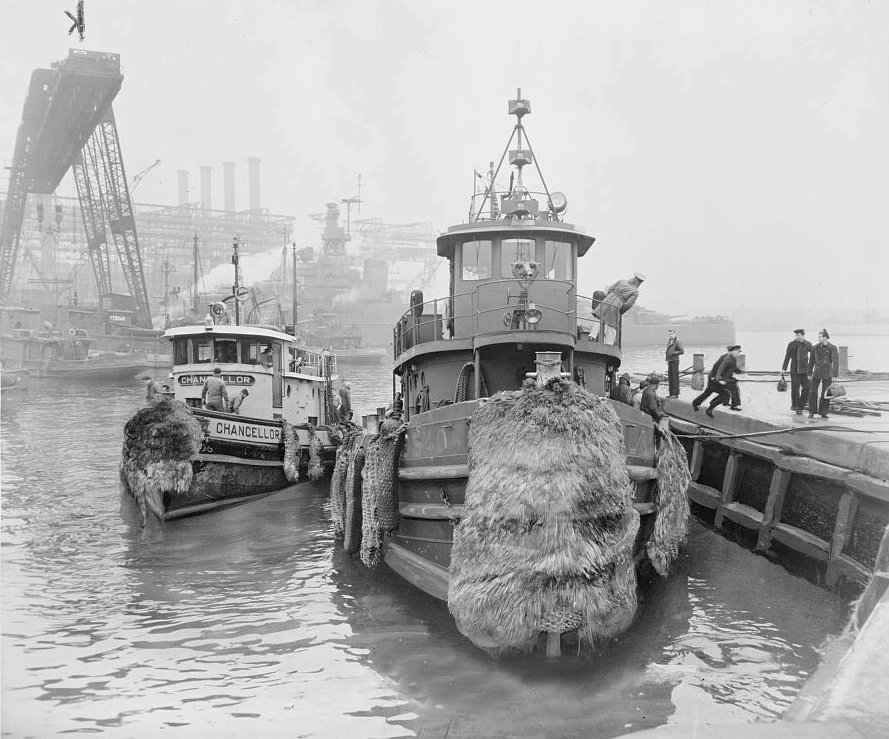
- Chancellor (left) with the USS Quileute

- Location within New York Location within the United States
- Location: Lock 3, Erie Canal, Waterford, New York
- Coordinates: 42°47′44.5″N 73°41′15.6″W
- Area: 0.9 acres (0.36 ha)
- Built: 1938
- Architect: Bushey, Ira S., & Sons, Brooklyn NY
- Architectural style: Canal Tugboat
- NRHP reference No.: 00000050
- Added to NRHP: February 18, 2000

Chancellor was a historic canal tugboat located at Waterford, New York. It was built in 1938 by the Ira S. Bushey & Sons Shipyard of Brooklyn, New York. She measured 76.7 ft (23.4 m) in length, 21 ft (6.4 m) in beam, and 9.3 ft (2.8 m) depth of hold. She was designed for use on the New York State Barge Canal.

It was listed on the National Register of Historic Places in 2000.

Chancellor was owned and operated by the Waterford Maritime Historical Society, based in Waterford, New York. In 2017 she took on water and sunk up to her wheelhouse, leaving her future in limbo. Chancellor was sold at auction in 2021, and in 2023 she was scrapped.
