= United States Post Office (Fulton, New York) =

- US Post Office-Fulton
- U.S. National Register of Historic Places
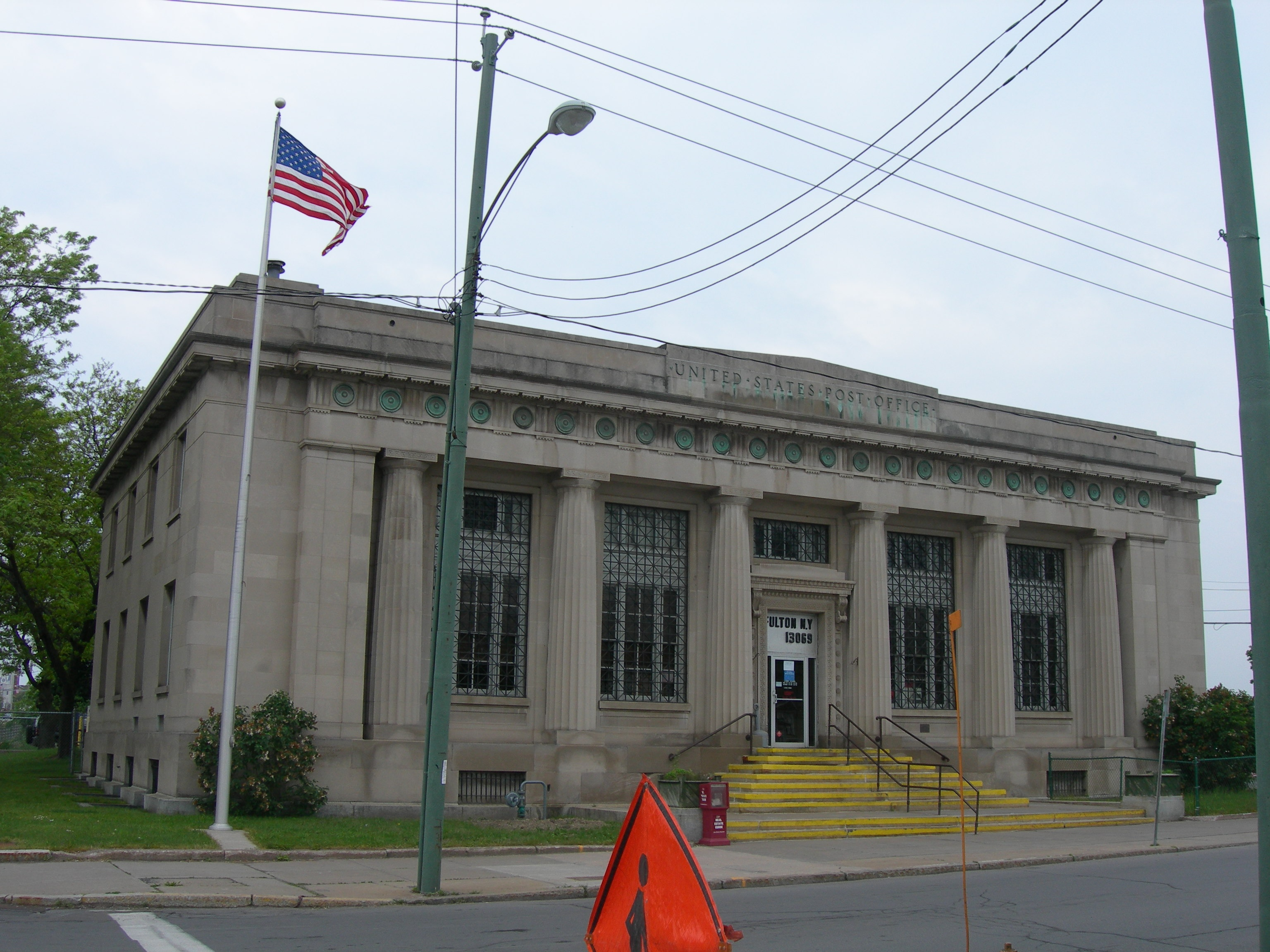

- Location within New York Location within the United States
- Interactive map showing the location for U.S. Post Office-Oswego
- Location: 214 S. First St., Fulton, New York
- Coordinates: 43°19′3″N 76°24′53″W
- Area: less than one acre
- Built: 1912
- Architect: Taylor, James Knox; Rohland, Caroline S.
- Architectural style: Greek Revival
- MPS: US Post Offices in New York State, 1858-1943, TR
- NRHP reference No.: 88002519
- Added to NRHP: May 11, 1989

US Post Office-Fulton is a historic post office building located at Fulton in Oswego County, New York. It was built in 1912-1915 and enlarged in 1936–1938. It is one of a number of post offices in New York State designed by the Office of the Supervising Architect of the Treasury Department, James Knox Taylor. It is a two-story building with a limestone facade that contains a six-part colonnade with attached Doric order columns set in antis between Doric piers in the Greek Revival style. The lobby features a mural by Caroline S. Rohland in 1942 titled "Father LeMoyne Trying to Convert the Indians on Pathfinder Island."

It was listed on the National Register of Historic Places in 1989.
