= Fulton Public Library =

- U.S. National Register of Historic Places
- Location within New York Location within the United States
- Location: 160 S. First St., Fulton, New York
- Coordinates: 43°19′10″N 76°24′59″W
- Area: less than one acre
- Built: 1905
- Architect: Revels, Frederick William; Hallenbeck, Earl, et al.
- Architectural style: Beaux Arts
- NRHP reference No.: 98001616
- Added to NRHP: January 15, 1999

Fulton Public Library is a historic library building located at Fulton in Oswego County, New York. It is a masonry structure built in 1905–1906 in the Beaux-Arts style. The building is built on a steeply sloped lot and is two stories at street level and four stories behind. It was designed and built with funds provided by the philanthropist Andrew Carnegie. It is one of 3,000 such libraries constructed between 1885 and 1919, and one of 107 in New York State. Carnegie provided $15,000 toward the construction of the Fulton library.

It was listed on the National Register of Historic Places in 1999.
