= Dexterville, New York =

- hamlet
- Location within New York
- Coordinates: 43°19′24″N 76°30′03″W
- Country: United States
- State: New York
- County: Oswego
- Elevation: 469 ft (143 m)
- Time zone: UTC-5 (Eastern (EST))
  - Summer (DST): UTC-4 (EDT)
- Area code: 315
- GNIS feature ID: 948400

Dexterville is a hamlet in the town of Granby, Oswego County, New York, United States.
