= State Street Methodist Episcopal Church =

Historic church in New York, United States

- U.S. National Register of Historic Places
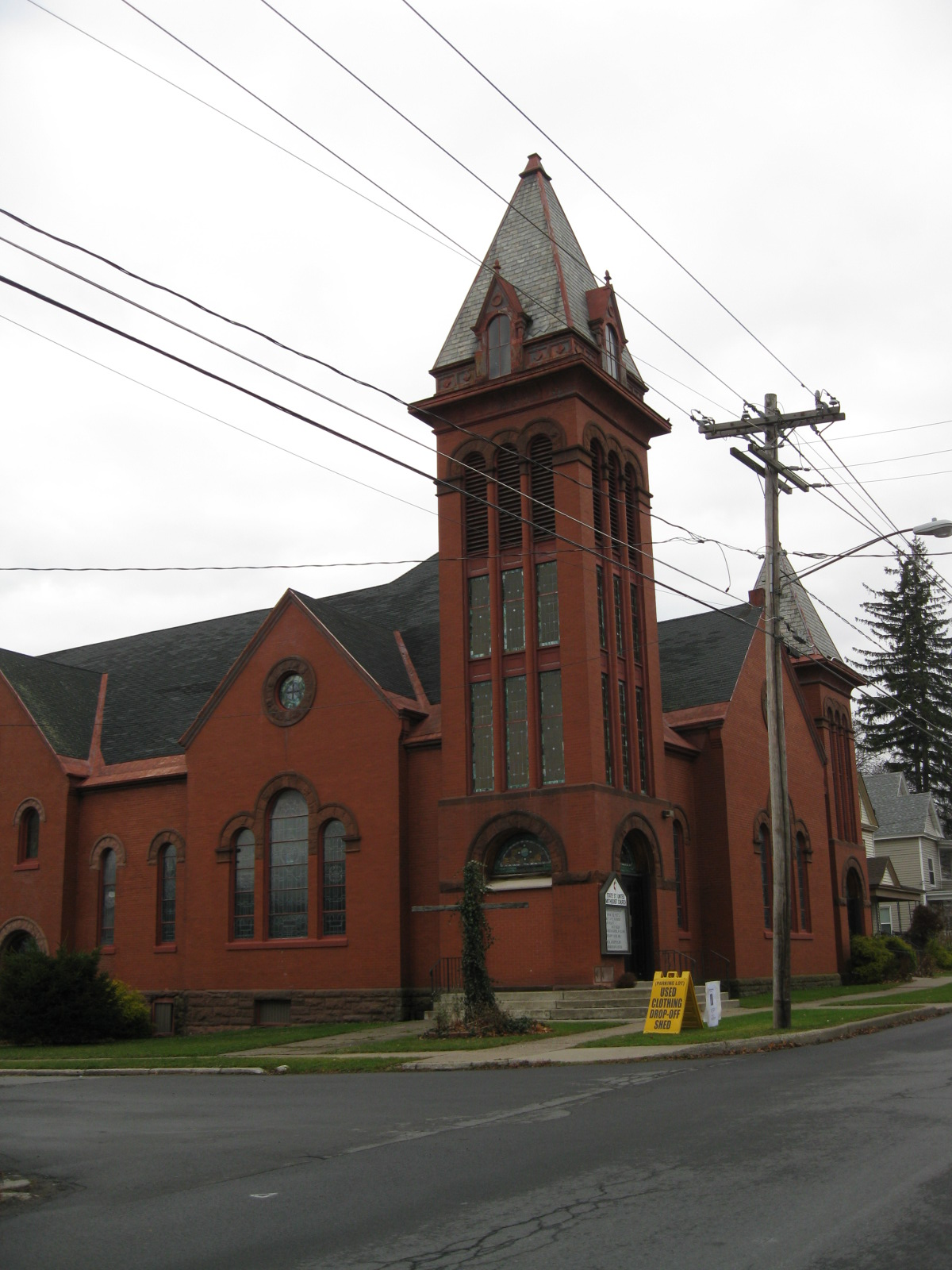
- State Street Methodist Episcopal Church, November 2009

- Location within New York Location within the United States
- Location: 357 State St., Fulton, New York
- Coordinates: 43°19′06″N 76°24′35″W
- Area: Less than 1 acre (0.40 ha)
- Built: 1894, 1900, 1901, 1906, 1962
- Architect: Seeber, JH
- Architectural style: Romanesque
- NRHP reference No.: 13000030
- Added to NRHP: February 20, 2013

State Street Methodist Episcopal Church, now known as State Street United Methodist Church, is a historic Methodist Episcopal church located at Fulton in Oswego County, New York. The original section was built in 1894, and expanded in 1900 with the addition of an auditorium in the Akron Plan. It consists of a one-story auditorium with 1 1/2-story education. A basement was added in 1906, and two-story wing in 1962. The church is constructed of red brick and is in the Romanesque style. It has a slate cross-gable roof and two asymmetrical towers. The larger bell tower is four stories tall and contains two levels of stained glass windows.

It was listed on the National Register of Historic Places in 2013.
