= USS Quileute =

Tugboat of the United States Navy

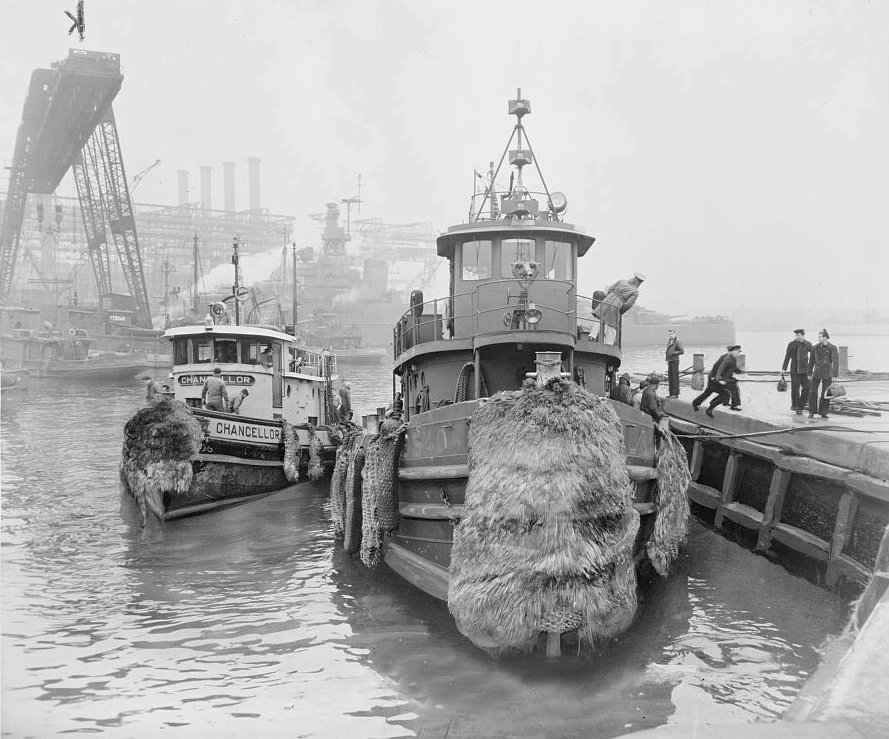
- USS Quileute (right) with the civilian tug Chancellor at the New York Navy Yard in Brooklyn, New York, in 1946.

History

United States
- Name: USS Quileute
- Namesake: The Quileute, a Native American people from western Washington
- Builder: Consolidated Shipbuilding Corporation, Morris Heights, the Bronx, New York
- Laid down: 17 February 1945
- Launched: 14 May 1945
- In service: 16 October 1945
- Reclassified: From large harbor tug (YTB-540) to medium harbor tug (YTM-540) in February 1962
- Identification: IMO number: 8654297; MMSI number: 366969470; Callsign: WCC9851
- Fate: Sold for scrapping 1 March 1974

General characteristics
- Class & type: Hisada-class harbor tug
- Displacement: 310 tons (full)
- Length: 101 ft 0 in (30.78 m)
- Beam: 28 ft 0 in (8.53 m)
- Draft: 11 ft 0 in (3.35 m)
- Propulsion: Diesel engine, one shaft
- Speed: 12 knots
- Complement: 10
- Armament: 2 x .50-caliber (12.7-millimeter) machine guns

USS Quileute (YTB–540), later YTM-540, was a United States Navy harbor tug in service from 1945 to ca. 1974.

Quileute was laid down 17 February 1945 by the Consolidated Shipbuilding Corporation at Morris Heights, the Bronx, New York, and launched on 14 May 1945. She was placed in service on 16 October 1945 with the 3rd Naval District at New York City as the large harbor tug USS Quileute (YTB-540).

Quileute began active duty for the 1st Naval District at Boston, Massachusetts, in March 1946. In February 1962, she was reclassified as a medium harbor tug and redesignated YTM–540. She remained active with the 1st Naval District into at least 1970.

[1970-1974]

Quileute was sold for scrapping on 1 March 1974.
