= John Van Buren Tavern =

Historic commercial building in New York, United States

- U.S. National Register of Historic Places
- Location within New York Location within the United States
- Nearest city: Fulton, New York
- Coordinates: 43°21′35″N 76°25′45″W
- Area: 6.5 acres (2.6 ha)
- Built: ca. 1800
- Architectural style: Greek Revival, Federal
- NRHP reference No.: 88002377
- Added to NRHP: November 3, 1988

John Van Buren Tavern is a historic inn and tavern building located near Fulton in Oswego County, New York. It is a 2 1/2-story, three-by-five-bay, brick building with a side-gable roof. It was built sometime between 1800 and 1821 and operated as a tavern into the 1860s, when it was converted to a residence. Also on the property are a contributing smokehouse and house lived in while the tavern was under construction.

It was listed on the National Register of Historic Places in 1988.
