= Gertrude Tiemer =

American painter and photographer

Gertrude Tiemer Wille (March 4, 1897 – March 20, 1967) was an American painter, photographer, and poet. Tiemer achieved her greatest notoriety for inter-dimensional, multi-exposure photography. Her paintings of landscapes, still lifes, portraits, and other pieces adopted both the realist and abstract styles of art. Tiemer exhibited her work at galleries in Maine, New York City, and other venues throughout the U.S. and internationally.

== Early life and education ==
Tiemer was born to Paul Tiemer and Carrie Freeman Tiemer in East Orange, New Jersey in 1897. She graduated from the Beard School (now Morristown-Beard School) in Orange, New Jersey in 1915. During her studies at the school, she captured a photograph that made the Roll of Honor of St. Nicholas Magazine, a children's magazine, in 1913. She also had a drawing on the Roll of Honor of the magazine.

After high school, Tiemer studied at the Art Students League of New York, and she took art classes in Rome, Italy. While living in Italy, Tiemer owned a studio in Anticoli Corrado, a hill village populated by artists. She studied under Maurice Sterne, a noted Latvian American sculptor and painter. The Archives of American Art at the Smithsonian includes a photo of Sterne and his students, including Tiemer. She also studied under artist Marsden Hartley, who painted using the American Modernist style. The Marsden Hartley Memorial Collection at Bates College in Lewiston, Maine includes his correspondence with Tiemer and writer Gertrude Stein.

== Art exhibitions and poetry readings ==
Tiemer exhibited her artwork at galleries throughout Maine. She exhibited at the Bowdoin College Museum of Art in 1943 and at the L. D. M. Sweat Memorial Galleries at the Portland Museum of Art in Portland, Maine in 1949. Tiemer also showcased her work throughout the New York City metropolitan area. In 1927, she exhibited at a Whitney Studio Club, an exhibit space for emerging and avant-garde artists run by Gertrude Vanderbilt Whitney. Tiemer exhibited at the Salons of America's show at the American Art Association - Anderson Galleries in New York City in 1931. Her 1939 exhibit at the American Women's Association at West 57th Street in Manhattan showed her paintings of chrysanthemums. Tiemer also exhibited at the National Arts Club in Gramercy Park.

In 1940, Tiemer's sonnet "October Rose" won first prize in a poetry contest sponsored by the Manor Club in Pelham, New York. Her poem titled "Plum Tree" earned an honorable mention in the contest. Tiemer won second prize and earned four honorable mentions at the Manor club's 1939 literary contest. Founded as a men's club, the Manor Club is the oldest women's cultural club in Westchester County, New York. During the 1950s, Tiemer published her poetry in Voices: A Journal of Poetry.

== Collections with her work ==
Tiemer's photograph titled "Summer's Child" appears in a photography collection at the Metropolitan Museum of Art in New York City. Taken on a beach, the chromogenic print depicts her granddaughter, Karen Adams. The museum purchased the photograph in 1962 through funds in the bequest of Joseph Pulitzer. Smithsonian American Art Museum in Washington, D.C. contains a folder of Tiemer's work. The Stephen Merrill Photograph Collection at Bowdoin College contains a photograph of her taken at Cundy's Harbor in Harpswell, Maine.

== Island home at Gabriel ==
Tiemer spent her winters in New York City and her summers at the family home called Gabriel on Dingley Island. Located in the Casco Bay, Dingley Island sits off the coast of Maine near Brunswick. While visiting Maine for a birthday party, Tiemer had happened upon the property just as the previous owner put it up for sale. She bid for the house that day and received ownership only 10 minutes after placing her bid. The home's namesake of Gabriel came from a wooden weathervane from the late 18th Century that adorned its stables.

During her time on the island, Tiemer collected driftwood (that she termed sea-scoured wood and tidewood) and painted it using an abstract style. She created a collection of painted wood from the sea called Sea Formed Symbolism.

== Family ==
Tiemer married Frederick Willie in 1915. He ran the New York City office of the Saturday Evening Post, a bimonthly magazine. Tiemer and Frederick Willie had a daughter named Erica.
