= Paul Rohland =

Woodstock artist Paul Rohland

Paul Herman Rohland
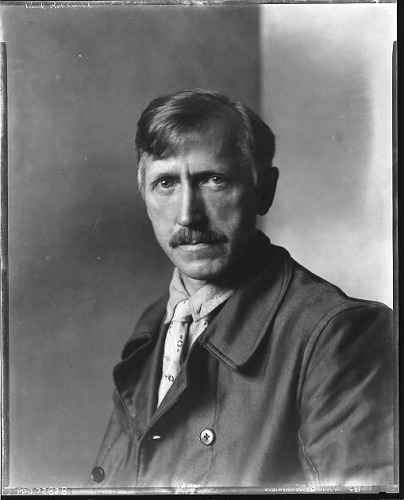
- Paul Herman Rohland
- Born: March 11, 1884; Richmond, Virginia, U.S.
- Died: September 29, 1949 (aged 65); Los Angeles, California, U.S.
- Known for: Artist; muralist; engraver; Woodstock Art Colony
- Style: Representationalism; regionalism
- Spouse: Caroline Speare Rohland

Paul Herman Rohland (March 11, 1884 – September 29, 1949) was an American artist, printmaker, watercolorist, and muralist. He exhibited in the Armory Show of 1913 in New York City. Among others, his work is in the permanent collections of the Whitney Museum of American Art, the Barnes Foundation, National Museum of American Art-Smithsonian, the New Mexico Museum of Fine Arts, and the Woodstock Artists Association and Museum. He painted three post office murals for the Section of Painting and Sculpture.

== Early life and career ==
Born March 11, 1884, in Richmond, Virginia, Rohland was the fourth of seven sons of Clara Marie (née Thilow) and Otto Friedrich Rohland. At the age of 14 he went to work as a photo engraver for the Christopher Engraving Company in Richmond. He studied in evening art classes at the Virginia Mechanics Institute under the painter and illustrator Wm. L. Sheppard, and the artist and lithographer, Richard A. Duckhardt. In 1900 his family moved to Philadelphia where he worked as a copper etcher for Beck's Engraving. From 1902 to 1906, he lived in New York and continued his evening art studies under Robert Henri at the New York School of Art and at the Art Students League, where he won a prize in the League's "Fakir's Exhibition." Then, with an aunt's financial help, he was able to complete several years of formal art studies in France.

Returning to New York in 1909, he studied illustration under Edward Dufner at the League, and took classes with Henri at the Lincoln Arcade. He also took landscape painting with Birge Harrison at the Art Students League's summer school in the Woodstock, NY, art colony founded in 1902 by Ralph Radcliffe Whitehead, Hervey White, and Bolton Brown. Twenty-four artists associated with the colony exhibited in the legendary Armory Show of 1913, which featured 1,300 works of art. Rohland entered three paintings and sold one. Later that year, Rohland showed his work at the MacDowell Club of New York and the Carnegie Institute International Exhibition. In 1919 he married Caroline Speare, a Woodstock colleague and fellow participant in the colony's lively Maverick Festivals. The couple maintained a home and a large, impressive garden in Woodstock where they grew the flowers that Rohland used in his floral oils and watercolors.

In search of subjects for their art work, the couple often traveled to Europe, Puerto Rico, and southern and western states. They lived in New York City for short periods, but Woodstock remained their major residence for many years. There, Peter A. Juley & Son included both of them in their photographic documentation of early 20th-century American painters. The Rohlands' careers were linked until their marriage ended with his death in 1949.

== Style ==
Like other art colonies, Woodstock fostered artistic camaraderie. Throughout Rohland's life, the colony's artists and artist couples, Andrew Dasburg and his wife, Grace Mott Johnson, Florence and Konrad Cramer, Henry McFee, Emil Ganso, Peggy Bacon, Eugene and Elsie Speicher, and many others were among their close and instructive friends. In 1920, when Speicher took Albert C. Barnes, founder of the Barnes Foundation, on a tour of Woodtock artists' studios, Barnes bought five of Rohland's monotypes. Barnes later wrote Rohland, saying the works "successfully competed in cheerfulness and charm with a bright, crisp day.

By the early 1920's, Rohland, like other Woodstock artists, was depicting the local landscape in heavy brushstrokes and earthy tones, which some newspaper reviews called "modernism." However, Rohland's watercolors remained bright and fluid. Local landscape painter and art writer, Jean-Paul Slusser, wrote of Rohland's floral oils and watercolors, "only a temperament as native to the sun and the soil as the flowers themselves could have produced them." Printmaking was a signature art form in Woodstock. Rohland contributed prints to Hervey White's publication, The Plowshare, as well as to Woodstock's satirical publication, Hue and Cry.

== Later career and legacy ==
Rohland exhibited regularly with the Woodstock Artists Association, Society of Independent Artists, Salons of America, the Carnegie Institute, and the Corcoran Gallery of Art. He also had one-man shows, notably in 1939 at the Virginia Museum of Fine Art. When Rohland traveled for his work, Juliana Force, who would become the first director of the new Whitney Museum of American Art, sometimes handled his exhibitions and sales through the Whitney Studio Club and Whitney Gallery, where Rohland began exhibiting in 1927. He showed at the Whitney Museum's first Biennial in 1932. He continued to participate in Whitney Museum exhibitions through 1942.

The Great Depression severely affected his art sales, but Rohland managed to secure three commissions from the Treasury Department's Section of Fine Arts for post office murals. He executed The Union of the Mountains, for Mount Union, PA, (1937); Dogwood and Azaleas, for Decatur, GA (1938); and Louisiana Bayou, for Ville Platte, LA (1939).

In 1942, Rohland's chronic asthma worsened, and the couple packed up their Ford Model A and left Woodstock, traveling south to Washington, DC, with their final destination Santa Fe, New Mexico, where Woodstock artist Andrew Dasburg was active. From 1942 to 1945, Rohland exhibited yearly in the annual exhibition of Painters and Sculptors of the Southwest; hence, he is often considered a "western" artist. In El Palacio, August 1943, Alfred Morang remarked that Rohland's watercolor, Southern Mansion, "possesses solidity beneath the flickering splashes of color. The drawing is in accord with the short-hand nature of this most difficult of mediums."

In 1945, finding Santa Fe too cold, Rohland and his wife moved to Sierra Madre, CA, where he painted mountain landscapes and worked on his engravings. Rohland died in Los Angeles, September 29, 1949. Many references erroneously give his death date as 1953.

== Sources ==
- Archives of American Art. Konrad and Florence Ballin Cramer Papers 1897-1968, Series 2 Correspondence 1900-1964.
- Arts, The. June, 1928, Paul Rohland by Jean Paul Slusser, Woodstock Artists Association Archives, Woodstock, NY.
- American Paintings and Works on Paper in the Barnes Foundation. Barnes Foundation, 2010, Merion, PA. ISBN 978-0-300-15877-9.
- Archives of American Art. Smithsonian Institution.
- Berman, Avis. The Rebels on Eighth Street, Juliana Force and the Whitney Museum of American Art. Atheneum, 1990, New York. ISBN 0-689-12086-9.
- Brooklyn Daily Eagle. “Woodstock Art Colony Synonymous with Modernism,” Sunday, March 4, 1923, p. 26, Newspapers.com. Retrieved March 26, 2020.
- Brown, Milton W. The Story of the Armory Show. Joseph Hirschhorn Foundation, 1988, New York. LCCN: 63-13496.
- California Death Index. 1940-1997, Ancestry.com.
- El Palacio Catalogues. (1941-1945) School of American Research, Museum of New Mexico.
- Evers, Alf. Woodstock, History of an American Town. Overlook Press, Woodstock, New York, 1987. ISBN 0-87951-983-5.
- Falk, Peter Hastings. Annual and Biennial Exhibition Record of the Whitney Museum of American Art, 1918—1989 Sound View Press, Madison, Connecticut, 1991.
- Hewett, Edgar L. "Background of the Exhibition," El Palacio, Vol. I, No. 8, August 1943.
- Homer, William Innes. Robert Henri and His Circle. Cornell University Press, Inc., Ithaca and London, 1969. LCCN: 75-81594.
- Juley, Peter A., and Son Collection Smithsonian American Art Museum, Washington, DC..
- The Armory Show at 100, Modernism and Revolution. New York Historical Society, New York, 2013. ISBN 978-0-916141-26-4. Rohland listed on p. 457.
- Marling, Karal A. Woodstock, an American Art Colony. Vassar College Art Gallery, January 23 – March 4, 1977, Hamilton Reproductions, Poughkeepsie, NY, LCCN: 76-54371.
- Marlor, Clark S. The Salons of America, 1922-1936. Sound View Press, 1985.
- Marlor, Clark S. The Society of Independent Artists: The Exhibition Record, 1917-1944, Noyes Press, Park Ridge, NJ, 1984. ISBN 0-8155-5063-4.
- New York Times. "Art Notes," Wednesday, November 19, 1913, p. 9, Newspapers.com. Retrieved March 26, 2020.
- New York Times. "Fakir's Picture Show Open to Public To-Day," Tuesday, April 17, 1906, p. 6, Newspapers.com. Retrieved April 1, 2020.
- Park, Marlene, and Gerald Markowitz. New Deal for Art. Gallery Association of New York State, Inc., New York, 1977. LCCN: 76-531-59.
- Park, Marlene and Gerald Markowitz. Democratic Vistas, PO and Public Art in the New Deal. Temple University Press, Philadelphia, 1984. ISBN 0-87722-348-3.
- Perlman, Bennard. Robert Henri, His Life and His Art. Dover Publications, New York, 1991 ISBN 0-486-26722-9.
- Richmond Times Dispatch. "The Arts," "Museum to hold preview of Rohland's One-Man Show," Friday, January 20, 1939, p. 16. Newspapers.com. Retrieved March 26, 2020.
- Record of the Carnegie Institute's International Exhibitions 1896-1996. Sound View Press, Madison, CT, 1998.
- Santa Fe New Mexican. "Santa Fe Artist Dies on West Coast," Thursday, September 29, 1949. Newspapers.com. Retrieved March 26, 2020.
- Schack, William. Art and Argyrol. Sagamore Press, New York, 1960. LCCN: 60-6835.
- United States Census, 1900, Ancestry.com.
- Weber, Bruce. Woodstock Artists Association and Museum Lecture Series, Part II: The Woodstock Colony: The Nascent Years 1900-1930. June 1-September 7, 2020.
- Woodstock Artists Association. Woodstock's Art Heritage, The Permanent Collection of the Woodstock Artists Association. Historical Survey by Tom Wolf. Woodstock, New York: Overlook Press, 1987. ISBN 0-87951-294-6.
- Oral History contributed by Frank O. Rohland, nephew of the artist.
