= Oak Street School (Fulton, New York) =

- U.S. National Register of Historic Places
- Location within New York Location within the United States
- Location: 205 Oak St., Fulton, New York
- Coordinates: 43°18′43″N 76°25′7″W
- Area: 0.8 acres (0.32 ha)
- Built: 1913
- Architect: Platt, J. Mills
- Architectural style: Tudor Revival
- NRHP reference No.: 03000243
- Added to NRHP: July 03, 2003

Oak Street School is a historic school building located at Fulton in Oswego County, New York. It is a rectangular red brick structure, trimmed in cast stone and built in 1913–1914. It is a two-story building over a high brick basement. It ceased being used as a school in 1991. It has since been retrofitted into small apartments used primarily by senior residents of the city.

It was listed on the National Register of Historic Places in 2003.
