= Fulton City School District =

School district in New York, United States

Fulton City Schools

Location
- Fulton, Oswego County, New York United States

District information
- Grades: K-12
- Superintendent: Brian Pulvino

Students and staff
- Athletic conference: Section III
- District mascot: Red Dragons
- Colors: Red, White and Green

Other information
- Website: Fulton City School District

Fulton City School District is a school district in Fulton, New York, United States. The district operates six schools: G. Ray Bodley High School, Fulton Junior High, Fairgrieve Elementary, Granby Elementary, Lanigan Elementary, and Volney Elementary.

== Administration ==
The District offices are located 167 South Fourth Street. The current Superintendent is Brian Pulvino.

=== Administrators ===
- Brian Pulvino–Superintendent
- Elizabeth Conners–Executive Director of Instruction and Assessment
- Kathy Nichols–Director of Finance
- Thomas Greer–Director of Personnel
- Christopher Ells–Director, Health, Physical Education and Athletics
- Gerald Seguin–Director of Facilities, Operations and Transportation
- Geri Geitner–Directory of Student Support Programs
- Katherine Adams–Director of Special Instructional Programs and Pupil Services (SIPPS)
- Dominick Lisi–Director of Technology
- Daniel Carroll–Director of Instructional Support Services
- Terry Warwick–Director of Food Services
- Carrie Waloven–Director of Literacy/Universal Pre-K

=== Board of education ===
- Robert Ireland – Vice President
- Robbin Griffin–President
- Brian Hotaling–Clerk
- Rae Howard
- Rosemary Occhocinco
- Daniel Pawlewicz
- Robert Somers

=== Selected Former Superintendents ===
Previous assignment and reason for departure denoted in parentheses

- Robert A. MacDonald–1954-1959 (Principal - Fulton High School, retired)
- Glenn W. Clark–1959-1976 (Principal - Fulton High School, retired)
- William H. Rasbek–1981-1988
- John Grant
- Michael J. Egan–1995-2005 (Assistant Superintendent for Curriculum & Instruction - Fulton City School District, retired)
- Michael A. Maroun–2005-2006

== G. Ray Bodley High School ==
G. Ray Bodley High School is located at 6 William Gillard Drive and serves grades 9 through 12. The current principal is Donna Parkhurst, one of the current vice principals is former professional wrestler Marc J. Copani.

=== History ===
==== Selected former principals ====
Previous assignment and reason for departure denoted within parentheses

1. Robert C. MacDonald–1929-1954 (Principal - Manlius High School, named Superintendent of Fulton City School District)
2. Glenn W. Clark–1954-1959 (Principal - Waddington High School, named Superintendent of Fulton City School District)
3. Carl F. Rowland–1959-1978 (Principal - J.R. Fairgrieve School, retired)
4. Joseph Campolietta–1979-1984 (Vice Principal - G. Ray Bodley High School, retired)
5. Michael J. Egan–1984-1992, 2008-2009 (Vice Principal - G. Ray Bodley, named Assistant Superintendent of Curriculum & Instruction of Fulton City Schools (1992), returned from retirement to serve interim appointment)
6. Martin L. Swenson
7. James G. Granozio–1992-Oct. 1994 (House Principal - Cicero-North Syracuse High School, resigned and placed on special assignment)
8. Allen Bilofsky–Oct. 1994-Jun. 1995 [interim] (Vice Principal - G. Ray Bodley High School, returned to VP duties)
9. Mary P. Kinsella–1995-1997 (Vice Principal - Pine Grove Junior High School, resigned)
10. Jackie Stewart–1997-2001 (Vice Principal - G. Ray Bodley High School, retired)
11. Patrick Dolan [interim]–2001–2003
12. Dennis P. Dumas–2003-2008 (Vice Principal - G. Ray Bodley High School, placed on special assignment and retired)
13. Brian Buchanan–2009-2012 (Principal - Willard Prior Elementary School, named Assistant Principal of G. Ray Bodley High School)

== Fulton Junior High ==
Fulton Junior High School is located at 129 Curtis Street and serves grades 7 and 8. The current principal is Marc Copani.

=== History ===
==== Selected former principals ====
1. Ryan Lanigan –?-2017
2. Mark Slosek–?-2007
3. Donna Parkhurst–2007-2011

== Fairgrieve Elementary ==
Fairgrieve Elementary School is located at 716 Academy Street and serves grades pre-K through 6. The current principal is Jean Ciesla.

=== Selected former principals ===
1. Fred Gibbons was first principal.
1. Carl Rowland–1955-1958
2. Grace C. Lynch (acting)–1955
3. Stanley Finkle

== Granby Elementary ==
Granby Elementary School is located at 400 West Seventh Street, North and serves grades K through 6. The current principal is Heather J. Perry.

=== Former principals ===
1. Janet Kimatian
2. Barbara Hubbard–?-2008

== Lanigan Elementary ==
J.E. Lanigan Elementary School is located at 59 Bakeman Street and serves grades K through 6. The current principal is Jeffrey Hendrickson.

Former principals

1. Gordon F. Chesbro
2. Dan Johnson
3. Floyd W. Wallace - 1971-2000
4. Elizabeth Conners–2000-2005
5. Terry Ward–2005-2008

== Volney Elementary ==
Volney Elementary School is located at 2592 State Route 3 and serves grades K through 6. The current principal is . Todd Terpening.

Former principals

1. Blayne Webb
2. Harold Waugh
3. Donna Parkhurst–?-2007
