= David Van Buren House =

Historic house in New York, United States

- U.S. National Register of Historic Places
- Location within New York Location within the United States
- Nearest city: Fulton, New York
- Coordinates: 43°21′37″N 76°25′45″W
- Area: 2.4 acres (0.97 ha)
- Built: 1847
- Architect: Parker, Gunred H.
- Architectural style: Greek Revival
- NRHP reference No.: 88000726
- Added to NRHP: June 09, 1988

David Van Buren House is a historic home located near Fulton in Oswego County, New York. It consists of a 1 1/2-story, five-by-three-bay, main block with a large 1-story rear wing in the Greek Revival style. The brick structure was constructed in 1847.

It was listed on the National Register of Historic Places in 1988.
