= Cynthia Volkert =

American-German nanoscientist

Cynthia Ann Volkert (born 1960) is a nanoscientist whose research focuses on the properties of nanoporous materials, particularly metals including gold, other nano-scale metals, and their machining and fabrication using focused ion beams, vapor deposition, and dealloying. Born in the US, and educated in Canada and the US, she works in Germany as professor and director of the Institute for Materials Physics of the University of Göttingen. She is a former president of the German Materials Society and of the Materials Research Society.

== Education and career ==
Volkert was born in 1960, in Williamsport, Pennsylvania. She studied physics at McGill University in Canada, graduating in 1982, and then went to Harvard University in the US for graduate study in physics. She earned a master's degree there in 1984, and completed her Ph.D. in 1987. Her dissertation, Flow and Relaxation of Amorphous Metals, was supervised by Frans Spaepen.

From 1988 until 1998 she worked in the US for Bell Labs. In 1999 she moved to the Max Planck Institute for Metals Research in Stuttgart (later part of the Max Planck Institute for Intelligent Systems), where she worked until 2002. Next, she became a researcher at Karlsruhe Research Center (now part of the Karlsruhe Institute of Technology), from 2003 to 2007. She took her current position as professor at the Institute for Materials Physics of the University of Göttingen in 2007.

In 2008, Volkert became president of the German Materials Society. In the same year she also became president of the Materials Research Society.

== Recognition ==
Volkert was elected to the German National Academy of Sciences Leopoldina in 2011.
