= Volkert Van Buren House =

Historic house in New York, United States

- U.S. National Register of Historic Places
- Location within New York Location within the United States
- Nearest city: Fulton, New York
- Coordinates: 43°22′1″N 76°25′34″W
- Area: 1.8 acres (0.73 ha)
- Built: 1832
- Architectural style: Federal
- NRHP reference No.: 88001707
- Added to NRHP: October 07, 1988

Volkert Van Buren House is a historic home located near Fulton in Oswego County, New York. It is a Federal style structure constructed about 1832.

It was listed on the National Register of Historic Places in 1988.
