= German Ceramic Society =

German Ceramic Society (DKG)
- Formation: 1919 (1913)
- Legal status: Registered association
- Purpose: Promotion and advancement of ceramics in industry, science and teaching
- Headquarters: Cologne, Germany
- Members: Approx. 600 personal and 250 institutional members
- Managing Director: Dr. Detlev Nicklas
- Website: https://www.dkg.de

The German Ceramic Society is an association founded in 1919 and headquartered in the city of Cologne, Germany. With its more than 600 personal and 250 institutional members, it is the largest ceramics society in Europe. Worldwide, it is one of the oldest associations in this field.

The society is not only a technical-scientific association, it is also a trade association which works for the advancement of ceramics and related fields.

The German Ceramic Society is a founding member of the European Ceramic Society.

== Tasks and activities ==
Based on its charter, the role of the association is “the promotion of the entire ceramic sector regarding technical, scientific and artistic matters“. Today, the activities of the society are subdivided in four main sections:

- Research and Development
- Training and Further Education
- Dialogue and Debate
- Art, Design and Culture.

The organization has 15 expert committees and community committees that undertake research projects, often in cooperation with other associations and organizations. The prime objective of the projects is the solution of a basic industrial practice, but the groups also undertake theoretical problems concerning all areas of ceramics and related specialist fields.

Research funding and the coordination of the research projects is provided by the autonomous research community of the German Ceramic Society. Within the association, there are two expert committees that operate independently: The Carbon Task Force, which is also part of the European Carbon Association, and the Ceramic Injection Moulding Expert Group, which was founded in 2008.

The society and the affiliated committees organize specialist conferences, training seminars and trade fairs. A key event is the traditional annual meeting during which speakers from all areas of the ceramic industry give lectures on current issues. It is also the co-publisher of two association journals - the application-oriented journal „cfi News / Berichte der DKG“ and the scientific „Journal of Ceramic Science and Technology“

== Structure of the association ==
The governing bodies of the association are the general members meeting, the executive board, the head of scientific works and the management. During the annual meetings, the members elect the executive board which may consist of up to 20 persons. The association’s executive board is responsible for the programmatic and thematic conception of the society's activities. It is also responsible for the budget and the management of the assets. The head of scientific works is a member of the executive board and also a member of the presidium. Her or his task is to put into practice the purpose of the association in the scientific field. The management board is responsible for day-to-day business. In case of decisions that require approval, the presidium must be consulted. It consists of five members of the executive board.

== History ==
The decision to establish the German Ceramic Society was taken on September 29, 1919. In the course of a reorganization, it was developed from the independent technical-scientific department of a federation of ceramic trades that existed since 1913, the „Verband Keramischer Gewerke“. The main reason for the spin-off was to maintain the competitiveness of the German industrial companies by combining their different research activities. The spin-off was significantly brought forward by Philipp Rosenthal, who was at the time president of the federation.

The first professorship for ceramics in Germany was set up at the Technische Hochschule in Charlottenburg (now Technische Universität Berlin) in 1921. The chemical-technical experimental station of the Royal Porcelain Manufacture in Berlin was recognized as a university institute and received the authorization to accept diploma theses and dissertations. After the Second World War, the society was disbanded, as were all other German associations. The re-creation of the organization took place on 19 March 1949, in the city of Bonn. In the following year, it was admitted as an active member of the European Union of Ceramics Associations. With the support of the society in a short period of time, university institutes for ceramics were opened or reopened in the cities of Aachen, Berlin, Clausthal, and Erlangen. The Institute for Silicate Research in Wuerzburg was also reopened.

The main focus of the work shifted to research and training, and to the support of ceramic craftwork and the international linkage of the German ceramics industry. In the 1960s, interdisciplinary research became the focus of the association’s attention. In the context of German reunification, the exchange with the newly formed German states was successfully taken up.

== Members ==
Membership includes 600 individuals, 175 companies, and about 60 universities and technical colleges, institutes and other facilities. Cooperative agreements exist with 18 national and international industrial associations and research groupings.
