= New York State Route 631 =

State highway in Onondaga County, New York, US

New York State Route 631

- Map of northwestern Onondaga County with NY 631 highlighted in red

Route information
- Maintained by NYSDOT, Onondaga County and the town of Lysander
- Length: 5.05 mi (8.13 km)
- Existed: June 1999–present

Major junctions
- South end: NY 370 in Baldwinsville
- North end: NY 48 / NY 690 in Lysander

Location
- Country: United States
- State: New York
- Counties: Onondaga

Highway system
- New York Highways; Interstate; US; State; Reference; Parkways
← NY 598	→ NY 635

New York State Route 631 (NY 631) is a north–south state highway in Onondaga County, New York, in the United States. It serves as a bypass around the village of Baldwinsville, extending for just over 5 miles (8.0 km) from an intersection with NY 370 in the southeastern part of the village to a junction with NY 48 and NY 690 just north of Baldwinsville in the town of Lysander. The route has a short overlap with NY 31 east of the village. Most of the route is two lanes wide and passes through rural areas around the edge of Baldwinsville, while a part near the Lysander community of Radisson is four lanes wide and serves residential and commercial neighborhoods.

A bypass of Baldwinsville had been proposed as early as the 1970s. The earliest concepts for the road called for a long highway connecting NY 690 south of the village to NY 481 in Clay, east of Lysander. After two decades of planning and community input, the New York State Department of Transportation (NYSDOT) presented four potential alignments for a scaled-back route running from NY 48 to NY 31 in 1994. Although an alignment encircling the village limits was chosen within four years, work on the project was stalled due to a lack of funding. In the meantime, NY 631 was assigned in 1999 to a series of pre-existing local roads that formed a northern bypass of Baldwinsville between NY 48 and NY 31. The section of the originally planned southern bypass northeast of NY 370 was finally completed in 2001 as an extension of NY 631.

== Route description ==
NY 631 begins at an intersection with NY 370 near the eastern edge of Baldwinsville. The route heads northeastward through a residential section of the town of Lysander, paralleling the Baldwinsville village line to an intersection with NY 31 across from an Anheuser-Busch brewery. At this point, NY 631 turns eastward, overlapping with NY 31 for a half-mile (0.8 km) to the southwestern edge of Lysander's Radisson community. The routes split here, with NY 631 heading northward into a commercial district as a four-lane divided highway named Willett Parkway. The commercial properties give way to homes at a junction with the two-lane West Entry Road, where NY 631 turns west to bypass northeast Baldwinsville. While on West Entry Road, the highway crosses mostly undeveloped areas, save for a handful of industrial complexes along the highway.

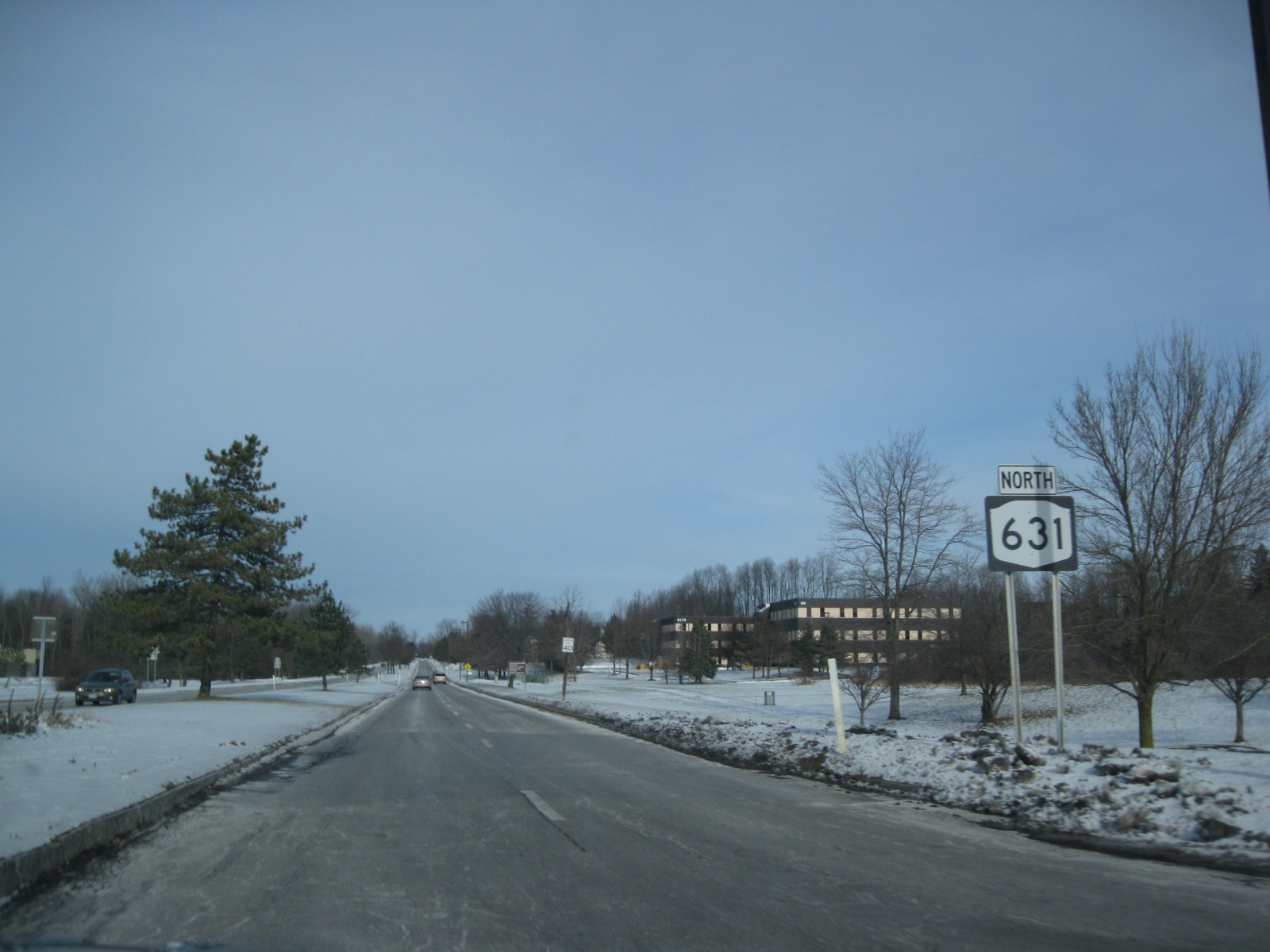
NY 631 northbound on Willett Parkway, just north of NY 31

About 0.8 miles (1.3 km) from Willett Parkway, NY 631 intersects Sixty Road (unsigned County Route 140 or CR 140) and becomes known as Hencle Boulevard. The route continues on through little more than woods, crossing CSX Transportation's Baldwinsville Subdivision rail line ahead of an intersection with Smokey Hollow Road (CR 229) adjacent to Lysander Park. West of here, the highway continues through undeveloped forests as it curves to the northwest around the far northern extents of Baldwinsville. The woods eventually give way to more open areas ahead of a junction with NY 48 in a rural area northwest of the village. NY 48 and NY 631 briefly overlap to reach an adjacent intersection that serves as the northern terminus of both NY 690 and NY 631.

Maintenance of NY 631 varies along the route. From NY 370 to NY 31, as well as on the portions that overlap other state routes, maintenance of NY 631 is performed by NYSDOT. Between CR 140 and NY 48, the roadway is maintained by Onondaga County as CR 95. From NY 31 to CR 140, maintenance is performed by the town of Lysander.

The 2017 route log erroneously shows NY 631's southern terminus at NY 31.

== History ==
=== Origins ===
Plans to construct a bypass of the village of Baldwinsville have existed in some form since at least the mid-1970s. Around that time, NYSDOT developed a proposal for a highway intended to divert traffic away from the Baldwinsville village center and provide access to Radisson, a planned community developed east of Baldwinsville by the New York State Urban Development Corporation. Several alignments of varying endpoints and length were considered by NYSDOT; however, all of the potential routes began south of Baldwinsville at NY 690 and proceeded generally northeastward along the NY 31 corridor to NY 481 in the adjacent town of Clay. The 1988 New York Transportation Bond Act, dubbed "Rebuild New York", provided funding for the design and planning stages of the project, and NYSDOT began gathering feedback on the project from the community in June 1991.

In January 1994, NYSDOT released a new, refined set of plans for the project based on community input that considered four specific alignments for the road. Unlike the original highway proposed 20 years before, the proposed paths, referred to by the state as the Red, Yellow, Purple, and Railroad alternatives, would only run from a point just south of the village center to a location along NY 31 in either eastern Baldwinsville or just east of the village in the town of Lysander. The Red Alternative would begin at NY 48 near the southern village line and head to the northeast, while the Yellow route would start at the junction of NY 48 and Downer Street just across the Seneca River from the village center and proceed to the east. After crossing the Seneca River, the two routes merged to follow a single path north-northeastward across NY 370 to NY 31 in Lysander. The Red and Yellow alternatives were the two most expensive options, with an estimated cost of $15 million and $18 million, respectively.

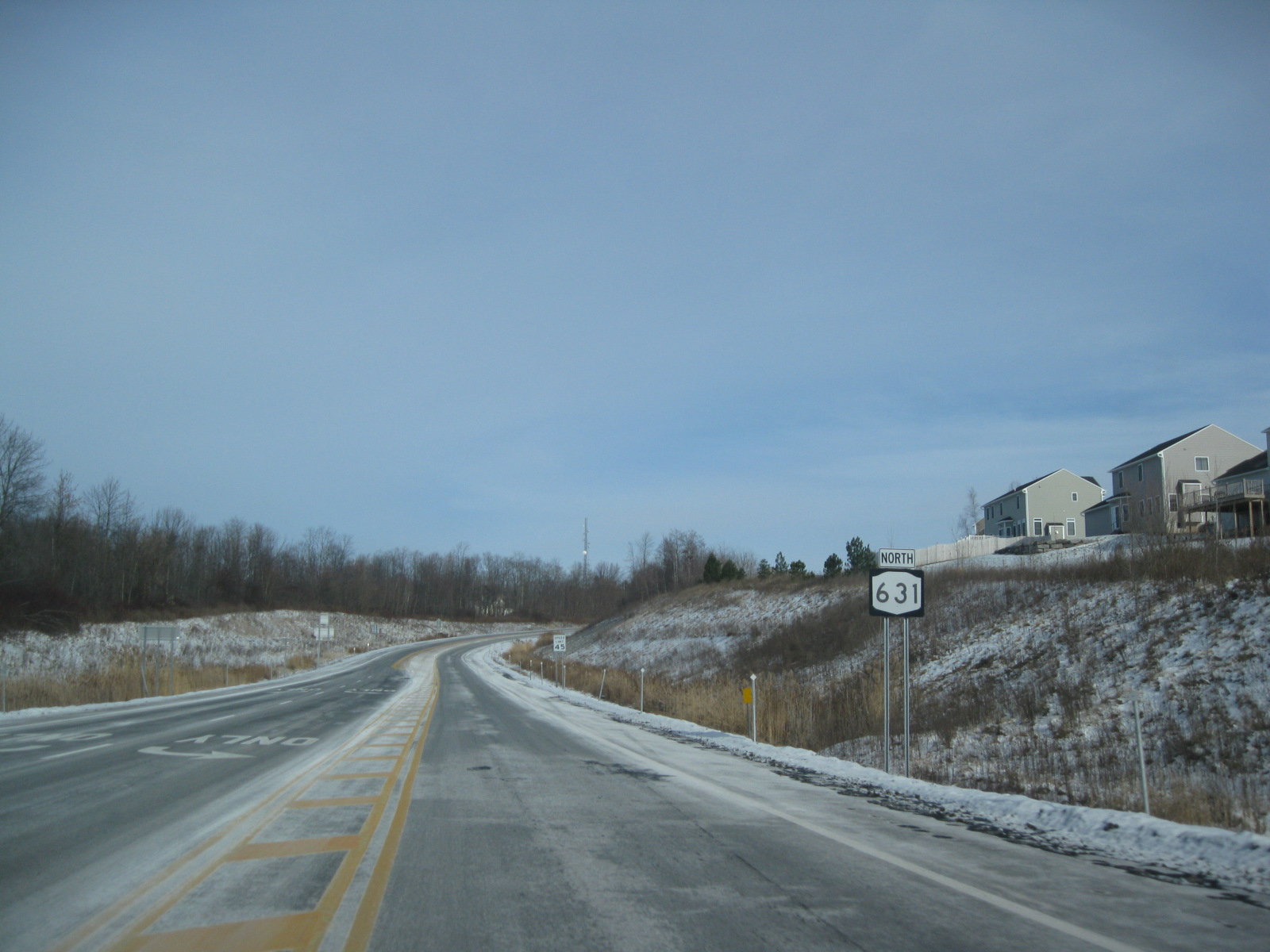
Heading away from NY 370 on NY 631 northbound

The other two proposed paths stayed much closer to the village center. Like the Yellow Alternative, the Purple route would begin at the intersection of NY 48 and Downer Street; however, the Purple Alternative went to the northeast instead, meeting NY 370 two blocks southeast of its intersection with NY 31. At this point, the road would turn north for a short distance to connect to NY 31. The Railroad Alternative began at the junction of NY 48 and Van Buren Road south of the village and generally paralleled NY 48 northwestward into the village center, where it would end at NY 31 one block to the east of NY 48's junction with NY 31. The projected price tag on the Railroad Alternative was $14 million, while the Purple Alternative was the least expensive of the four alignments at $11 million. By March 1998, the state had selected the Red Alternative, now projected to cost $20 million. Although the plans to build the road were in place, construction of the highway was delayed for years due to a lack of funding.

=== Designation and construction ===
With the bypass project stalled, the state of New York assigned NY 631 in June 1999 to a series of pre-existing, locally maintained roadways between NY 31 and the intersection between NY 48 and NY 690. The new route provided a signed bypass of Baldwinsville, albeit to the north instead of the south. In July 2000, construction finally began on the section of the southern bypass between NY 370 and NY 31. The $3.1 million highway opened to traffic on October 16, 2001, as part of an extended NY 631.

There are currently no plans to build the remainder of the bypass; however, the topic was discussed in August 2012 by officials from the town of Lysander. In 2013, NYSDOT rehabilitated NY 370's bridge over the Seneca River southeast of the village, partially or completely closing the bridge to traffic for half of the year. The completion of the bypass was one of several ideas proposed by town officials to reduce the impact of the bridge closure on motorists. While the originally chosen Red Alternative called for the highway to intersect NY 48 near the southern village line, the town suggested building the missing segment of the road along the path of the Yellow Alternative to connect to Downer Street instead.

== Major intersections ==
The entire route is in Onondaga County.

Location	mi	km	Destinations	Notes
Baldwinsville	0.00	0.00	NY 370 – Liverpool, Baldwinsville	Southern terminus
Lysander	0.78	1.26	NY 31 west – Baldwinsville	Western terminus of NY 31 / NY 631 overlap
Lysander	1.27	2.04	NY 31 east – Cicero	Eastern terminus of NY 31 / NY 631 overlap; community of Radisson
Lysander	5.00	8.05	NY 48 south	Eastern terminus of NY 48 / NY 631 overlap
Lysander	5.05	8.13	NY 48 north / NY 690 south	Northern terminus, western terminus of NY 48 / NY 631 overlap; northern terminus of NY 690
1.000 mi = 1.609 km; 1.000 km = 0.621 mi: Concurrency terminus

== See also ==
- List of county routes in Onondaga County, New York
