= New York State Route 48 =

State highway in Central New York, US

New York State Route 48
- Map of central New York with NY 48 highlighted in red and NY 931B in blue

Route information
- Maintained by NYSDOT and the cities of Fulton and Oswego
- Length: 28.20 mi (45.38 km)
- Existed: 1930–present

Major junctions
- South end: I-690 in Van Buren
- NY 31 / NY 370 in Baldwinsville; NY 3 in Fulton
- North end: NY 104 in Oswego

Location
- Country: United States
- State: New York
- Counties: Onondaga, Oswego

Highway system
- New York Highways; Interstate; US; State; Reference; Parkways
← NY 47	→ NY 49

New York State Route 48 (NY 48) is a 28.20-mile (45.38 km) north–south state highway in Central New York in the United States. The southern terminus of the route is located at Interstate 690 (I-690) exit 3 near the interchange between I-690 and the New York State Thruway (I-90) in Van Buren, northwest of Syracuse. The northern terminus is located at an intersection with NY 104 in Oswego. In between, NY 48 passes through the riverside communities of Baldwinsville and Fulton and runs alongside both the Seneca River and Oswego River. For most of its route, NY 48 serves as an alternate route of NY 481. The routes share similar alignments along the Oswego River from the Syracuse area to Oswego, with NY 481 following the eastern riverbank between the two locations.

When the route was originally assigned as part of the 1930 renumbering of state highways in New York, it extended southward into downtown Syracuse. NY 48 was truncated to Van Buren after I-690 was built over portions of the road in the late 1950s and early 1960s. The portion of former NY 48 that was not supplanted by I-690 was turned over to Onondaga County; however, the state reacquired the segment adjacent to the New York State Fairgrounds in 1980. Around 1931, a suffixed spur of NY 48, New York State Route 48A was designated as an alternate from Oswego to the town of Minetto. The route was deleted from the state highway system around 1940.

== Route description ==
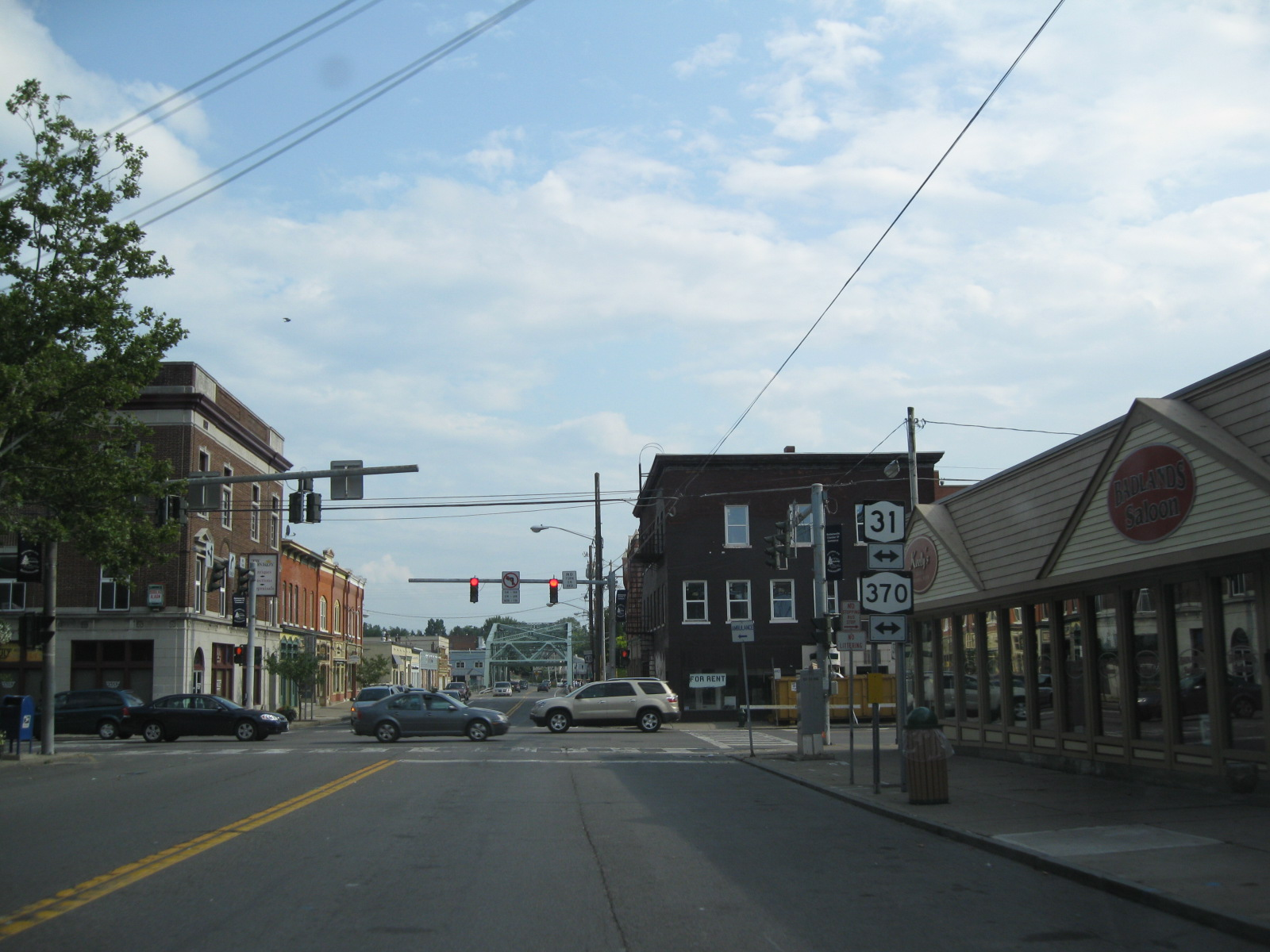
NY 48 southbound at NY 31 and NY 370 in Baldwinsville

NY 48 begins at I-690 exit 3 just west of the Geddes town line in Van Buren, Onondaga County. Known as State Fair Boulevard, it proceeds west-northwest, paralleling both NY 690 (the northward continuation of I-690) and the Seneca River as it passes south of the Seneca Golf Club and Community Park. Shortly after passing the park, NY 48 enters the village of Baldwinsville on Syracuse Street and intersects Downer Street, the former routing of NY 31 west of the village. Originally, NY 31 overlapped NY 48 across the Seneca River (here part of the Erie Canal) to Genesee Street; now, however, NY 48 continues alone to Genesee, where it intersects the modern routing of NY 31 (concurrent with NY 370) through Baldwinsville. North of NY 31 and NY 370, NY 48 becomes Oswego Street and turns northwest before traveling south of Lysander Park as it exits the village and becomes Oswego Road.

In the town of Lysander, NY 48 overlaps NY 631 for a short distance westward to an intersection with the northern end of NY 690. Here, NY 48 turns north, and begins to run as an alternate to NY 481. Both routes run from the Syracuse area to downtown Oswego. NY 48 runs right along the western side of the Oswego River, while NY 481 runs along the eastern side of the river. Both routes run through downtown Fulton and Oswego which are the two cities along the Oswego River. At several points, all that separates the two routes is the river itself.

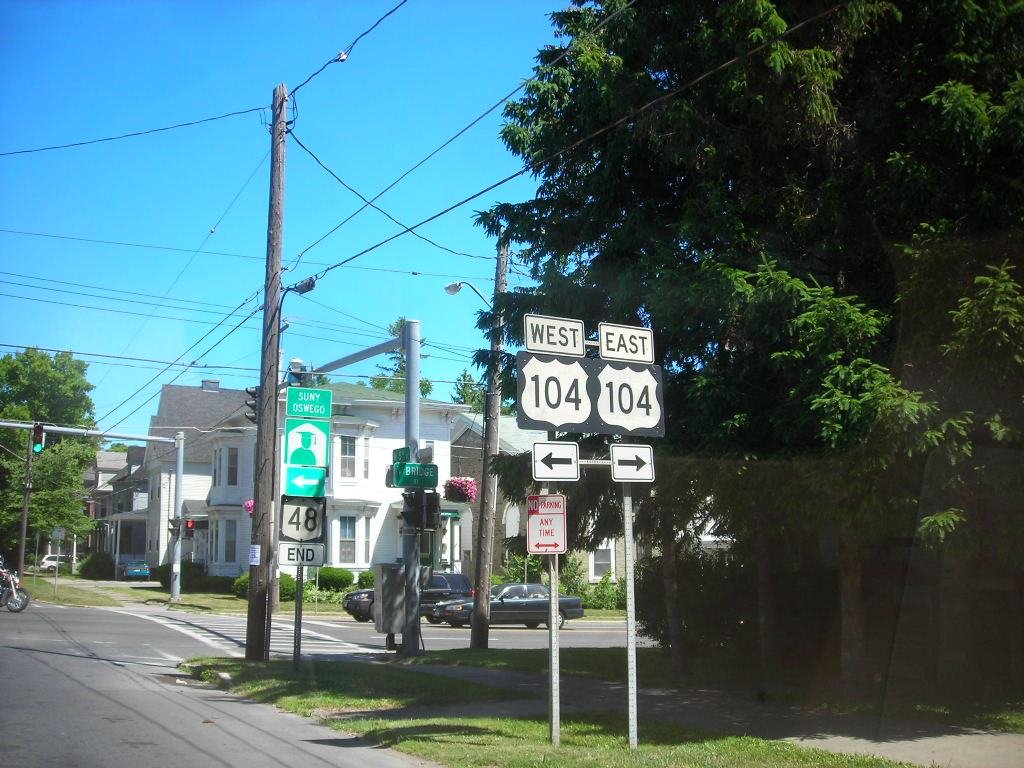
Northern terminus of NY 48 at NY 104 in Oswego

Further north in Lysander, NY 48 crosses the CSX Transportation-owned Baldwinsville Subdivision before turning to the northeast as it passes through the hamlet of Wrights Corners and entering Oswego County. Just past the county line in Granby, the route turns northwest, following the western bank the Oswego River (and paralleling County Route 57 or CR 57 on the opposite side) as it intersects CR 46 near the hamlet of Hinmansville. NY 48 continues along the riverbank to the city of Fulton, where it gains the name West First Street south of an intersection with NY 176. Like NY 31 in Baldwinsville, NY 48 originally overlapped NY 176 north to NY 3 (Broadway), where NY 176 continued east. Now, however, NY 176 ends here and NY 48 continues solo to NY 3. Past Broadway, NY 48 proceeds north through the remainder of Fulton, now paralleling NY 481 extremely close with just Oswego River separating the two.

Midway between Fulton and the Minetto hamlet of the same name, NY 48 serves Battle Island State Park, named for a small island in the Oswego River a short distance to the north. NY 48 presses onward along the edge of the Oswego to the hamlet of Minetto, where it intersects CR 24, formerly NY 48A. North of the hamlet, NY 48 passes by the Oswego Country Club as it enters the Oswego city limits. Once in the City of Oswego, NY 48 becomes West First Street. At Utica Street, NY 48 briefly turns west before turning back north at West Fifth Street and terminating at NY 104 (Bridge Street). West First Street continues north for an additional six blocks to the Lake Ontario shoreline. NY 48 is city-maintained within the cities of Fulton and Oswego; the rest of the highway is maintained by the New York State Department of Transportation (NYSDOT).

== History ==
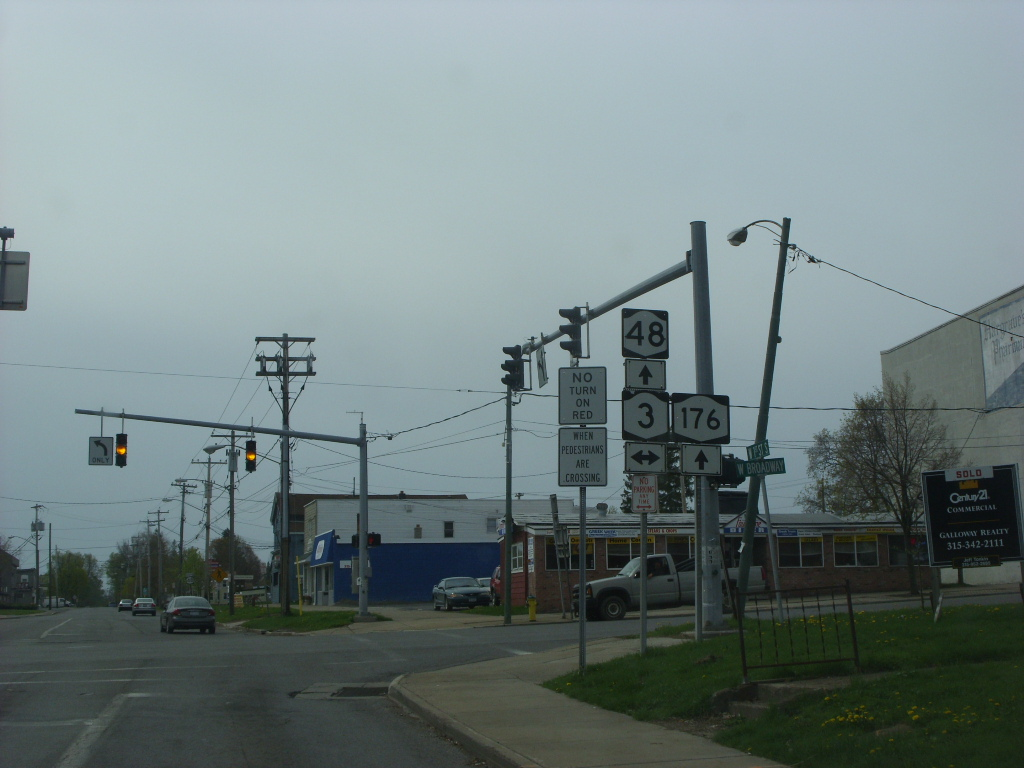
NY 48 southbound at NY 3 in Fulton

In the 1930 renumbering of state highways in New York, NY 48 was assigned to a previously unnumbered roadway between downtown Syracuse and Oswego. From Van Buren north to Oswego, NY 48 roughly followed its modern alignment; south of Van Buren, NY 48 was routed on State Fair Boulevard and Geddes Street to terminate at NY 5, then routed on Erie Boulevard. The route was realigned slightly within Syracuse between 1938 and 1940 to use portions of Hiawatha Boulevard and West Genesee Street (as well as a new portion of State Fair Boulevard) to meet NY 5 at the modern intersection of Erie Boulevard and Genesee Street.

The portion of the New York State Thruway from Rochester east to the Westmoreland hamlet of Lowell opened on June 24, 1954. At the time, exit 39 connected directly to NY 48. As early as 1954, plans were drawn up to construct a freeway along the NY 48 corridor between the Thruway and NY 48 at the New York State Fairgrounds just northwest of the Syracuse city limits. Construction on the highway, situated between NY 48 and Onondaga Lake, began in the mid-1950s and was completed by 1961. Other areas of State Fair Boulevard (NY 48) were upgraded into limited-access highways, including at Thruway exit 39 and in downtown Syracuse. As a result, NY 48 was truncated to its present southern terminus at the freeway, designated as I-690, in Van Buren.

Following the removal of NY 48 south of the Thruway, the portion of State Fair Boulevard from the Syracuse city line north to I-690 exit 5 in Geddes became CR 80. On April 1, 1980, ownership and maintenance of CR 80 between I-690 exits 6 (NY 695) and 7 (NY 297) was transferred to the state of New York as part of a highway maintenance swap between the state and Onondaga County. This segment, 0.90 miles (1.45 km) in length, is now designated as NY 931B, an unsigned reference route. The remainder of State Fair Boulevard within Geddes is still designated as CR 80 even though the designation now exists in two parts.

== NY 48A ==
New York State Route 48A
- Location: Oswego–Minetto
- Existed: c. 1931–c. 1940

NY 48A was a designation assigned to an alternate route of NY 48 between the city of Oswego and the Minetto hamlet of the same name. It was assigned c. 1931 and began at the modern junction of NY 48 and CR 24 in Minetto. From there, it proceed west on what is now CR 24 and north on West Fifth Street (partly CR 25) to Oswego, where NY 48A reconnected to its parent by way of Niagara Street. The designation was removed c. 1940.

== Major intersections ==
County	Location	mi	km	Destinations	Notes
Onondaga	Van Buren	0.00	0.00	I-690 to I-90; John Glenn Boulevard; Farrell Road	Southern terminus, exit 7B (I-690); community of Seneca Knolls. Direct access from John Glenn Boulevard westbound traffic only; eastbound access from NY 48 to John Glenn Boulevard via Farrell Road
Onondaga	Baldwinsville	4.50	7.24	NY 31 / NY 370 (Genesee Street)	
Onondaga	Lysander			NY 631 south	Eastern terminus of NY 48 / NY 631 overlap
Onondaga	Lysander	6.92	11.14	NY 631 (Hencle Boulevard) / NY 690	Western terminus of NY 48 / NY 631 overlap; northern terminus of NY 631; northern terminus of NY 690
Oswego	Fulton	16.23	26.12	NY 176 south (Curtis Street)	Northern terminus of NY 176
Oswego	Fulton	16.94	27.26	NY 3 (West Broadway)	
Oswego	Oswego	28.20	45.38	NY 104 (West Bridge Street)	Northern terminus
1.000 mi = 1.609 km; 1.000 km = 0.621 mi: Concurrency terminus

== See also ==
- List of county routes in Onondaga County, New York
