= Battle Island State Park =

State park in Oswego County, New York

- Location within New York
- Interactive map of Battle Island State Park
- Type: State park
- Location: 2150 State Route 48; Fulton, New York
- Coordinates: 43°22′N 76°26′W
- Area: 235 acres (0.95 km^{2})
- Created: 1938
- Operator: New York State Office of Parks, Recreation and Historic Preservation
- Visitors: 33,056 (in 2020)
- Open: All year
- Website: Battle Island State Park

Battle Island State Park is a 235-acre (0.95 km^{2}) state park located on the Oswego River in Oswego County, New York. Included within the park is the 18-hole Battle Island State Park Golf Course. The park is located on the west bank of the river, north of the City of Fulton, along New York State Route 48.

== History ==
Battle Island State Park's name refers to a battle that took place on a nearby island on July 3, 1756, during the French and Indian War. The battle commenced after a British fleet, returning from delivering supplies to Fort Ontario, was ambushed by a party of French and Indians. Although outnumbered, British and Colonial forces were able repulse several attacks by using the island as a stronghold. The island identified on maps as "Battle Island" was created during the excavation of an adjacent canal; the battle actually took place on a smaller island just to the south.

Battle Island State Park occupies land originally owned by Frederick A. Emerick, who deeded 200 acres (0.81 km^{2}) of the park's property to the state in 1916. When the remainder of his property was turned over to the state in 1938, the land was officially designated as a state park.

== Facilities ==
One of the park's main attractions is its 18-hole, par 72 golf course, designed by Devereux Emmett. The course length is 5,973 yards (5,462 m) from its longest tees.

The park also offers trails for cross-country skiing and a food concession.

== See also ==
- List of New York state parks
