= New York State Route 31A =

State highway in western New York, US

New York State Route 31A
- Map of western New York with NY 31A highlighted in red

Route information
- Auxiliary route of NY 31
- Maintained by NYSDOT
- Length: 22.89 mi (36.84 km)
- Existed: c. 1935–present

Major junctions
- West end: NY 31 / NY 63 in Medina
- East end: NY 19 Truck / NY 31 near Brockport

Location
- Country: United States
- State: New York
- Counties: Orleans, Monroe

Highway system
- New York Highways; Interstate; US; State; Reference; Parkways
← NY 31	→ NY 31B
← NY 31C	NY 31D	→ NY 31E

New York State Route 31A (NY 31A) is an east–west state highway located in the western part of New York in the United States. It serves as a southerly alternate route of NY 31 from the western part of Orleans County to the far western part of Monroe County. It diverges from NY 31 south of the village of Medina and parallels NY 31 eastward until it reconnects to its parent route southwest of the village of Brockport. While NY 31 passes through the villages of Medina, Albion, and Holley, NY 31A bypasses all three, serving sparsely populated areas to their south instead. The route intersects NY 98 south of Albion and NY 237 in Clarendon.

The origins of NY 31A date back to the 1930 renumbering of state highways in New York when the section of modern NY 31 between Middleport and Medina was designated as New York State Route 3A. It was renumbered to New York State Route 3B c. 1932 and extended northeastward to Knowlesville via Millville by 1932 before becoming NY 31A c. 1935. The section of modern NY 31 and NY 31A from NY 19 in Brockport to Clarendon was designated as New York State Route 3B in 1930, but was renumbered to New York State Route 3C c. 1932 and the west end was cut back to the Monroe–Orleans county line before becoming New York State Route 31D c. 1935. NY 31A was cut back to its current western terminus in 1949 and extended eastward to NY 19 and NY 31 in Brockport c. 1963, replacing NY 31D. The route was truncated to its current eastern terminus in the early 1980s after NY 31 was altered to bypass Brockport to the southwest.

== Route description ==
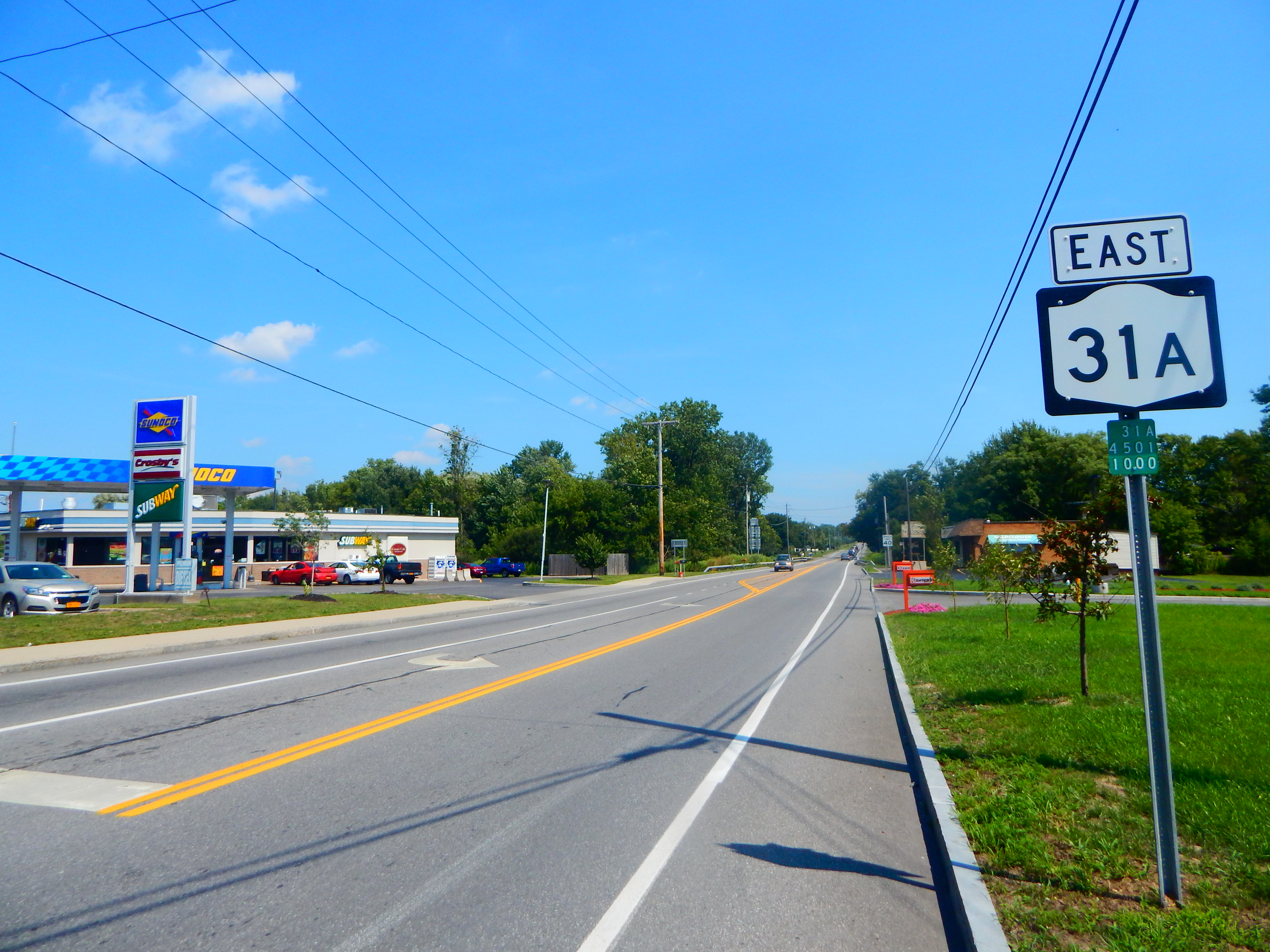
NY 31A heading east from NY 31/NY 63 in Medina

NY 31A begins at a four-way intersection in the southern portion of the village of Medina. At this junction, NY 31 travels to the west and to the north (eastbound), NY 63 travels to the north and to the south, and NY 31A travels to the east as Maple Ridge Road. It leaves the village shortly afterward, entering a rural area of Orleans County dominated by open fields. The route heads due east to Millville, a small hamlet situated at the junction of NY 31A and East Shelby Road in northeastern Shelby. At the eastern edge of the community, NY 31A meets West County House Road, the former routing of NY 31A toward Knowlesville.

Past Millville, NY 31A becomes West Lee Road and heads southeastward through farmland to the Barre town line, at which point the route turns back to the east and follows a slightly northeasterly alignment for 5 miles (8 km) into the town of Albion. Here, NY 31A passes the Benjamin Franklin Gates House, situated on the north side of the route near a junction with Mix Road. Not far to the east, the highway meets NY 98 at a rural junction 3 miles (5 km) south of the village of Albion and 50 yards (46 m) north of the Albion town line. NY 31A, now East Lee Road, continues on a northeasterly line for another 2.5 miles (4.0 km) before curving southward for 1 mile (1.6 km) to avoid a marshy area near the eastern town line. The route briefly reenters Barre along this stretch, heading south and east across the town's northeastern corner on its way into the town of Clarendon.

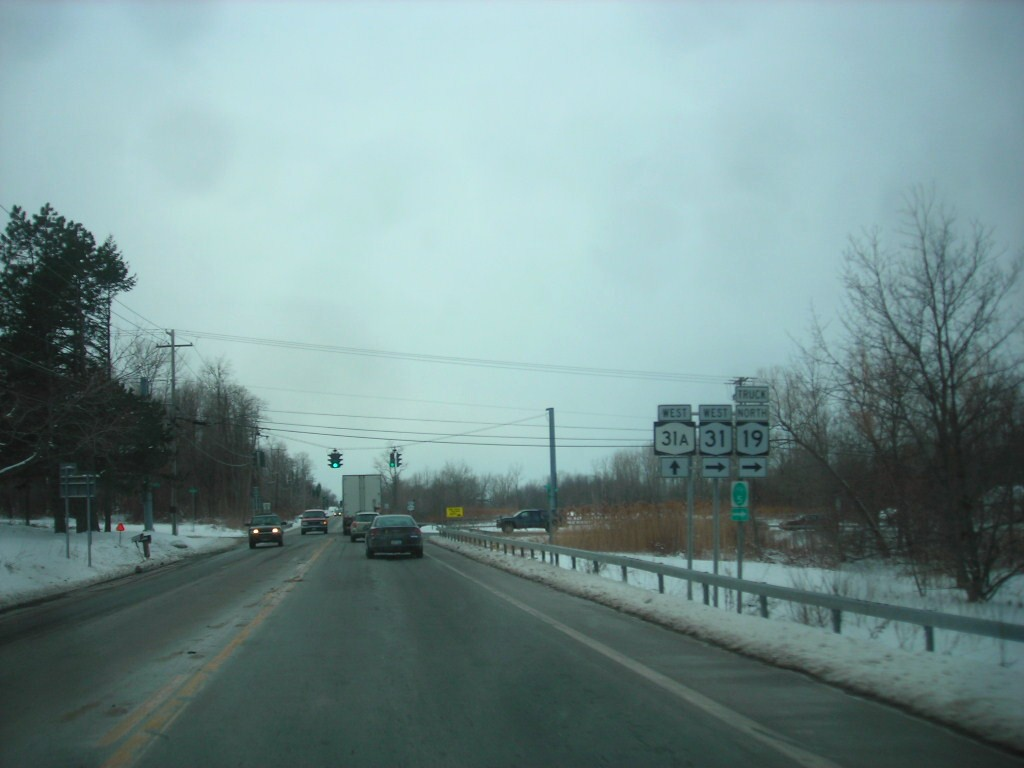
Eastern terminus of NY 31A at NY 31 near Brockport

The highway retains an east–west alignment for 2 miles (3.2 km) to the outskirts of the hamlet of Clarendon, the largest community on the route since Medina. At this point, NY 31A turns southeast to serve Clarendon, where NY 31A intersects NY 237 in the center of the hamlet. Upon crossing NY 237, NY 31A changes names for the final time, becoming Fourth Section Road. The rural surroundings return outside of Clarendon hamlet as a mix of woodlands and fields, which NY 31A progresses generally northeasterly through to the hamlet of Bennetts Corners. Here, the amount of development along the route begins to increase, a change ushered in by a pair of large housing tracts in the eastern part of the community.

East of Bennetts Corners, the route takes on a more easterly alignment as it crosses into Monroe County, which contains just 1.5 miles (2.4 km) of the 23-mile (37 km) NY 31A. In Monroe County, the highway passes through a slightly more populated area on its way to a junction with NY 31 and NY 19 Truck southwest of the village of Brockport. Both NY 19 Truck and NY 31 enter the intersection from the north on Redman Road and turn east at Fourth Section Road, following the right-of-way of NY 31A eastward toward Brockport's business district. The junction completes the alternate loop of NY 31, which follows a parallel but more northerly routing between Medina and Brockport that takes it through the villages of Medina, Albion, and Holley. Along the way, NY 31 passes the campus of SUNY Brockport, situated 0.5 miles (0.8 km) northeast of NY 31A's eastern terminus.

== History ==
New York State Route 31D
- Location: Orleans county line–Brockport
- Existed: c. 1935–c. 1962

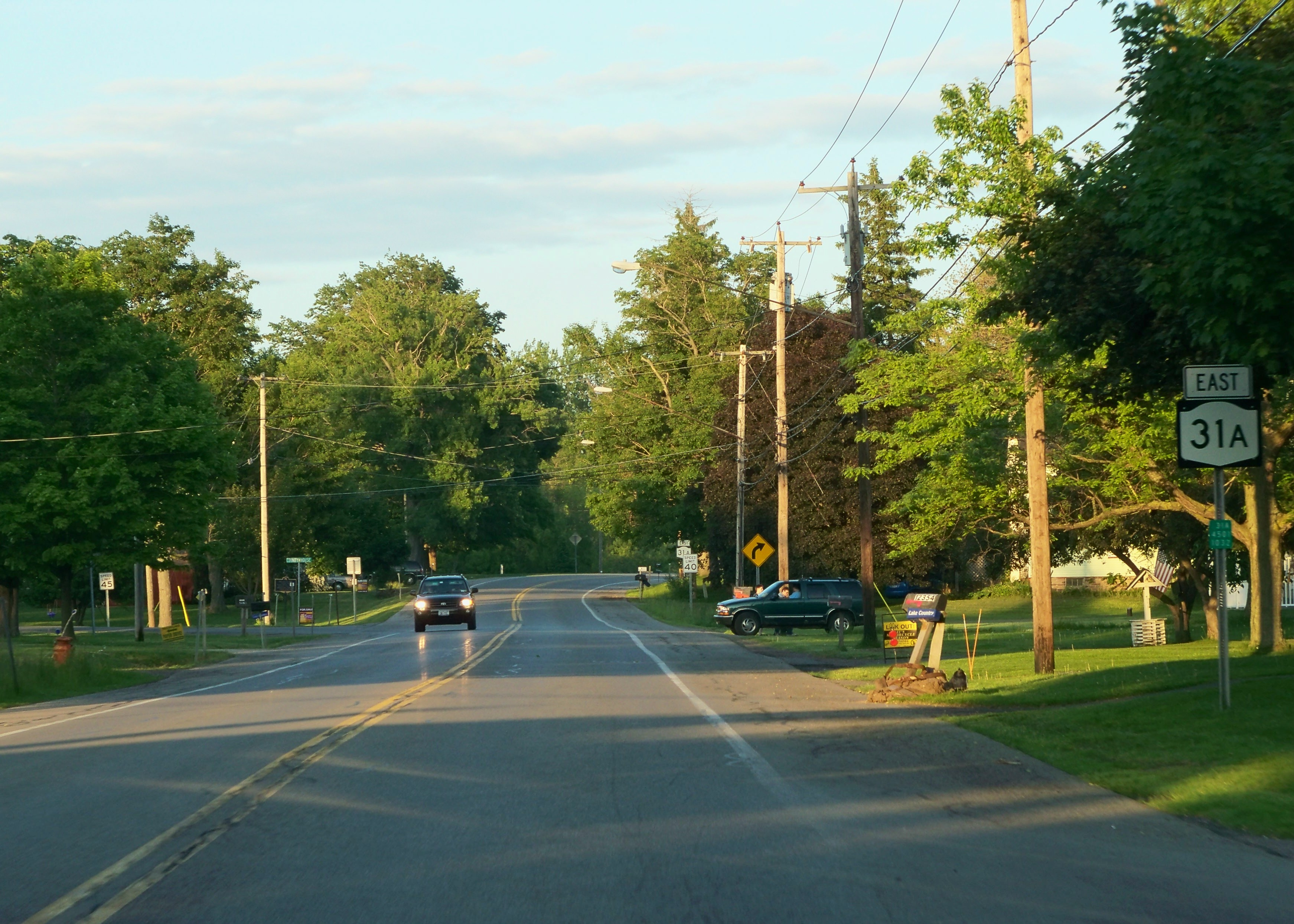
Eastbound on NY 31A in Millville. From the 1930s to the 1960s, NY 31A left Millville on County House Road, shown here at background left.

Most of modern NY 31 west of Rochester—including the section between Gasport and the outskirts of Brockport—was originally designated as part of NY 3 when the first set of posted routes in New York were assigned in 1924. In the 1930 renumbering of state highways in New York, NY 3 was realigned between Middleport and Medina to follow what is now NY 31E. NY 3's former routing between the two villages was designated as NY 3A. NY 3A was redesignated as NY 3B c. 1932 as part of a renumbering of NY 3's suffixed routes. NY 3B was also extended eastward along Maple Ridge, County House, and Taylor Hill Roads to meet NY 31 at Knowlesville Station (a hamlet in the town of Ridgeway) by this time. The route was renumbered again c. 1935, becoming NY 31A after NY 3 was replaced with a realigned NY 31 west of Rochester.

Farther east, the segment of modern NY 31A from Clarendon to Brockport and what is now NY 31 from NY 31A to NY 19 became NY 3B in the 1930 renumbering. Like NY 3A, NY 3B was renumbered to NY 3C c. 1932; however, it was also truncated to consist solely of the Monroe County portion of its routing at this time. The route now began at the Monroe–Orleans county line, where state maintenance of Fourth Section Road began, and ended at the junction of NY 63 (now NY 19) and NY 3 (NY 31) south of Brockport. NY 3C was redesignated as NY 31D c. 1935 following NY 31's supplantation of NY 3 west of Rochester.

On January 1, 1949, NY 31 was rerouted between Middleport and Medina to use NY 31A between the two locations. NY 31A was truncated to its current western terminus in Medina as a result. It was substantially extended c. 1963, however, to a new eastern terminus in Brockport. The highway was rerouted east of Millville to follow a series of previously unnumbered roads through Barre and Clarendon to Monroe County, where it supplanted NY 31D from the county line eastward. NY 31A was truncated slightly to its current eastern terminus in the early 1980s after NY 31 was rerouted to bypass Brockport to the west and south on NY 31A and Redman Road.

== Major intersections ==
County	Location	mi	km	Destinations	Notes
Orleans	Medina	0.00	0.00	NY 31 / NY 63	Western terminus
Orleans	Town of Albion	10.04	16.16	NY 98 – Albion, Batavia	
Orleans	Clarendon	17.85	28.73	NY 237 – Holley, Byron	
Monroe	Sweden	22.89	36.84	NY 19 Truck / NY 31	Eastern terminus
1.000 mi = 1.609 km; 1.000 km = 0.621 mi

== See also ==
- List of county routes in Orleans County, New York
