= New York State Route 31B =

State highway in central New York, United States

New York State Route 31B
- Map of the Weedsport area with NY 31B highlighted in red

Route information
- Auxiliary route of NY 31
- Maintained by NYSDOT
- Length: 4.36 mi (7.02 km)
- Existed: c. 1933–January 2, 1980

Major junctions
- West end: NY 31 in Weedsport
- East end: NY 5 in Elbridge

Location
- Country: United States
- State: New York
- Counties: Cayuga, Onondaga

Highway system
- New York Highways; Interstate; US; State; Reference; Parkways
← NY 31A	→ NY 31C

New York State Route 31B (NY 31B) was a state highway in central New York in the United States. It served as a connector between NY 31, its parent route, in the Cayuga County village of Weedsport and NY 5 in the Onondaga County town of Elbridge. NY 31B was assigned c. 1933, replacing New York State Route 293, a route assigned as part of the 1930 renumbering of state highways in New York. The NY 31B designation was removed in 1980 and replaced by County Route 31B (CR 31B) in Cayuga County and CR 99 in Onondaga County.

== Route description ==
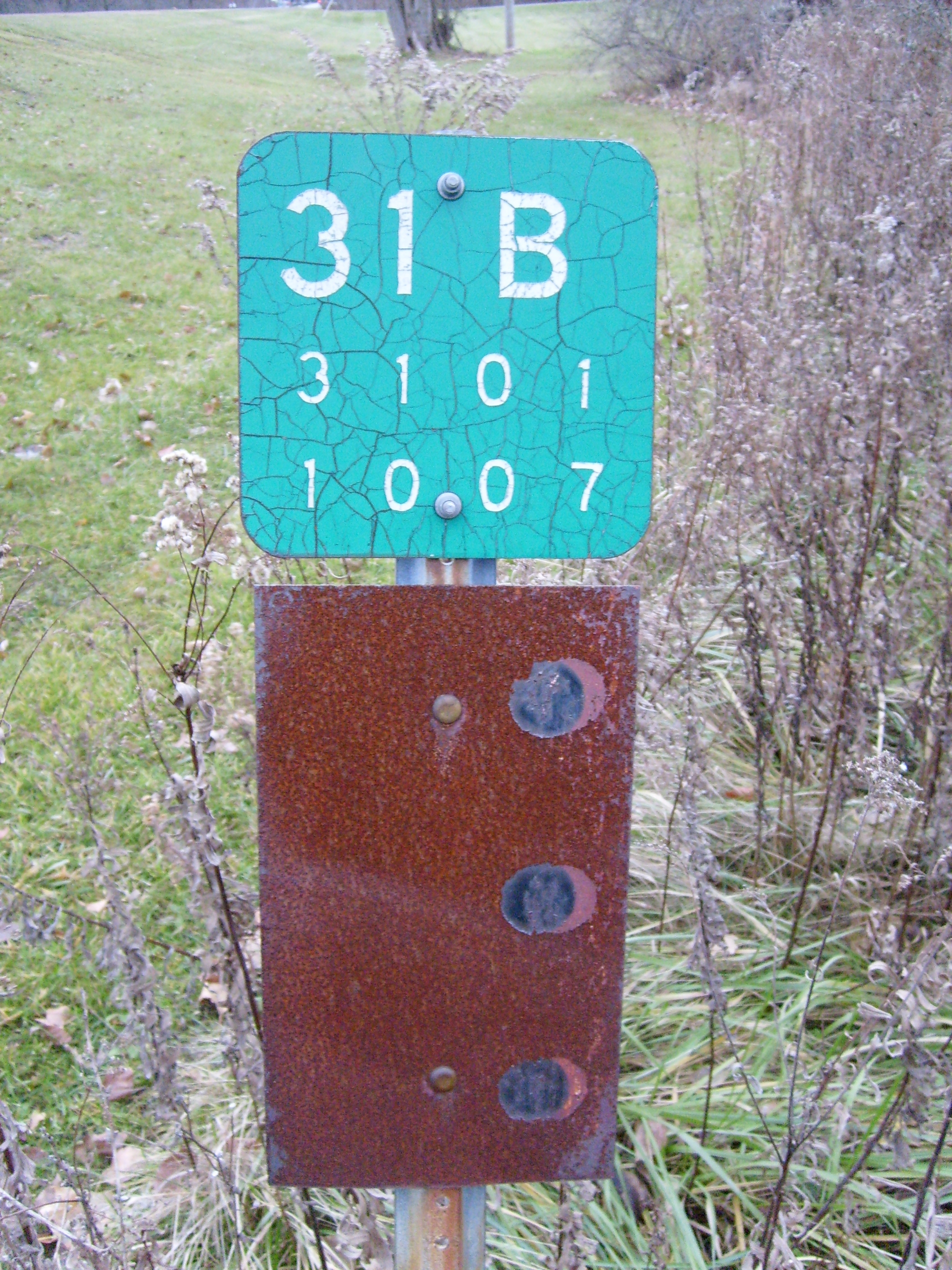
Old reference marker for NY 31B 0.7 miles (1.1 km) from its western terminus

NY 31B began at an intersection with its parent route, NY 31, in the Cayuga County village of Weedsport. The highway went eastward, intersecting with NY 34 less than 0.1 miles (0.2 km) later. Much of Weedsport was urbanized, with the highway passing residential homes and businesses as it progressed eastward through the village. The highway intersected with CR 12B before leaving Weedsport and entering the town of Brutus as Brutus Road.

In Brutus, NY 31B continued to the east through the rural town, intersecting CR 136A and passing the Weedsport Rural Cemetery before turning to the southeast. After a short distance, the highway went through an isolated area of homes, where it intersected with CR 14 and CR 15A. NY 31B continued on, intersecting several local highways before crossing into Onondaga County and terminating at an intersection with NY 5 in the town of Elbridge.

== History ==
What became NY 31B was originally designated as NY 293 as part of the 1930 renumbering of state highways in New York. NY 293 was renumbered to NY 31B c. 1933, allowing the NY 293 designation to be transferred to another highway in Orange County. NY 31B remained unchanged until January 2, 1980, when the NY 31B designation was removed.

Ownership and maintenance of NY 31B's former routing was gradually transferred to the counties it went through, namely Cayuga and Onondaga. The first section to be transferred was the portion within Onondaga County, which was given to the county on April 1, 1980, and designated as CR 99. The Cayuga County section of former NY 31B was transferred to the county one year later on April 1, 1981, and designated as CR 31B for the state route that preceded it.

== Major intersections ==
County	Location	mi	km	Destinations	Notes
Cayuga	Weedsport	0.00	0.00	NY 31	Western terminus
Cayuga	Weedsport	0.05	0.080	NY 34	
Onondaga	Town of Elbridge	4.38	7.05	NY 5	Eastern terminus; Hamlet of Crossman Corners
1.000 mi = 1.609 km; 1.000 km = 0.621 mi

== See also ==
- List of county routes in Cayuga County, New York
- List of county routes in Onondaga County, New York
