= New York State Route 690 =

State highway in central New York, US

New York State Route 690
- Map of the Syracuse area with NY 690 highlighted in red

Route information
- Maintained by NYSDOT
- Length: 6.71 mi (10.80 km)
- Existed: July 1, 1974–present

Major junctions
- South end: I-90 Toll / New York Thruway / I-690 in Van Buren
- North end: NY 48 / NY 631 in Lysander

Location
- Country: United States
- State: New York
- Counties: Onondaga

Highway system
- New York Highways; Interstate; US; State; Reference; Parkways
← I-690	→ I-695

New York State Route 690 (NY 690) is a freeway in Central New York in the United States. NY 690's southern terminus is at an interchange with the New York State Thruway (Interstate 90 or I-90) and I-690 in Van Buren. The northern terminus is at an intersection with NY 48 and NY 631 in Lysander. NY 690 serves the northwest suburbs of Syracuse and Onondaga County. It also provides a link to routes that run into the populated areas of Oswego County, because its northern terminus is just a few miles shy of the county line.

NY 690 is an extension of I-690 in the northwest suburbs of Syracuse. NY 690 is a divided, four-lane highway for its entire run, and is signed north–south even though I-690 is signed east–west. Likewise, NY 481 formerly served as an extension of I-481 until the latter's retirement. NY 690 was designated on July 1, 1974.

== Route description ==
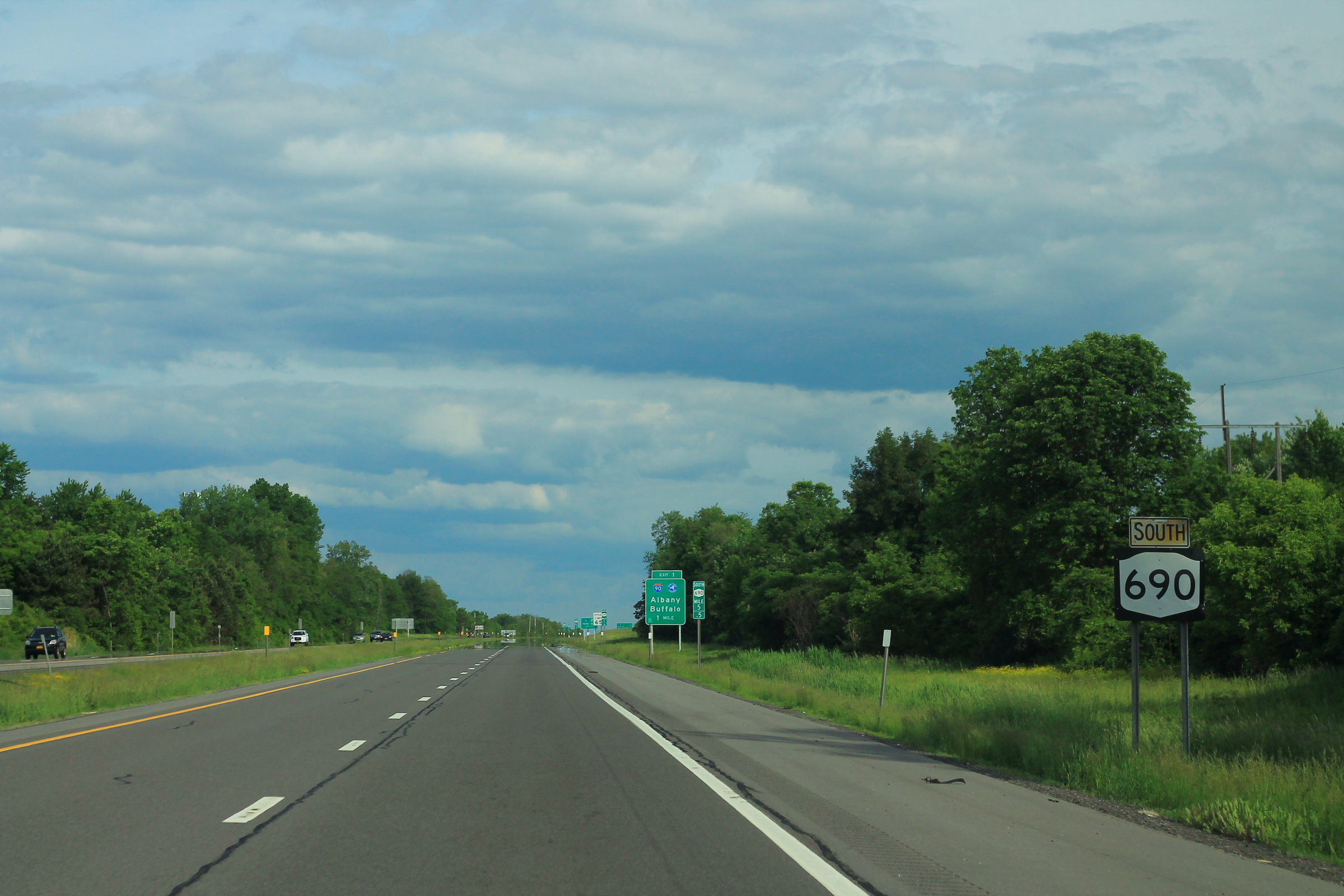
NY 690 southbound approaching exit 1 for I-90/NY State Thruway

NY 690 officially begins at the exit ramp for I-690 exit 1 in Van Buren, where I-690 ends and NY 690 begins. The route, still a freeway, parallels Van Buren Road to its southeast for a short distance, running from northwest to southeast, before meeting the road northwest of the Thruway by way of an interchange. Outside of Baldwinsville, the road begins to turn to the north as it has an exit for Downer Street Road, which carries NY 31 west of the interchange. North of the exit, NY 31 and NY 690 form a concurrency along the western extents of the village as they cross over the Seneca River.

On the north side of the river in Lysander, NY 31 exits onto NY 370 via a partial clover-leaf interchange. The exit with NY 370 is also the northernmost exit on NY 690. The freeway ends shortly after an at-grade intersection with NY 48 and the northern terminus of NY 631 northwest of Baldwinsville. Although NY 690 ends, the right-of-way of the route continues northward as NY 48 toward Fulton.

== History ==
Construction of what is now NY 690 began in the mid-1960s and was completed in the early 1970s. The freeway was designated as NY 690 on July 1, 1974. When the expressway was first constructed, the interchange with the New York State Thruway was located south of the Thruway in the space bounded by Winchell Road, Walters Road, I-690, and the Thruway. The Thruway interchange was rebuilt in 1987, locating it about one mile (1.6 km) north to its current location near Jones Road.

== Exit list ==
New mile-based exit numbers are currently being installed along NY 690 as part of an exit renumbering along I-690. The entire route is in Onondaga County.

Location	mi	km	Old exit	New exit	Destinations	Notes
Van Buren	6.71	10.80	–	–	I-690 east – Syracuse	Continuation east
Van Buren	6.71	10.80	1	6	I-90 Toll / New York Thruway – Albany, Buffalo	Exit 39 on I-90 / Thruway; exit no. corresponds to I-690
Van Buren	4.90	7.89	–	4	Van Buren Road	
Van Buren	2.49	4.01	–	2	NY 31 west – Baldwinsville, Jordan	Southern end of NY 31 concurrency
Lysander	1.57	2.53	–	1	NY 31 east / NY 370 – Meridian, Baldwinsville	Northern end of NY 31 concurrency
Lysander	0.00	0.00	–	–	NY 48 / NY 631 (Church Road / Hencle Boulevard)	Northern terminus; at-grade intersection
1.000 mi = 1.609 km; 1.000 km = 0.621 mi: Concurrency terminus; Electronic toll collection
