= Radisson, New York =

- Census-designated place
- Location within New York Location within the United States
- Coordinates: 43°11′4″N 76°17′49″W
- Country: United States
- State: New York
- County: Onondaga
- Town: Lysander

Area
  - Total: 4.64 sq mi (12.01 km^{2})
  - Land: 4.52 sq mi (11.70 km^{2})
  - Water: 0.12 sq mi (0.31 km^{2})
- Elevation: 435 ft (133 m)

Population (2020)
  - Total: 7,038
  - Density: 1,557.6/sq mi (601.38/km^{2})
- Time zone: UTC-5 (Eastern (EST))
  - Summer (DST): UTC-4 (EDT)
- ZIP Code: 13027 (Baldwinsville)
- Area codes: 315/680
- FIPS code: 36-60455
- GNIS feature ID: 2806957

Radisson is a planned community and census-designated place (CDP) in the town of Lysander, Onondaga County, New York, United States. It was first listed as a CDP prior to the 2020 census. The population was 7,038 at the 2020 census.

The CDP is in northwestern Onondaga County, in the eastern part of the town of Lysander. It is bordered to the southwest by the village of Baldwinsville, to the northwest by the Three Rivers Wildlife Management Area, and to the east by the Seneca River, part of the Erie Canal in this location.

New York State Route 31 (Belgium Road) runs along the southern side of the CDP, leading southwest into Baldwinsville and east 10 miles (16 km) to Cicero. Syracuse is 13 miles (21 km) to the southeast.

== History of Radisson ==
The name “Radisson” is attributed to the earliest known European explorer, Pierre-Esprit Radisson (b. 1636 - d. 1710). While fur trapping and hunting, he was captured by Native American tribes and ultimately escaped. In service to both England and France, he formed exploration parties for scouting resources in Canada as well as the Great Lakes region. Later in life, he co-founded Hudson's Bay Company, where he acquired modest fame that lead to use of his namesake in the famous international hotel chain, multiple towns in North America, movies, books and an outdoor product line.

The current subdivision was once simply called “New Community of Lysander.” The area now named for Radisson has a long and interesting history, beginning just after the American Revolution. At that time, a grateful but impoverished Congress wished to reward its war heroes for their efforts. One of these heroes was young Colonel Marinus Willett. Congress paid its debt to Willett with the grant of a huge parcel of land. Over the years, the Willett family sold parcels of the rich farm land. John Jacob Astor purchased thousands of acres of Willett's land and then sold small parcels to homesteading farmers to visit the area.

At the outset of World War II, the federal government, seeking a site to manufacture armor-piercing munitions, purchased 6,000 acres of the tract from Astor. Farming ceased and much of the land was fenced in as construction began on a large and intricate munitions works. The munitions works employed hundreds of Syracuse-area residents, but operated only briefly and closed down soon after the war. Machinery was removed, buildings demolished and slowly, the acreage returned to woodlands. Deer and other animals returned as the site became an oasis of trees, lakes, and woodland streams. The government provided 3,000 acres of this land to the State of New York for a game management area. The remaining 3,000 acres was retained for future use. A number of potential uses were suggested for this large, attractive 3,000 acre tract over the years.

In 1968, officials of the New York State Urban Development Corporation (UDC) visited the area to discuss potential projects the corporation could undertake that would benefit Central New Yorkers. The UDC was directed to the old munitions site. UDC officials agreed to study the possibility that this site could be used to absorb and control the rapid growth of Central New York's northern area. After nearly a year of preliminary study, UDC presented its plan for a brand new community - Radisson.

In 1974, the first home was constructed. Since then, the community has grown rapidly, with steady improvements in amenities and overall quality of life for its residents. The adjacent corporate park is home to over forty businesses and covers fifty-six acres. Notable corporate tenants include town offices, childcare, distribution centers, food production & warehousing, banking, law enforcement, several engineering/manufacturing companies, large athletic complexes and the largest brewery in the Northeast.

== Radisson Today ==
Radisson is known for its residential neighborhoods, a golf course, design standards for homes, a corporate park, and a network of community trails along local streams and ponds. According to the 2020 census, Radisson has approximately 3,000 homes. It also hosts a corporate park as well as a wide range of recreational, educational and community services. It's located a short distance from major highways and the Village of Baldwinsville.

== Education ==
It is within the Baldwinsville Central School District.

== Demographics ==
As of the 2020 USA Census, Radisson had a population of 7,038 people. Positive population growth is expected in the 2020 decade, likely attributable to expansion of community lands (by acquisition and merging of adjacent acreage), thus lending itself to construction of new homes. Population inflow to Radisson may reasonably be driven by relocations from surrounding communities as well as out-of-state relocations associated with overall regional economic growth (e.g., semiconductor chip business) in the Syracuse, NY census designated area.

Historical population
Census	Pop.	Note	%±
2020	7,038		—
U.S. Decennial Census
