= Lysander, New York =

- Town
- Location in Onondaga County and the state of New York.
- Coordinates: 43°10′22″N 76°21′17″W
- Country: United States
- State: New York
- County: Onondaga

Government
  - Type: Town Council
  - Town Supervisor: Kevin Rode (D)
  - Town Council: Members' List: • John F. Krisanda (R); • Arthur C. Levy (R); • Brian F. May (R); • Edward Reed (R)

Area
  - Total: 64.61 sq mi (167.34 km^{2})
  - Land: 61.71 sq mi (159.84 km^{2})
  - Water: 2.90 sq mi (7.50 km^{2})
- Elevation: 436 ft (133 m)

Population (2020)
  - Total: 23,074
  - Density: 373.88/sq mi (144.36/km^{2})
- Time zone: UTC-5 (Eastern (EST))
  - Summer (DST): UTC-4 (EDT)
- ZIP code: 13027
- Area code: 315
- FIPS code: 36-44039
- GNIS feature ID: 0979177
- Website: www.townoflysander.org

Lysander is a town in Onondaga County, New York, United States. As of the 2020 Census, the population was 23,074. The town was named after Lysander, a Spartan military leader, by a clerk interested in the classics. Lying to the northwest of Syracuse, much of the town is suburban in character.

== History ==
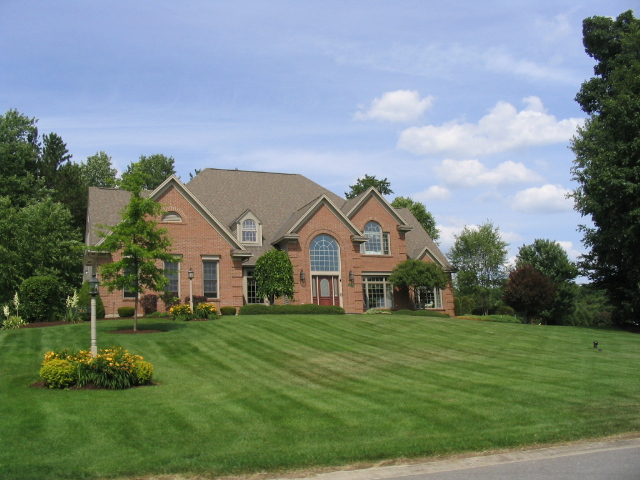
Upscale homes like this one in Lysander are becoming common.

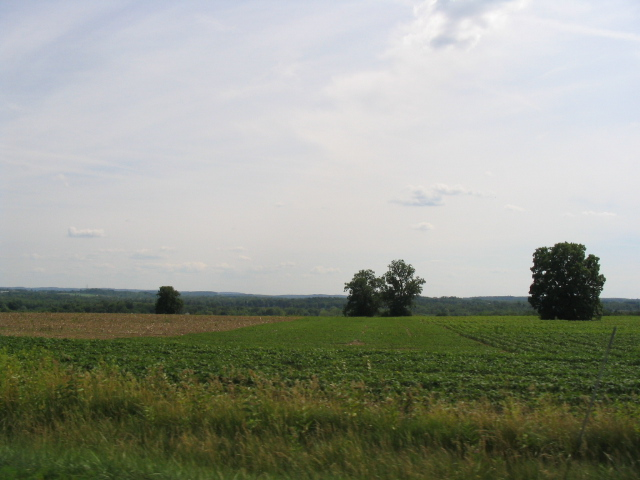
The rolling hills of Lysander between Baldwinsville and Syracuse

The town was part of the former Central New York Military Tract. It was first settled by outsiders circa 1797. The Town of Lysander was formed in 1794 from the northern townships of the Military Tract. Lysander was later reduced by the creation of the Towns of Hannibal (1806) and Cicero (1807). Lysander was reduced again on the formation of Oswego County in 1816.

== Geography ==
According to the United States Census Bureau, the town has a total area of 64.6 square miles (167 km^{2}), of which 61.9 square miles (160 km^{2}) is land and 2.7 square miles (7.0 km^{2}) (4.18%) is water.

The northern town line is the border of Oswego County and the western town boundary is the border of Cayuga County. The southern town line is defined by the Erie Canal-Seneca River complex. Cross Lake is located on the western border of Lysander. The Oswego River marks part of the eastern town line. The Oswego, Seneca, and Oneida Rivers join at the eastern town line.

New York State Route 370, West Genesee Road, is an east–west highway in the southern part of Lysander. New York State Route 48 is a highway in the center of the town. New York State Route 31 intersects NY-370 in the southeastern part of Lysander. New York State Route 690 is a major highway leading out of the southern part of Lysander.

== Demographics ==
Historical population
Census	Pop.	Note	%±
1820	1,723		—
1830	3,228		87.3%
1840	4,306		33.4%
1850	5,833		35.5%
1860	4,741		−18.7%
1870	4,944		4.3%
1880	4,903		−0.8%
1890	5,163		5.3%
1900	4,838		−6.3%
1910	4,509		−6.8%
1920	4,725		4.8%
1930	4,849		2.6%
1940	5,207		7.4%
1950	6,798		30.6%
1960	10,225		50.4%
1970	11,968		17.0%
1980	13,897		16.1%
1990	16,346		17.6%
2000	19,285		18.0%
2010	21,759		12.8%
2020	23,074		6.0%
U.S. Decennial Census

As of the census of 2000, there were 19,285 people, 7,139 households, and 5,404 families residing in the town. The population density was 311.5 inhabitants per square mile (120.3/km^{2}). There were 7,448 housing units at an average density of 120.3 per square mile (46.4/km^{2}). The racial makeup of the town was 96.89% White, 0.73% African American, 0.29% Native American, 1.00% Asian, 0.02% Pacific Islander, 0.24% from other races, and 0.82% from two or more races. Hispanic or Latino of any race were 0.78% of the population.

There were 7,139 households, out of which 39.8% had children under the age of 18 living with them, 64.5% were married couples living together, 7.9% had a female householder with no husband present, and 24.3% were non-families. 19.9% of all households were made up of individuals, and 7.7% had someone living alone who was 65 years of age or older. The average household size was 2.70 and the average family size was 3.12.

In the town, the population was spread out, with 28.8% under the age of 18, 5.5% from 18 to 24, 30.0% from 25 to 44, 25.4% from 45 to 64, and 10.3% who were 65 years of age or older. The median age was 38 years. For every 100 females, there were 97.7 males. For every 100 females age 18 and over, there were 93.3 males.

The median income for a household in the town was $59,128, and the median income for a family was $67,539. Males had a median income of $47,057 versus $29,164 for females. The per capita income for the town was $26,187. About 2.5% of families and 3.8% of the population were below the poverty line, including 3.5% of those under age 18 and 5.2% of those age 65 or over.

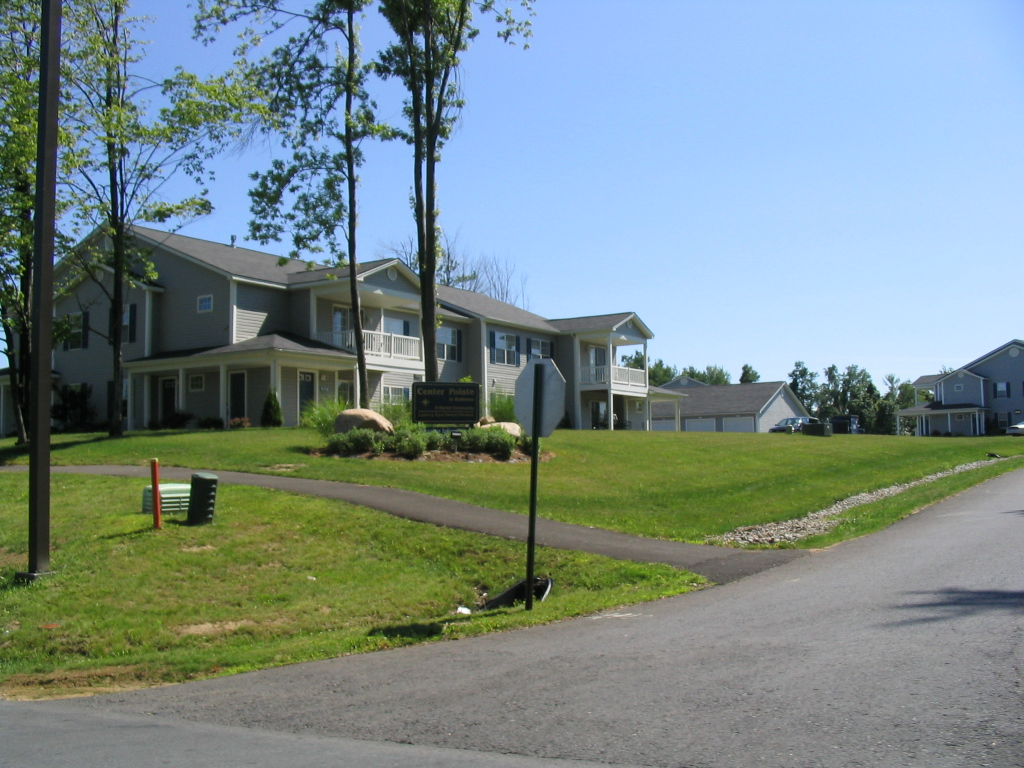
Apartments in Lysander just outside Baldwinsville

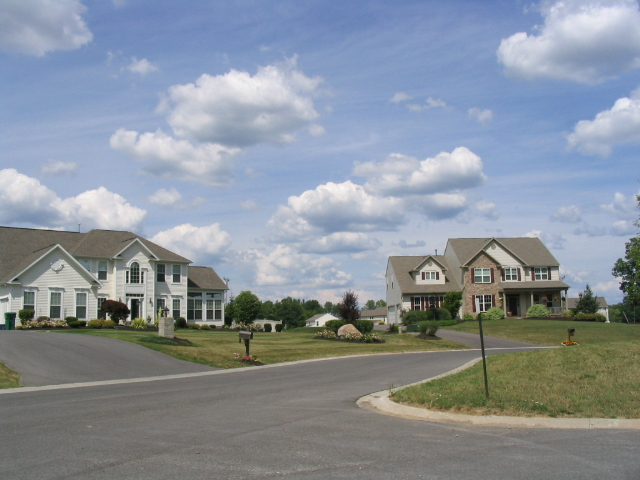
Neighborhood in eastern Lysander

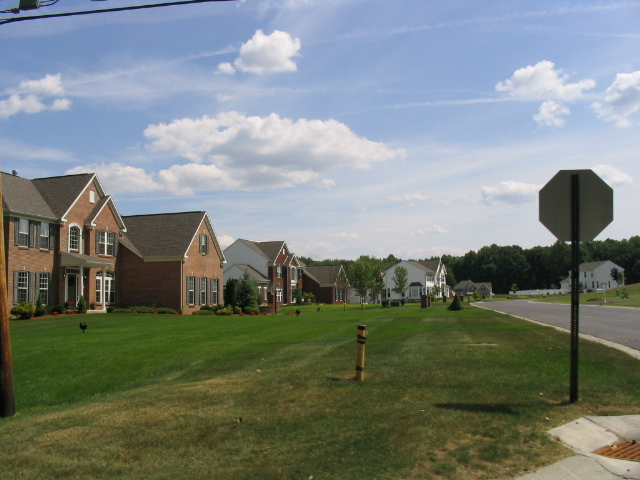
Single family homes in Lysander

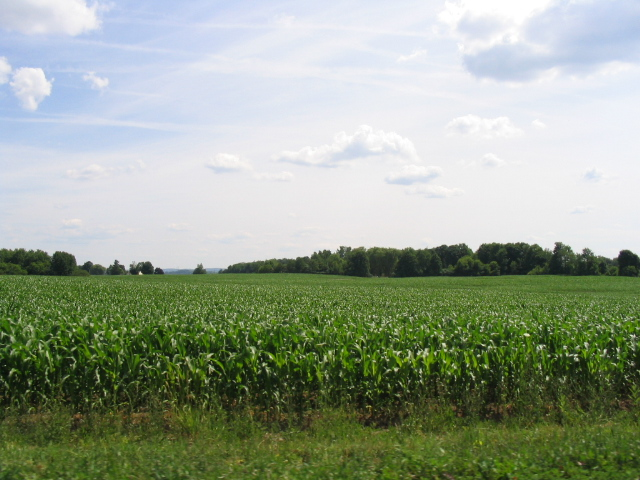
Farmland in Lysander

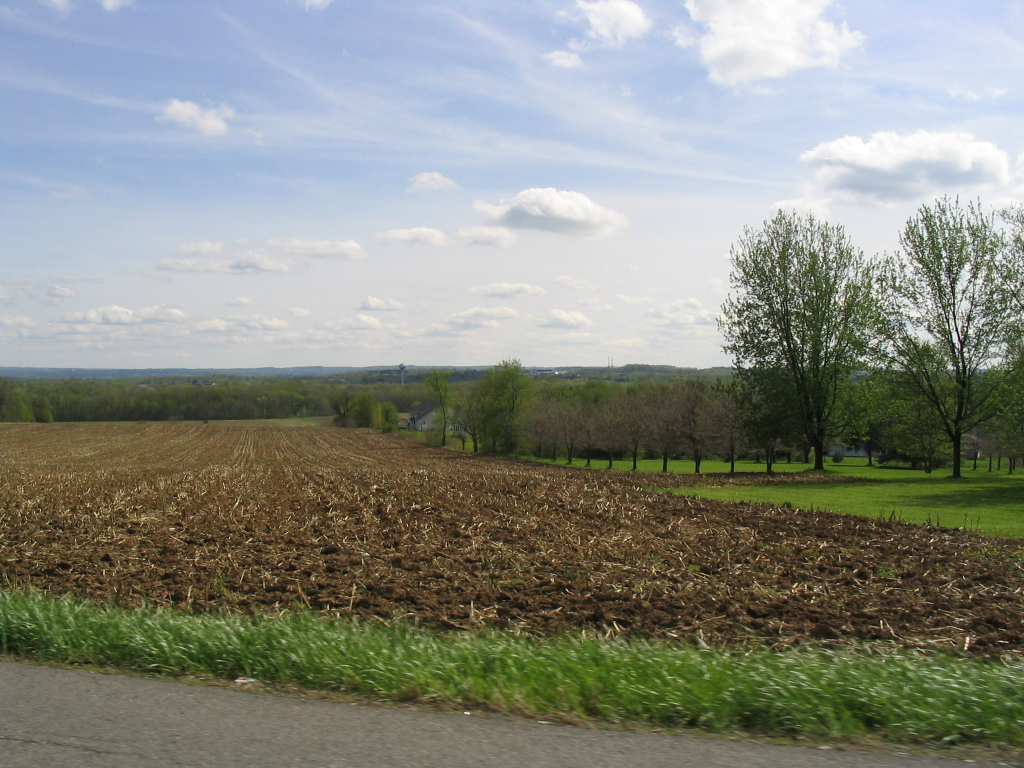
Lysander countryside in the spring

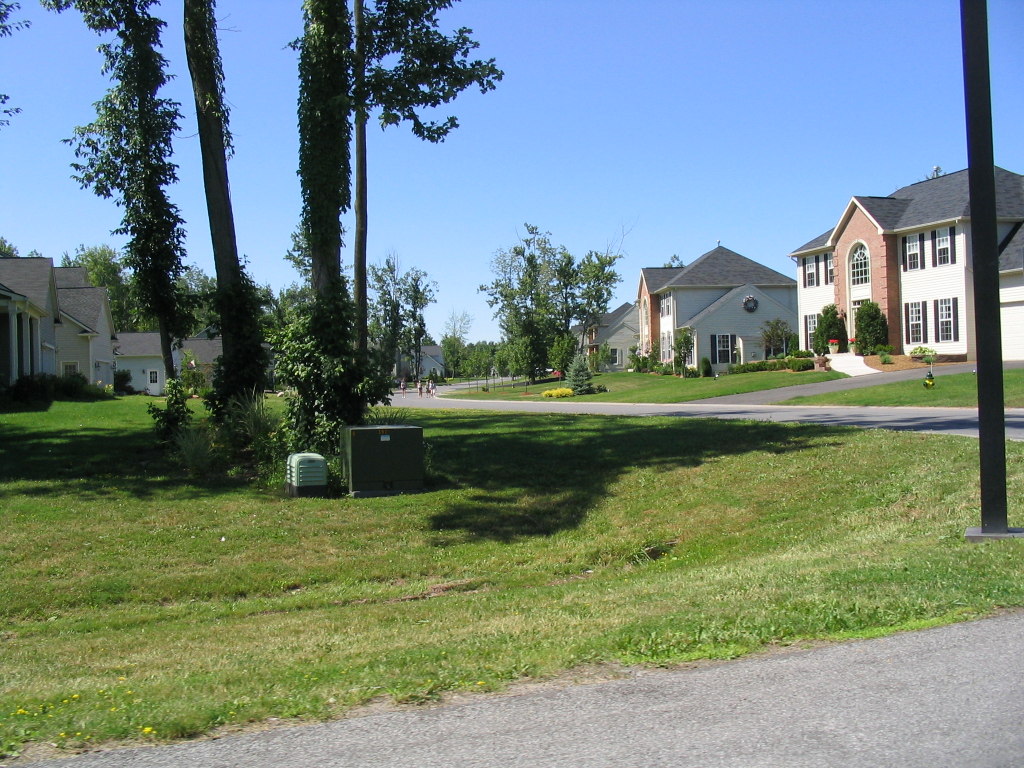
Neighborhood in Radisson planned community

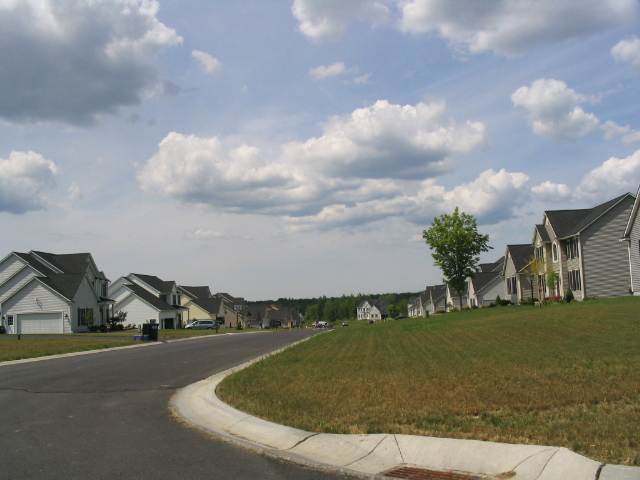
New homes just outside Baldwinsville

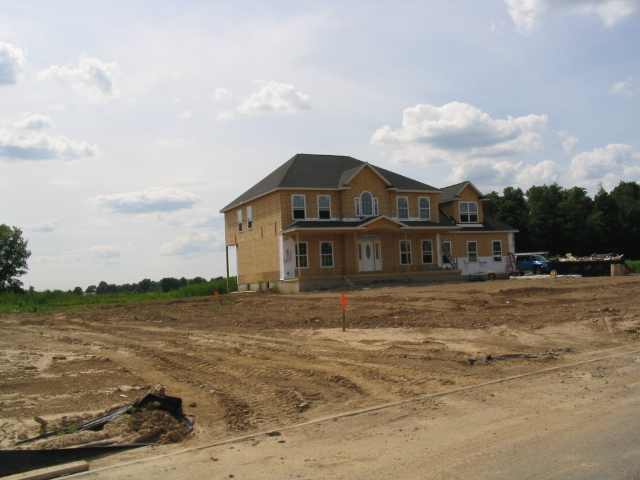
New home under construction in Lysander

== Communities and locations in the Town of Lysander ==
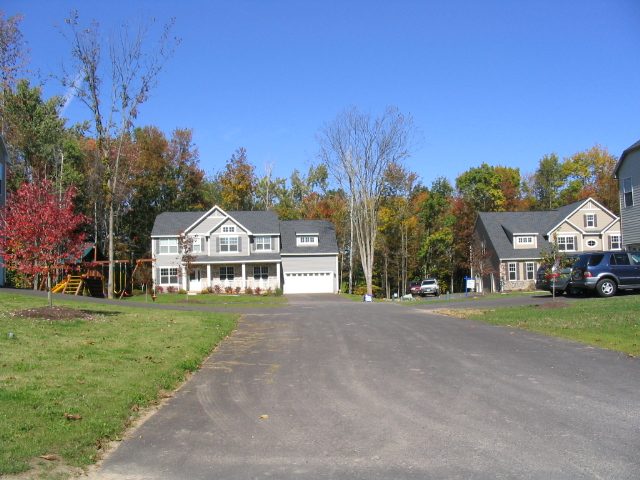
A typical neighborhood in the planned community of Radisson within Lysander

- Baird Corners – A hamlet in the northwestern part of the town on Plainville Rd, a continuation of Oswego County Road 8
- Baldwinsville – The northern part of the Village of Baldwinsville is in the south part of the town, and is divided by the Seneca River/Erie Canal.
- Belgium – A hamlet by the eastern town line on NY-31.
- Cold Springs – A hamlet in the southeastern part of town on NY-370.
- Jacksonville – A hamlet in the northern part of the town.
- Jack's Reef – A hamlet in the southwestern section of town along the Seneca River. This hamlet is trisected with the towns of Lysander, Elbridge and Van Buren.
- Hortontown – A farm in the central part of the town.
- Lamson – A hamlet in the northern part of the town.
- Little Utica – A hamlet in the northern section of the town.
- Lysander – The hamlet of Lysander near the western town line on Plainville Rd, a continuation of Oswego County Road 8
- Beaver Lake – A lake west of Hortontown.
- Plainville – A hamlet in the southwestern part of the town on NY-370.
- Radisson – A hamlet and planned community in the eastern part of the town.
- Red Rock – A hamlet in the southeastern part of town along the Seneca River/Erie Canal.
- Seneca Estates – An upscale neighborhood of approximately 120 homes adjacent to Rt. 370 and the Seneca River, 2 miles (3.2 km) west of the Village of Baldwinsville. The only neighborhood in the town with its own private marina, boat launch, fuel station and head pump-out facility.
- West Phoenix – A hamlet in the northeastern corner of Lysander.
- Wrights Corners – A location east of Lamson, located on NY-48.

== Notable people ==
- Esther Baker Steele (1835–1911), educator, author, traveler, philanthropist
