= Virginia Loney =

Lusitania survivor and socialite (1899-1975)

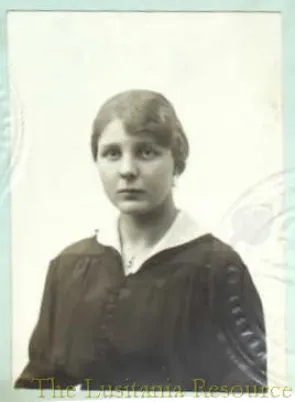
- Virginia Loney, c. 1915
- Born: May 19, 1899; Skaneateles, New York
- Died: April 4, 1975 (aged 75); Southampton, New York
- Known for: Lusitania survivor and socialite

Virginia Bruce Loney (May 19, 1899 – April 4, 1975) was a member of American high society, primarily in the state of New York. She came from the long-established, wealthy Loney and Brown families, which produced large landowners and lawyers.

Loney became known in 1915, age 15, as one of the youngest heiresses in United States history, when she inherited her parents' entire fortune after their death. The American media shaped Loney's image as a "poor little rich girl," a title otherwise more commonly applied to Shirley Temple, Mary Pickford, and Gloria Vanderbilt. Later, her marriage to aviator Robert H. Gamble, and especially the protracted divorce battle, which included the kidnapping of her two children by their own father, made headlines.

== Family and origins ==
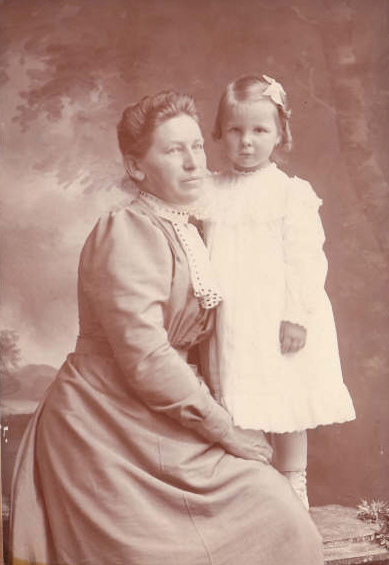
Virginia Loney (r) with Elise Bouteiller (l), her nurse, c. 1902

Virginia Loney was the only child of Allen Donellan Loney (born October 20, 1871) and Catharine Wolfe Brown (born April 30, 1877). The lived in New Rochelle, New York with eight servants. Allen was a wealthy stockbroker, landowner, and horse breeder, originally from Baltimore, Maryland. He was the son of William Amos Loney (1822–1914), who had made a fortune as a wholesale trader and real estate agent, and his wife, Alice Louise Allen (1844–1907). Catharine was the daughter of George Bruce Brown and Virginia Greenway McKesson. Virginia's cousin was motor racing driver David Bruce-Bown and a great-niece of lawyer Henry Donellan Loney.

The Loney family regularly spent their summers in Skaneateles, New York, where Virginia was born on May 19, 1899. There, they lived on the Roseleigh estate, which Virginia's paternal grandparents had built. Virginia Loney learned to swim in Skaneateles Lake. All three were skilled horsemen. When in New York City, the family stayed at the Gotham Hotel. Most of the time, Virginia lived with her parents at Guilsborough House, a country estate in Northampton in the East Midlands, where the family hosted dinners, fox hunts, and horse shows. The Loneys traveled extensively, regularly crossing the Atlantic Ocean on the most popular ocean liners of the time, including the RMS Cedric, SS Amerika, RMS Campania, SS George Washington, and RMS Mauretania. They were also aboard the RMS Olympic when it received a distress call from its stricken sister ship the Titanic in April 1912.

== On the Lusitania ==
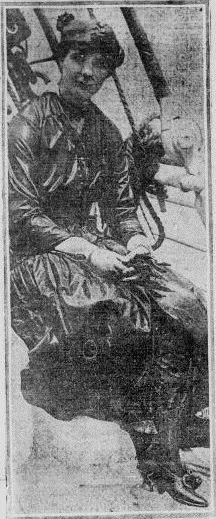
Loney returning to the USA aboard St. Paul after the Lusitania disaster, 1915

After the outbreak of the World War I, the Loneys left England and returned to New York in September 1914 aboard the White Star Line's RMS Celtic. Allen Loney soon returned to Europe to assist the British Ambulance Corps, which was responsible for transporting wounded soldiers. He provided three of his own vehicles to transport injured soldiers from the front to nearby field hospitals or other medical facilities. Catharine Loney also wanted to help and decided in the spring of 1915 to travel to England to care for the wounded in a convalescent home.

When Allen Loney learned that Catharine and Virginia intended to take the RMS Lusitania to Liverpool, he booked the next ship to the United States, the Adriatic, to accompany his wife and daughter. On April 21, 1915, they booked suites B-85 and B-87 and boarded the luxury liner in New York on May 1 as first-class passengers. The family was accompanied by Virginia's French governess, Elise Bouteiller, who had worked for the family for many years. On board, the family was often joined by Canadian businessman Joseph H. Charles, president of the Musson Book Company in Toronto, and his daughter Doris. Bouteiller had immigrated to America from France in 1887.

When the ship was torpedoed and sunk by a German U-boat off the Irish coast on May 7, Virginia was in her cabin. She ran into the corridor and was carried by the forward motion of the crowd to the boat deck. On the port side, she found her parents with Alfred Gwynne Vanderbilt. Her father was distributing life jackets to the surrounding passengers but kept none for himself. When the crowded port-side boat No. 14 was about to be lowered, Allen Loney insisted that his daughter get in. After some protest, she relented and allowed Alfred Vanderbilt to help her into the boat. No. 14 was the last boat to leave the Lusitania; it was only a few feet from the ship when it sank. The Lusitania's motion caused No. 14 to rock, throwing its occupants into the water and capsizing. When she resurfaced and turned back to the ship, she could see her parents waving to her from the sloping boat deck. Virginia Loney, along with dozens of others, was caught in the ship's suction and pulled underwater. When she resurfaced, the Lusitania was gone. She was pulled into another lifeboat and taken to Queenstown on a fishing boat with other survivors. Her parents and Elise Boutellier perished in the sinking; their bodies were never recovered. Alfred Vanderbilt was also among the numerous victims.

== "Poor rich girl" ==
After spending her 16th birthday without her parents at Guilsborough House, Virginia returned to the United States in June 1915 aboard the St. Paul, initially living at her uncle George McKesson Brown's West Neck Farms estate in Huntington, Long Island. Shortly before her death, Catharine Loney had drawn up a new will making Virginia the sole heir to the family fortune, valued at more than $1.5 million (in the currency of the time, a very large sum in 1915), upon her turning 21. Virginia also received assets worth $45,000, her mother's jewelry that had survived the Lusitania sinking, $12,000 from a great-aunt's trust fund, and a car. Several American newspapers, most notably The New York Times, reported on Virginia as a "poor, rich girl" and publicized her story.

Virginia's mother's will named Mary Bose Chamberlaine, a single cousin of Allen Loney, as her godmother and legal guardian. Mary took charge of Virginia's upbringing and went to court to claim the expenses she believed Virginia was entitled to. Before the United States Supreme Court, presided over by Justice Pendleton, she requested $25,000 annually in October 1915 to "guarantee Virginia the lifestyle she had been accustomed to from birth as a member of a higher social class." This sum represented one-third of her parents' annual income and included expenses for education, furnishings, household duties, summer vacations and travel, as well as the costs of a maid, three servants, and a car with a chauffeur.

Virginia then lived with Mary and Mary's widowed sister, Rebecca Chamberlaine Fabens, in an apartment at 850 Park Avenue in New York City. Several years later, she also received $26,700 from the German American Mixed Claims Commission for the loss of her parents. This panel, chaired by Judge Edwin B. Parker, handled the compensation claims of survivors of the Lusitania disaster. George Brown received $15,450 for the loss of his only sister, and Mary Chamberlaine was awarded $1,235.

== First marriage and divorce scandal ==
In December 1917, the engagement of 18-year-old Virginia to Robert Howard Gamble, ten years her senior, a Yale graduate, stockbroker, and aviator from Jacksonville, Florida, was announced. He was a member of the Naval Aviation Corps in Jacksonville and served in the United States Navy Reserve. The wedding took place on April 27, 1918, in New York City. The couple subsequently settled in Chevy Chase, Maryland, and had two children: Robert Howard Gamble, Jr., and Catharine Bruce Gamble.

The marriage failed; Virginia filed for divorce in Paris in April 1923. In court, she accused him of "indifference" toward her and cited this as grounds for divorce. Virginia and the children returned to America aboard the RMS Aquitania. In September 1923, Robert followed them to Huntington and, without Virginia's knowledge, took the two children to Jacksonville. Virginia reported them kidnapped. Robert Gamble refused to hand the children over to his ex-wife and announced his intention to obtain custody in Florida. In November, she sued him in the Supreme Court for $232,000 in damages and also requested a court-ordered detention order before the Commercial Frauds Court, presided over by George W. Simpson, accusing her ex-husband of theft and fraud. She accused him of stealing $50,000 worth of stocks and securities after the divorce. The scandal made headlines in the USA in 1923. A custody agreement was eventually reached, and Virginia got her children back in November 1924.

== Second marriage and later life ==
On January 29, 1926, Virginia married Paul Abbott, who, like her, was divorced. Paul was a graduated from the French Military School in Fontainebleau and the son of Henry H. Abbott, a lawyer and vice president of the Maidstone Club in East Hampton, New York. They lived together at 1115 Fifth Avenue. Paul had been married to Elise Everett from 1920 to 1926. Virginia had one son with him, Paul Abbott, Jr.

Of their children, Catherine Gamble married William Ray Kitchel in 1940. The marriage ended in divorce; Catherine married Lieutenant Commander John R. Chapin, Jr. in 1947, while William married Countess de Ganay in Connecticut in 1948. Robert Gamble, Jr. married in New Mexico in 1942. Paul Abbott, Jr. married Lucretia L. Bogert in 1954.

In 1956, Virginia Loney was among the approximately 30 Lusitania survivors who were interviewed about their experiences by the American author couple Adolph A. Hoehling and Mary Duprey Hoehling for their non-fiction book The Last Voyage of the Lusitania, one of the fundamental works on the subject.

Virginia's husband, Paul, died in April 1971. She herself died four years later at the age of 75 in Southampton, New York. Catharine, her daughter, died before Virginia did.
