= Brook Farm (Skaneateles, New York) =

Historic house in New York, United States

- U.S. National Register of Historic Places
- Location within New York Location within the United States
- Nearest city: Skaneateles, New York
- Coordinates: 42°54′58″N 76°25′47″W
- Area: 23.27 acres (94,200 m^{2})
- Built: 1902
- Architect: Loss, Hulburt; Platt, Charles
- Architectural style: Colonial Revival
- NRHP reference No.: 03001304
- Added to NRHP: December 18, 2003

Brook Farm overlooks Skaneateles Lake and was built in 1902. It includes Colonial Revival style architecture.

It was listed on the National Register of Historic Places in 2003.
