= John Dodgson Barrow =

American artist (1824–1906)

John Dodgson Barrow (November 24, 1824 – December 7, 1906), primarily known for his landscape paintings and portraits, has been regarded as belonging to the second generation of the Hudson River School. His subjects were frequently Central New York scenes, mostly around Skaneateles, New York, where he lived and worked until moving to New York City. A non-profit gallery is devoted to his work inside the library in the village of Skaneateles.

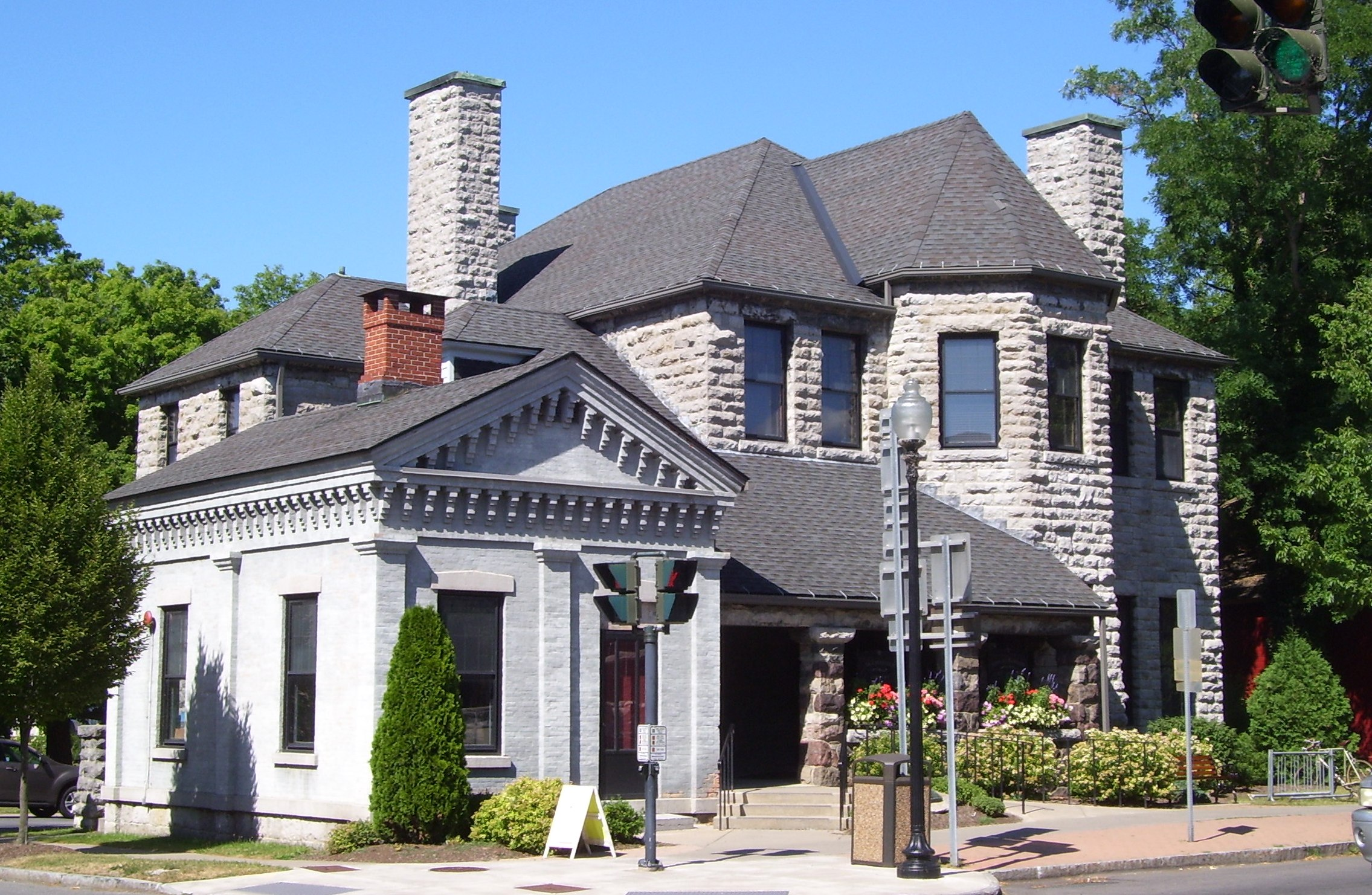
The John D. Barrow Art Gallery in Skaneatles Library.

== Early life and education ==
Barrow was born in New York City on 24 November 1824 to John Barrow III and Elizabeth Moode Prior Barrow. His family included sister Rebecca Haydock Barrow, four brothers - William, Charles Henry, Edmund Prior Barrow, George and George's wife, Caroline Tyler Barrow. He was the oldest of the 10 children. His family moved to Skaneateles in 1839. At the age of 15 he moved in with relatives in North East England and received lessons in painting. At the age of 19, he rejoined his family in Skaneateles, N.Y. and continued painting. Barrow was never married.

== Career ==
Barrow was influenced by both the Hudson River School of painters and the romantic New England poets at early age. After finishing his studies in England, he returned to Skaneateles and them moved to New York City to begin his career.

Barrow joined the American Art-Union in 1850, and exhibited his first painting at the National Academy of Design in 1852. Barrow opened his New York City studio in 1856, at the age of 32, in Greenwich Village, near that of Charles Loring Elliott and other Hudson Valley School landscape painters. He was influenced by George Inness while he lived in New York City.

Between 1852 and 1879, his paintings were included in exhibits at the Union League Club of New York City, the Pennsylvania Academy of the Fine Arts in Philadelphia, Boston Athenæum, and in 19 Annual Exhibitions of the National Academy. Most notably, Barrow painted Abraham Lincoln before the Cooper Union address in New York City in February 1860.

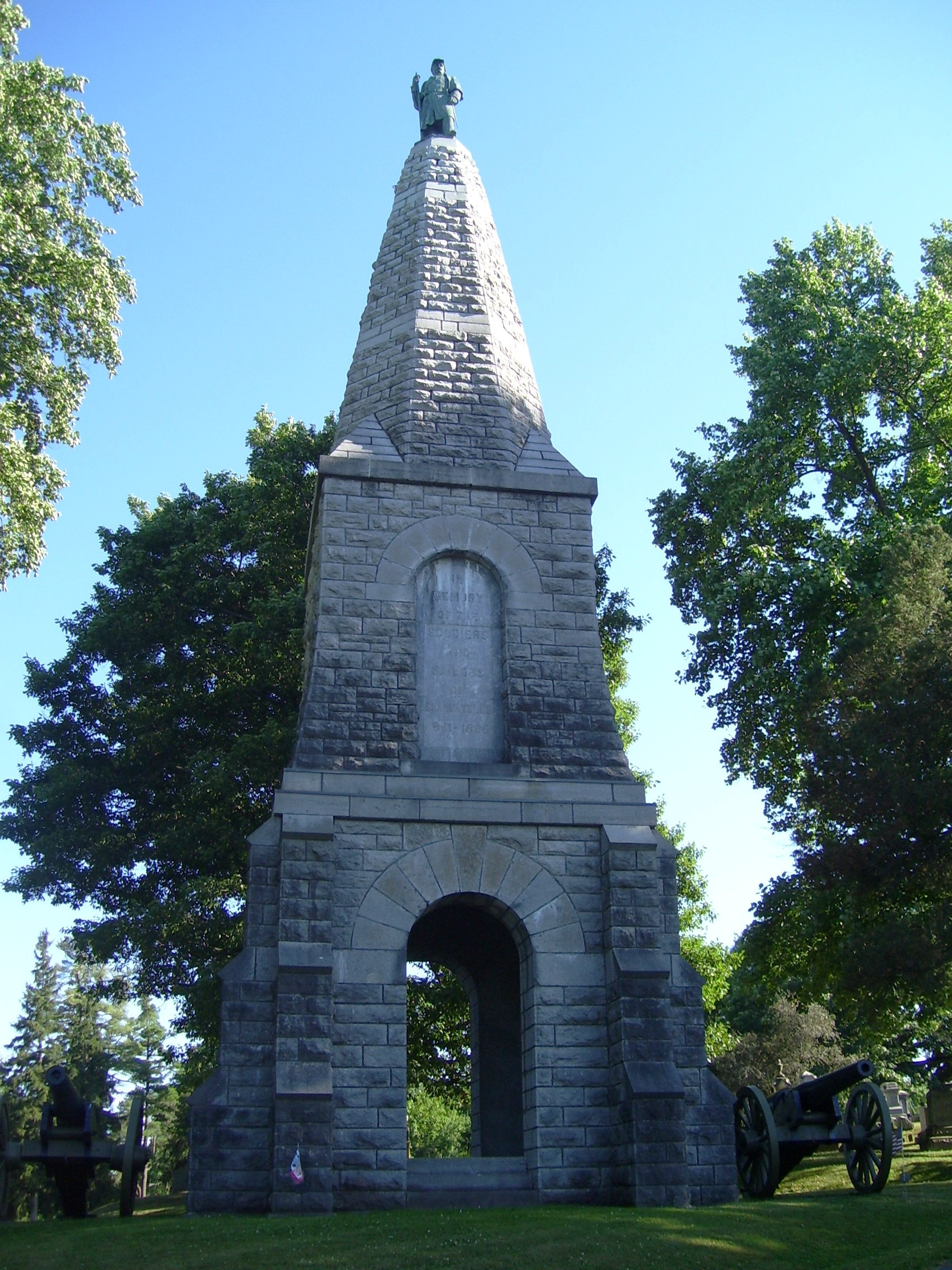
Soldiers' and Sailors' Monument, Lake View Cemetery, Skaneateles, New York (1895)

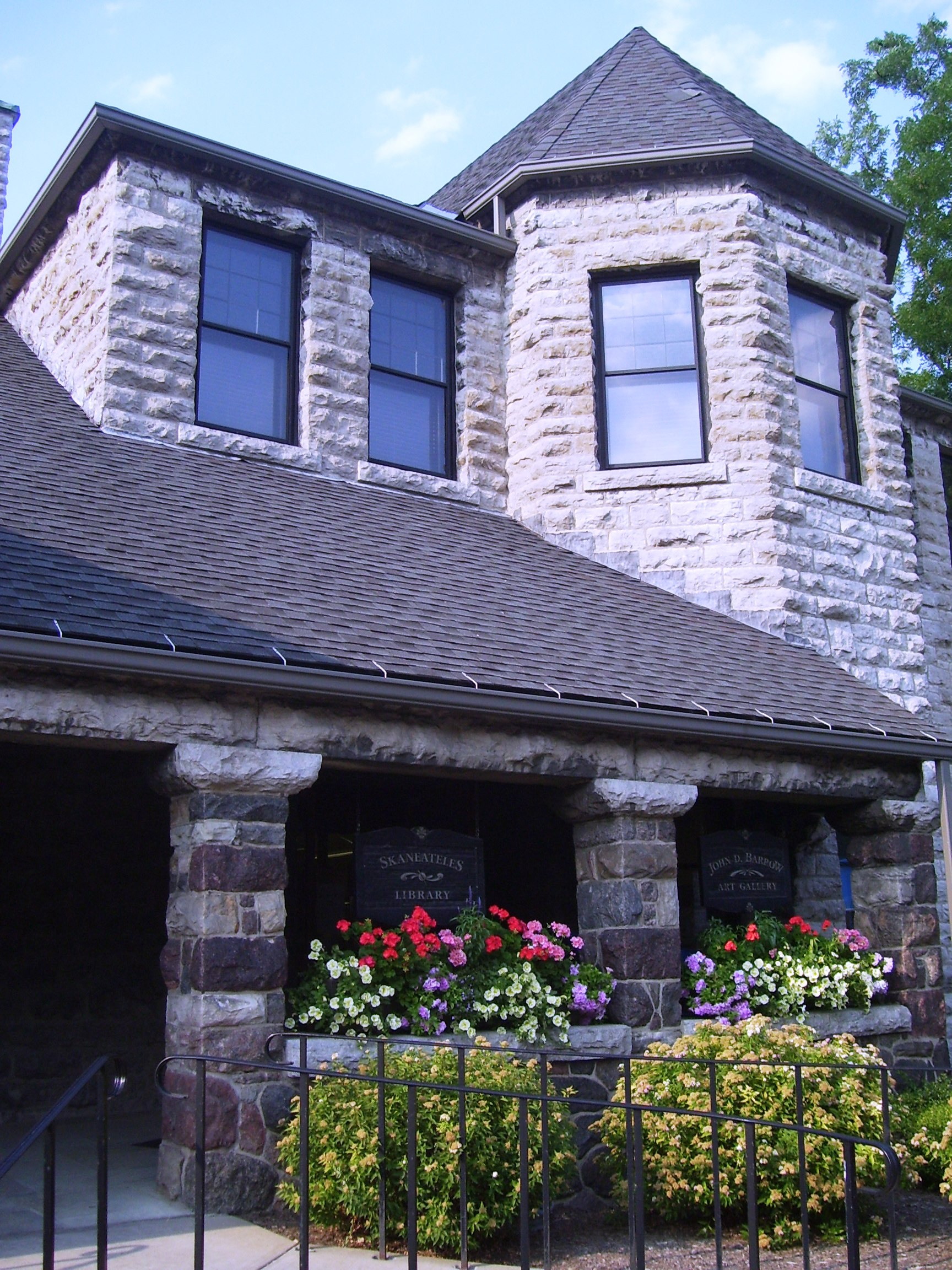
The entrance to the John D. Barrow Art Gallery is through the Skaneateles Library

While most of his income came from commissioned portraits, Barrow also drew landscapes covering pastoral life. Many of these oil paintings focused on scenes around the Skaneateles lake and the surrounding areas, where Barrow lived during the summers.

Barrow also painted portraits of prominent citizens in the Skaneateles area. He presented some of his paintings to Syracuse public libraries. He designed the Skaneateles Soldiers' and Sailors' Monument (1895) at Lake View Cemetery. He also designed the addition to the village's public library that houses his art gallery.

On 8 October 1900, Barrow donated his gallery to Skaneateles library along with financial assistance for erecting a building. Today, the gallery contains 426 paintings, most in the original gilded frames, of which around 300 are on display at any one time.

=== Other activities ===
Barrow retired early and returned permanently to Skaneateles in 1877. In the same year, he was appointed to the faculty of Syracuse University as a professor of painting in the college of fine arts. He served for two years.

He also served as the president of the Skaneateles Savings Bank and director of Onondaga Historical Association until his death.

On July 4, 1876, John D. Barrow delivered centennial address in Skaneateles recounting the history of the village up to that time. In 1891, he had it printed in Syracuse as a 20-page book.

Just before his death he published a 30 poem collection titled Around Skaneateles Lake which was edited by William Martin Beauchamp.

== Death ==
Barrow died in Skaneateles on December 7, 1906 at the age of 83. He left his estate to his two sisters.
