= New York State Route 31A (disambiguation) =

New York State Route 31A is an east–west state highway in Orleans and Monroe Counties in New York, United States, that was established in the mid-1930s.

New York State Route 31A may also refer to:

- New York State Route 31A (Onondaga County), assigned from the mid-1920s to 1930
- New York State Route 31A (western Niagara County), assigned from the late 1920s to the mid-1930s
