= Jordan Village Historic District =

Jordan Village Historic District may refer to:

- Jordan Village Historic District (Waterford, Connecticut), listed on the NRHP in Connecticut
- Jordan Village Historic District (Jordan, New York), listed on the NRHP in Onondaga County, New York

== See also ==
- Jordan Historic District, listed on the NRHP in Minnesota
