= New York State Route 317 =

State highway in Onondaga County, New York, US

New York State Route 317
- Map of Cayuga and Onondaga counties with NY 317 highlighted in red

Route information
- Maintained by NYSDOT
- Length: 3.12 mi (5.02 km)
- Existed: April 1, 2003–present

Major junctions
- South end: NY 5 in Elbridge
- North end: NY 31 in Jordan

Location
- Country: United States
- State: New York
- Counties: Onondaga

Highway system
- New York Highways; Interstate; US; State; Reference; Parkways
← NY 316	→ NY 318
← NY 31B	NY 31C	→ NY 31D

New York State Route 317 (NY 317) is a 3.12-mile (5.02 km) long state highway within the town of Elbridge in Onondaga County, New York, in the United States. It begins at an intersection with NY 5 in the village of Elbridge and ends at a junction with NY 31 in the village of Jordan. The highway is known locally as Jordan Road and Main Street.

The route was once part of the Jordan and Skaneateles Plank Road, a plank road established by a New York State Legislature charter in the 1850s. It spanned a short distance from Jordan to the village of Skaneateles and was a successor to the Auburn and Syracuse Railroad, which ceased operations in 1834. However, the plank road lasted less than two decades. In 1866, the Legislature granted another charter, this time creating the Skaneateles Railroad and its corporation, which bought out most of the plank road company.

The alignment of NY 317 south of Jordan was originally County Route 105 (CR 105), a highway maintained by Onondaga County. The highway paralleled Valley Drive, which was designated as New York State Route 31C in the 1930s and located on the opposite (western) side of Skaneateles Creek. In 2002, heavy flooding of the creek washed out a portion of Valley Drive. A bill to transfer maintenance of most of Valley Drive from the state of New York to local governments in exchange for maintenance of CR 105 was subsequently passed by the New York State Legislature and took effect April 1, 2003, at which time the NY 31C designation was removed. The former CR 105 and the portion of former NY 31C in Jordan were designated as NY 317 at the same time.

== Route description ==
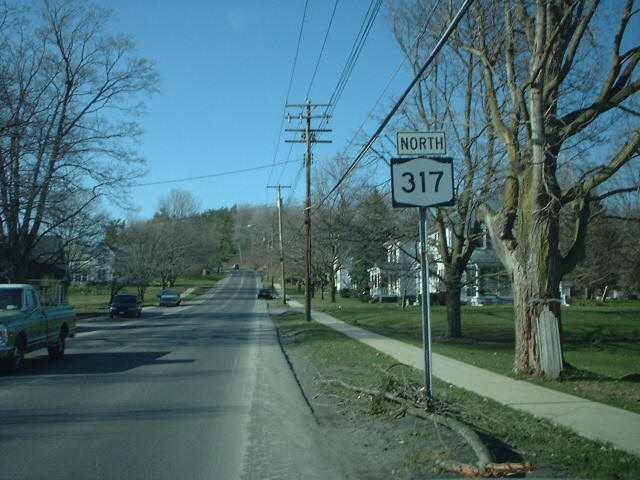
First northbound reassurance marker on NY 317

NY 317 begins at an intersection with NY 5 (Main Street) and South Street (CR 122) in the Onondaga County village of Elbridge. The route heads northward from the central intersection, passing a small commercial lot to the west and several residential homes to the north and west. Just to the west of the highway is Valley Drive, formerly NY 31C, which parallels NY 317 for its entire length. Separating NY 317 and Valley Drive is Skaneateles Creek, which runs between the two highways.

After a short distance in the village, NY 317, known as Jordan Road, continues northwest into the surrounding town of Elbridge, where roadside development ends and the highway passes through predominantly open fields. It loosely parallels Skaneateles Creek, turning slightly northward and northwestward to match curves in the waterway. It is during the latter northwest–southeast stretch that Valley Drive ends at a cul-de-sac amongst the woods that line the creek.

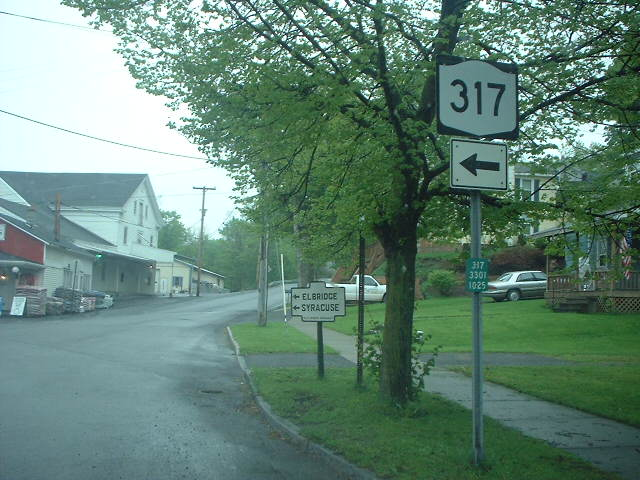
NY 317 southbound at the junction of Elbridge and South Main Streets in Jordan

A short distance to the northwest, Valley Drive resumes near Crego Road. On NY 317, the highway passes Maple Grove Cemetery, a small graveyard located in Elbridge. After this comes the intersection with Crego Road, one of two connectors between Valley Road and NY 317. NY 317 then intersects with Whiting Road (CR 183), which heads to the east, before entering the village of Jordan.

In Jordan, NY 317 becomes Elbridge Street and turns west to intersect the northern terminus of Valley Drive. The highway proceeds through the southern portion of the village and crosses Skaneateles Creek to reach a junction with South Main Street. NY 317 turns north onto Main Street and has intersections with Mechanic Street (CR 60) and North Hamilton Street (designated as CR 271 south of Jordan) before it terminates at a junction with NY 31 north of the village center but within the village limits.

== History ==
=== Jordan and Skaneateles Plank Road ===
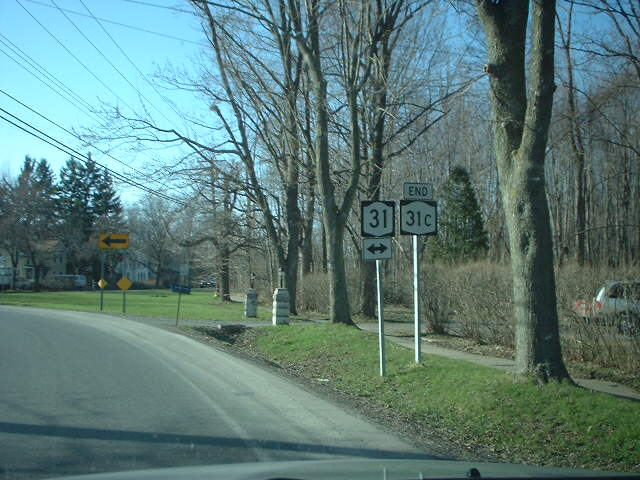
2003 photo of the former northern terminus of NY 31C and current northern terminus of NY 317

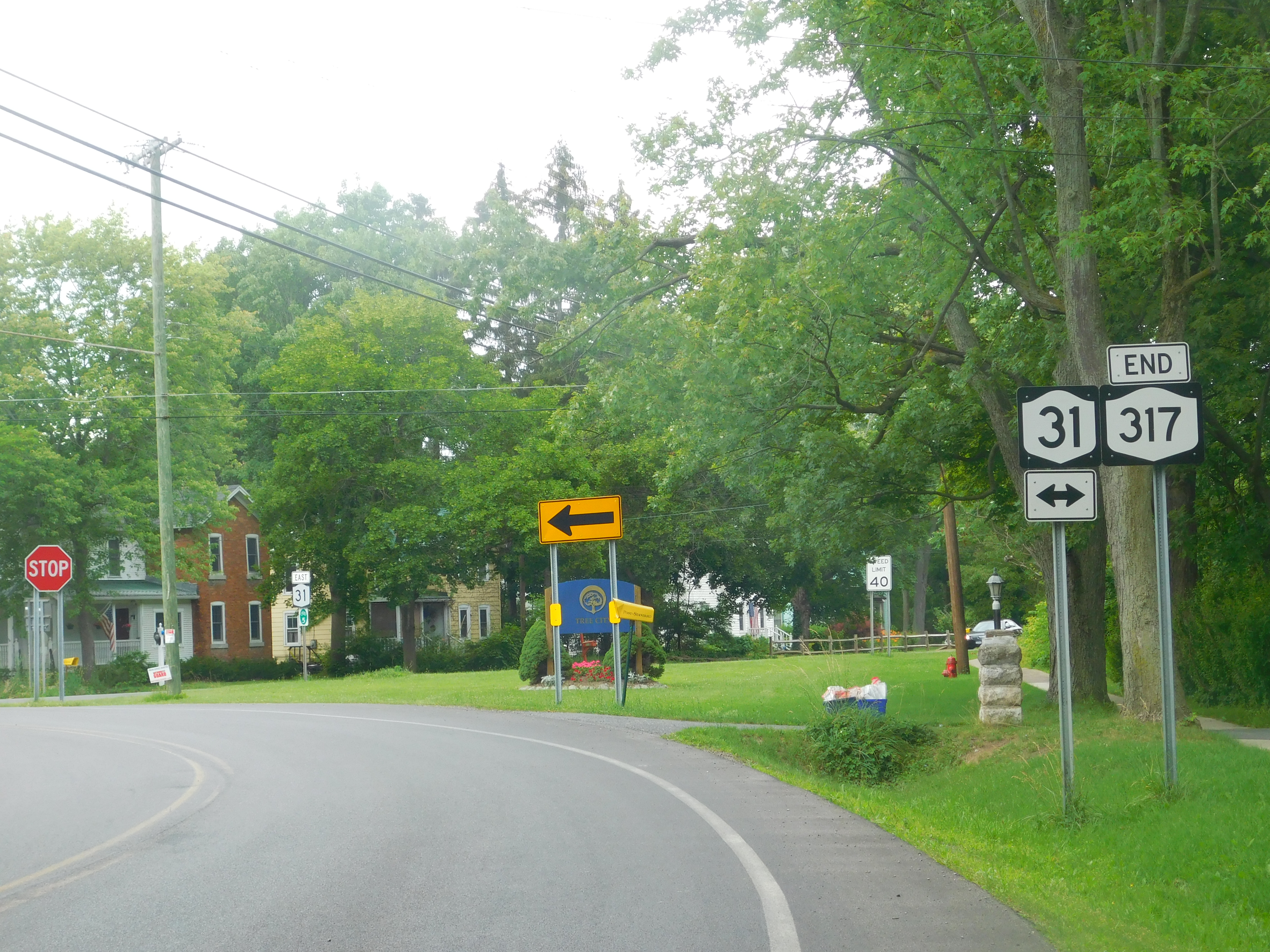
2017 photo of the assembly at the junction. The NY 31C shield has been replaced with one for NY 317.

The modern routing of NY 317 was originally the northern part of the Jordan and Skaneateles Plank Road. Chartered in 1855, the Jordan and Skaneateles Plank Road Company was set to provide a plank road from Jordan southward to Skaneateles. This plank road was constructed in the 1850s in place of the Syracuse and Auburn Railroad and a small railroad from Skaneateles to Skaneateles Junction, two crude railroads that were in the area which had ended service in 1836 and 1850 respectively. On March 25, 1853, the New York State Assembly proposed an additional toll gate to be constructed in Elbridge along the plank road. On June 15, 1853, the bill was passed by the Legislature and went into effect.

Although the plank road company lasted less than two decades, it had its share of controversy. In the January 1853 case of Wilson v. Rochester and Syracuse Railroad Company, Wilson, the plaintiff, was traveling southbound along the plank road through Elbridge. At a grade crossing with railroad tracks, Wilson fell off his horses and wagon upon hitting the tracks. He then fell onto the tracks below and was permanently injured as a result. In 1861, during Jordan & Skaneateles Plank Road Company vs. Morley, the company sued Morley for evading the toll in Elbridge. Morley countered that the road was in disrepair. However, on the plaintiff's side, the toll collector was aware that Morley had passed through the toll gate but took no action to enforce the toll. If Morley had paid, he would have been liable for $62.50 (equivalent to $2187 in 2024).

On April 17, 1866, the plank road company was bought out by the Skaneateles Railroad Company. The state chartered the bill, the railroad was constructed and tolls were to be collected by the railroad company rather than the plank road company.

=== Designation ===
In 1908, Valley Drive, a narrow, winding road along the western bank of Skaneateles Creek in the town of Elbridge, was included in Route 20, an unsigned legislative route extending from Rochester in the west to Elbridge in the east. The highway was gradually taken over by the state of New York, beginning with the segment between the Elbridge and Jordan village lines. This section of Valley Drive was legislatively designated as part of State Highway 487 (SH 487) and added to the state highway system on November 2, 1908. The portion within Elbridge was included in the state highway system on December 7, 1911, as part of SH 5080. The Jordan segment was added to the state highway system as part of SH 5630 sometime after 1920.

Map showing the alignments of NY 31C and NY 317 and the close proximity of the two highways

Valley Drive received its first posted designation in the mid-1920s when it was designated as NY 31A, a spur route of NY 31 that linked NY 31 in Jordan to NY 5 in Elbridge. The designation was short-lived, however, as the route became the northernmost portion of NY 41 in the 1930 renumbering of state highways in New York. NY 41 was truncated to its present northern terminus in Skaneateles c. 1933. Its former routing between Elbridge and Jordan was redesignated as NY 31C.

NY 31C remained unchanged until 2002 when part of Valley Drive was washed out by flooding from the nearby creek. A bill (S6534, 2002) was introduced in the New York State Senate on March 18, 2002, that would transfer ownership and maintenance of CR 105, an alternate route between Jordan and Elbridge on the eastern bank of Skaneateles Creek, from Onondaga County to the New York State Department of Transportation and give Valley Drive to the town of Elbridge and the villages of Jordan and Elbridge. S6534 was passed by the State Senate on April 29 and by the Assembly on June 20. It was signed into law by Governor George Pataki on August 6, 2002, and took effect April 1, 2003.

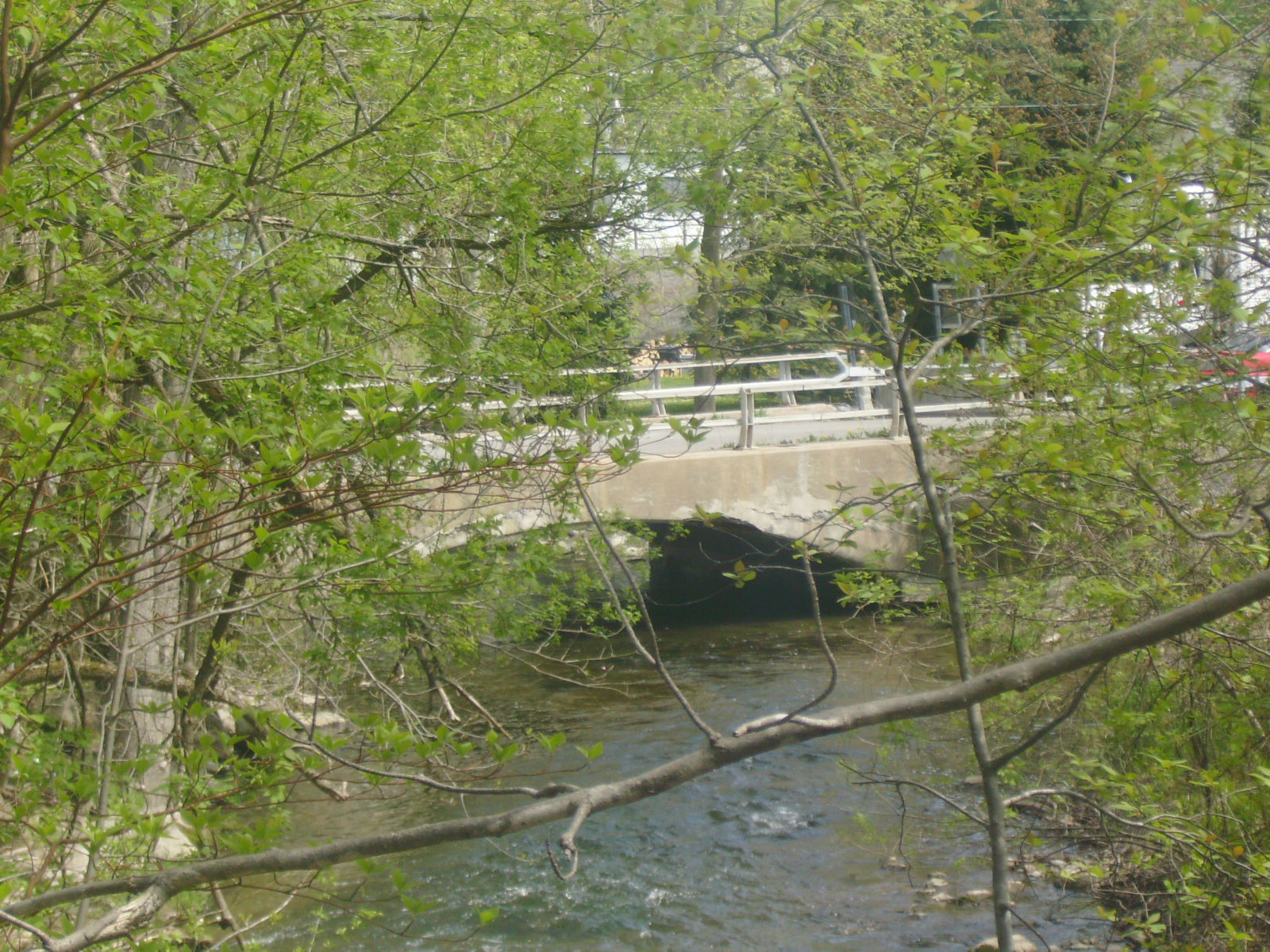
A closed-off bridge that carried Valley Drive (old NY 31C) over Skaneateles Creek. It is scheduled to be demolished in 2014.

On April 1, 2003, NY 31C was effectively renumbered to NY 317 and rerouted south of the intersection of Valley Drive and Elbridge Street in Jordan to follow the former CR 105 to Elbridge. The washed-out section of Valley Drive was never repaired, leaving Valley Drive as two separate dead end streets. The New York State Department of Transportation has made plans to remove the bridge carrying Valley Drive (former NY 31C) over Skaneateles Creek in the town of Elbridge. Demolition of the structure is scheduled to begin in mid-2014 and cost $300,000. Once removed, the bridge, built in 1921, will not be replaced.

== Major intersections ==
The entire route is in Onondaga County.

Location	mi	km	Destinations	Notes
Village of Elbridge	0.00	0.00	NY 5 – Auburn, Camillus, Syracuse	Southern terminus
Town of Elbridge	1.81	2.91	Whiting Road (CR 183)	
Jordan	3.12	5.02	NY 31 – Weedsport, Baldwinsville	Northern terminus
1.000 mi = 1.609 km; 1.000 km = 0.621 mi

== See also ==
- List of county routes in Onondaga County, New York
