= Kelsey–Davey Farm =

- U.S. National Register of Historic Places
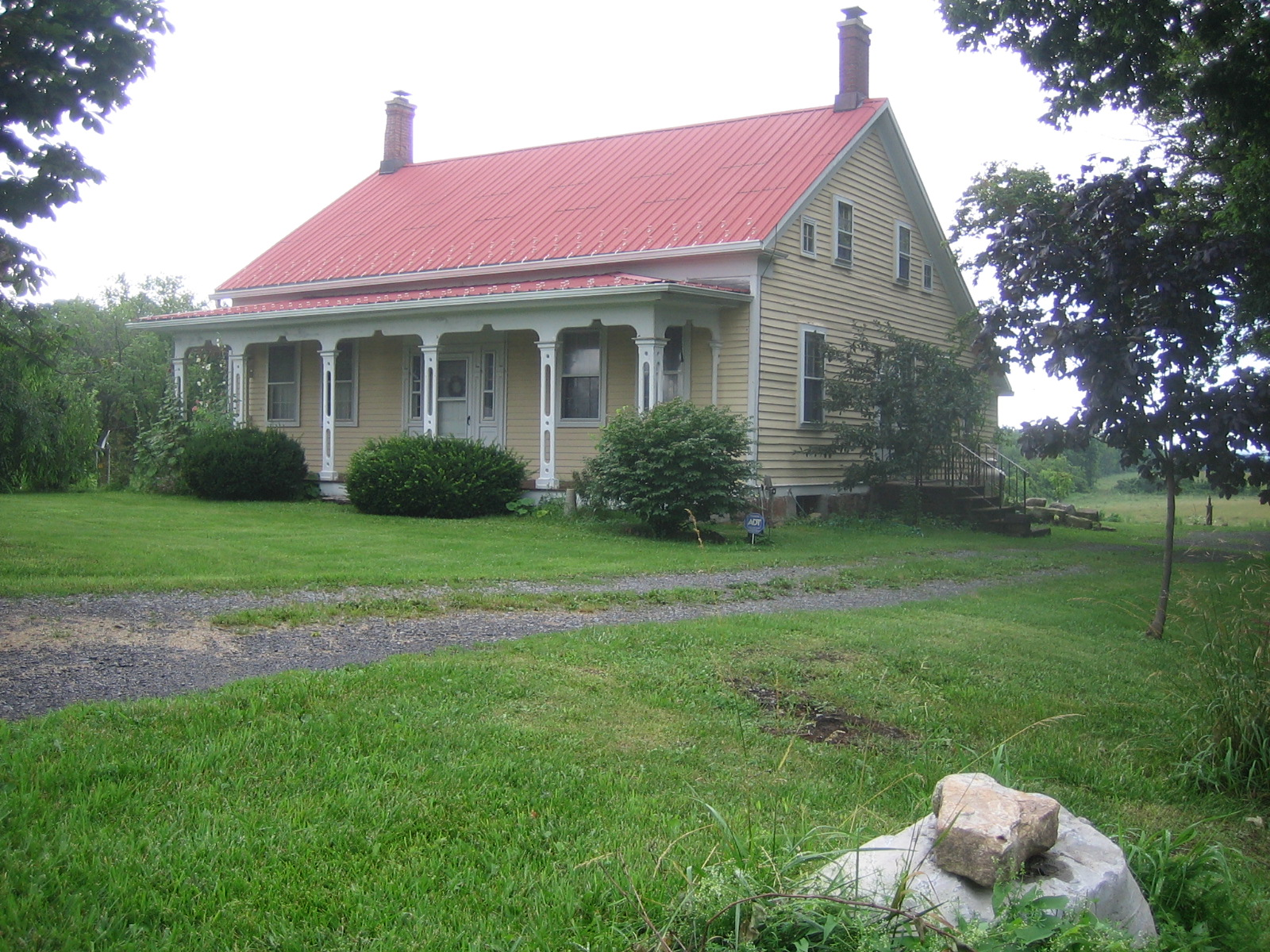

- Location within New York Location within the United States
- Location: 1861 Old Seneca Turnpike, Skaneateles, New York
- Coordinates: 42°58′51.63″N 76°22′45.36″W
- Built: 1810
- Architectural style: Federal, Federal vernacular
- NRHP reference No.: 80004277
- Added to NRHP: April 16, 1980

The Kelsey–Davey Farm is a farm on Old Seneca Turnpike in the town of Skaneateles, New York. The farm dates from 1810. It was listed on the National Register of Historic Places in 1980. The farmhouse is of Federal/Federal vernacular style.

The house is located at 1861 Old Seneca Turnpike, which is just west of the village of Marcellus.

In 2012, it is still owned by members of the Davey family and has been completely restored. The house is quite close to the road and fully visible. The barns are no longer standing, however the ruins of the big horse barn are due west of the house. The first floor of the barn was stone and is still standing. It is visible from the road, although it is built into a hillside and the side facing the road is mostly underground. The original three-seater outhouse is the only outbuilding still standing, it is directly behind the main structure.
