= Olive Pond Amies =

American educator, lecturer, and editor

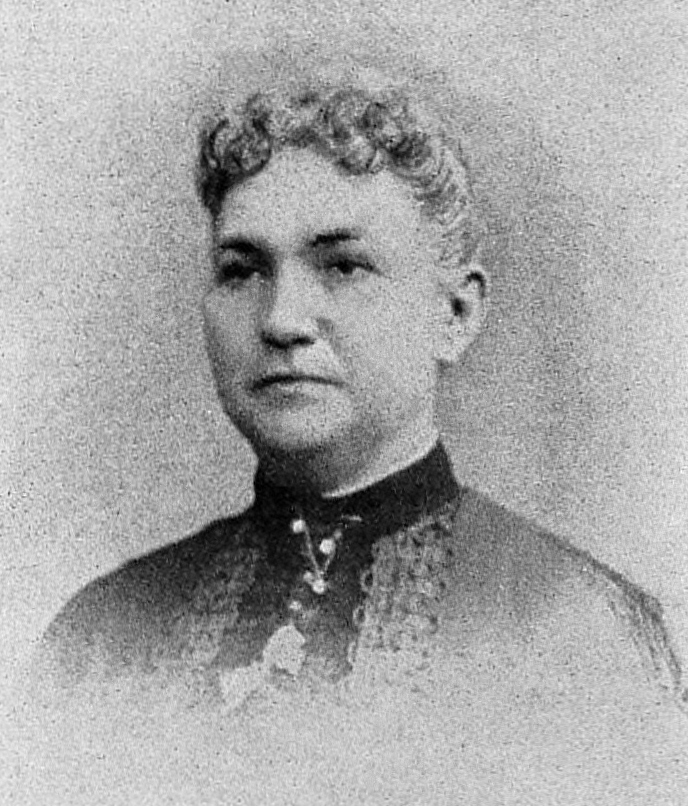
Olive Pond Amies

Olive Pond Amies (c. 1844–1917) was an American educator, lecturer, and editor from the U.S. state of New York. She founded the training school for teachers in Lewiston, Maine; served as editor of a Universalist Church publication; and was the first president of the Woman's Health Protective Association of the United States. Amies favored the temperance movement and women's suffrage.

== Biography ==
Olive Pond was born ca. 1844, in Jordan, New York. She was two weeks old when her father died, and the mother and child went to the home of the grandparents in New Britain, Connecticut. There the mother worked untiringly with her needle for the support of herself and her two children. The older child, a boy, was placed in the care of an uncle, and to Olive the mother took the place of father, mother, brother and sister. When Olive was four years old, she and her mother left the home of her grandmother and went to the village to board, so that Olive might be sent to school. Soon after this the mother married Cyrus Judd, a man of influence in New Britain. Olive continued in school for many years. She passed through the course of the New Britain high school, was graduated from the State Normal School (now Central Connecticut State University), and later, after several years of teaching, was graduated from the Normal and Training School (now State University of New York at Oswego) in Oswego, New York.

Amies was a leader in school and became eminent as a teacher. For many years, she gave model lessons at conventions and institutes. For five years, in the State of New York and two in the State of Maine, she was in demand in the county teachers' institutes. She founded the training school for teachers in Lewiston, Maine, and graduated its first classes. In 1877, she began to edit the primary department of The Sunday School Helper, published in Boston, the exponent for the Universalist Church. She held State positions in the Woman's Christian Temperance Union and the National Woman Suffrage Association, and delivered lectures on the different themes connected with those two organizations. She also spoke on kindergarten and object-teaching. Her "Conversations on Juvenile Reforms" were exceedingly popular wherever given. Amies served as president of the Women's Health Protective Association of the United States.

In 1871, she married the Rev. Joseph Hay Amies, pastor of the Universalist Church, Lewiston. They had a family of six children, three girls and three boys, of whom one son and one daughter died while young. Amies made her home in Philadelphia, Pennsylvania. She was brought up a Methodist but in later years, became an Episcopalian. Amies died at her home in Secane, Delaware County, Pennsylvania on March 3, 1917 from heart disease. She was buried in the West Laurel Hill Cemetery on March 8, 1917.
