= Skaneateles Creek =

- Jordan Aqueduct over Limestone Creek

- Location of the mouth within New York Skaneateles Creek (the United States)

Location
- Country: United States
- State: New York

Physical characteristics
- Source: Skaneateles Lake
  - location: Skaneateles
- Mouth: Seneca River
  - location: Northwest of Jordan
  - coordinates: 43°00′43″N 76°28′12″W
- Basin size: 101 sq mi (260 km^{2})

Basin features
- Progression: Skaneateles Creek → Seneca River → Oswego River → Lake Ontario → St. Lawrence River → Gulf of St. Lawrence → Atlantic Ocean
- Waterfalls: Skaneateles Falls

Skaneateles Creek is a river in New York, the United States. It drains Skaneateles Lake to the Seneca River. It flows through Skaneateles, Skaneateles Falls, Mottville, Elbridge, and Jordan before joining the Seneca River, about 2 miles northwest of Jordan, New York.

Though only approximately 10 miles long, Skaneateles Creek has 21 dams inventoried by the New York State Department of Environmental Conservation.

The Erie Canal crossed over Skaneateles Creek on the Jordan Aqueduct.
