= Jordan, New York =

Village in New York, United States

- Village
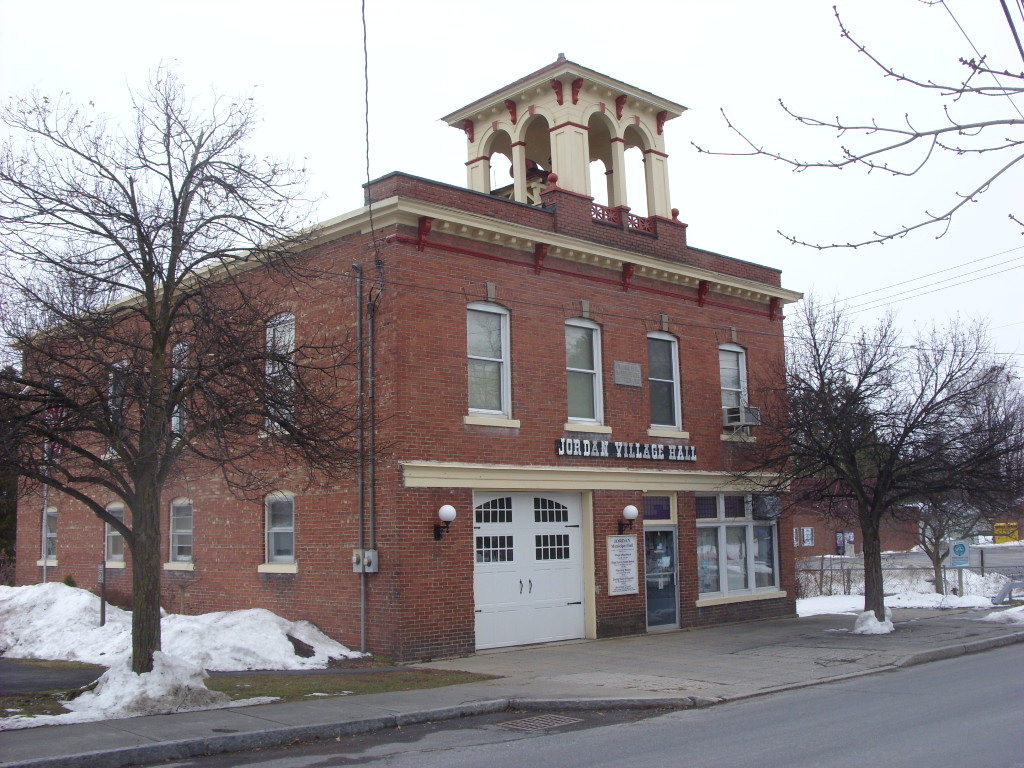
- Jordan Village Hall, December 2008

- Location in Onondaga County and the state of New York.
- Coordinates: 43°4′N 76°28′W
- Country: United States
- State: New York
- County: Onondaga
- Town: Elbridge

Area
  - Total: 1.17 sq mi (3.02 km^{2})
  - Land: 1.17 sq mi (3.02 km^{2})
  - Water: 0 sq mi (0.00 km^{2})
- Elevation: 413 ft (126 m)

Population (2020)
  - Total: 1,192
  - Density: 1,023.8/sq mi (395.31/km^{2})
- Time zone: UTC-5 (Eastern (EST))
  - Summer (DST): UTC-4 (EDT)
- ZIP code: 13080
- Area code: 315
- FIPS code: 36-38825
- GNIS feature ID: 0954196
- Website: jordanny.gov

Jordan is a village in Onondaga County, New York, United States. As of the 2020 census, the population was 1,192. It is part of the Syracuse metropolitan area. It was named after the Jordan River.

Jordan is located in the northwest part of the town of Elbridge, west of Syracuse.

== History ==
The village bloomed with the opening of the Erie Canal in 1825. Due to the canal, Jordan became larger than Elbridge Village farther south. In 1835, Jordan was incorporated as a village.

In 1983, much of the village was included in the Jordan Village Historic District and listed on the National Register of Historic Places.

== Erie Canal ==
When the Erie Canal opened in October 1825, the original route went through the middle of Jordan, along what is today Clinton and Mechanic streets, with the original lock being Lock 59 (located near the current post office).

When the Canal was expanded, straightened, and widened in the 1840s, the path of the Canal migrated to the north slightly. Lock 59 was removed, replaced by Lock 51 that was built about 1 mile west of the village. A four-arched aqueduct was built to allow the canal to cross over Skaneateles Creek.

The section of Canal that went through Jordan was closed in 1918 with the opening of the New York State Barge Canal that bypassed Jordan, using the natural waterway of the Seneca River north of the village.

Today, much of the expanded Canal's stonework is visible, with its path having been turned into a park in the middle of the village.

== Lincoln Funeral Procession and Cannonball ==
In 1865 as the Lincoln Funeral Train passed through the village, along the New York Central Railroad, a cannonball was fired in honor of the former president. The cannonball hit an old tree standing on the farmland of Issac Otis, which survived the hit

The tree was cut down in 1935 by two men, Jerome Teachout and O. J. Conger. As the two men were clearing away the trunk, they discovered that the tree had grown around the cannonball, fully engulfing it.

In 1997, teachers Kathy Philips and Kathy Jones led their 4th grade class in researching and fundraising for a historic marker.

== Historic places and businesses ==
The Jordan Lodge 386 F. & A.M., also known as the Masonic building, is located in Jordan on North Main Street. It was built in 1979. Bush Funeral Home, established in 1904, is also located on North Main Street.

The Jordan Historical Society, formed in the early 1950s, has two museums in the village. The main museum is located at 15 Mechanic Street. The mini museum, an original lock tenders house from the Enlarged Erie Canal, is located on North Chappell St.

== Image Gallery ==
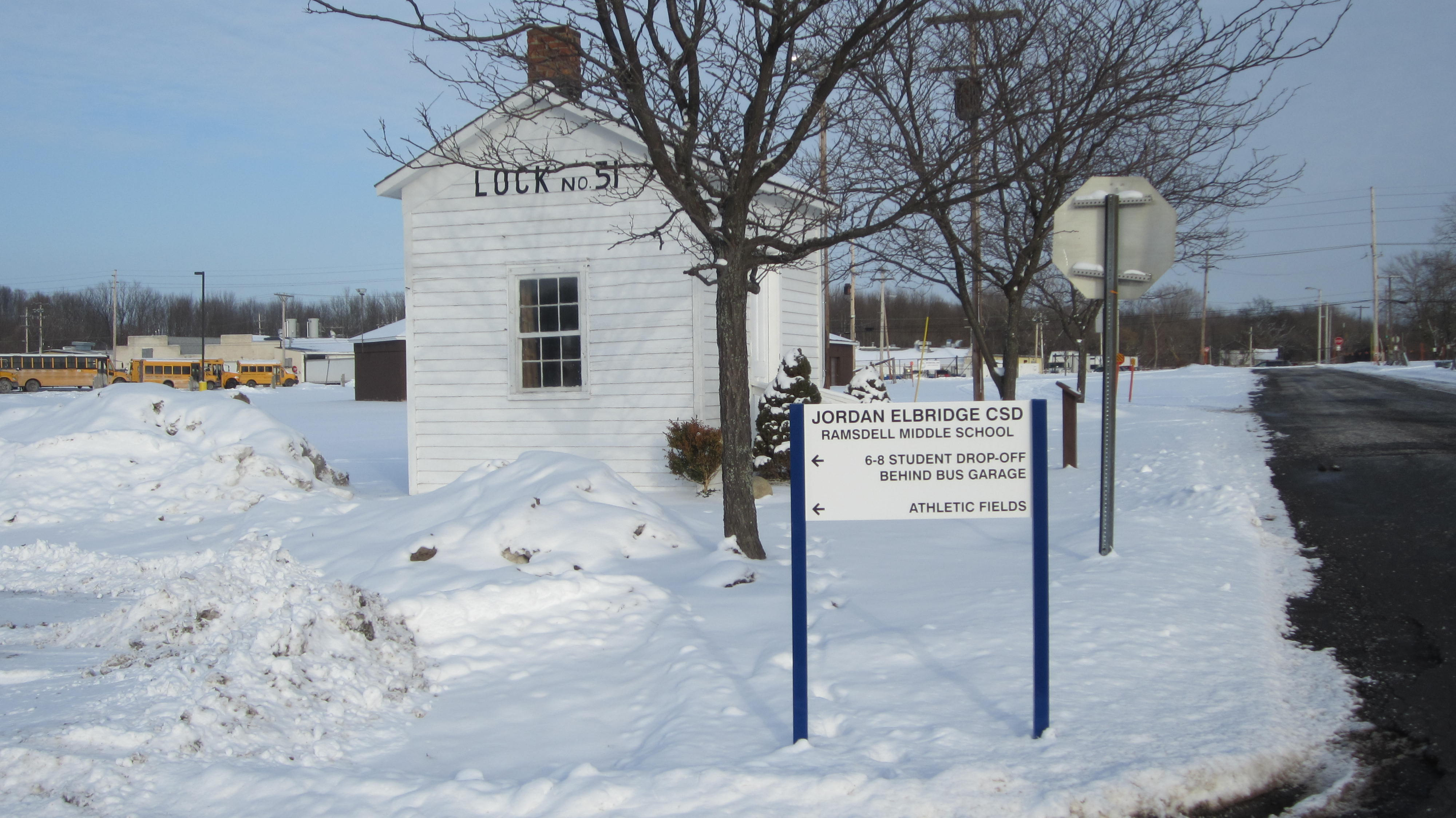
Erie Canal Lock 51 historical building

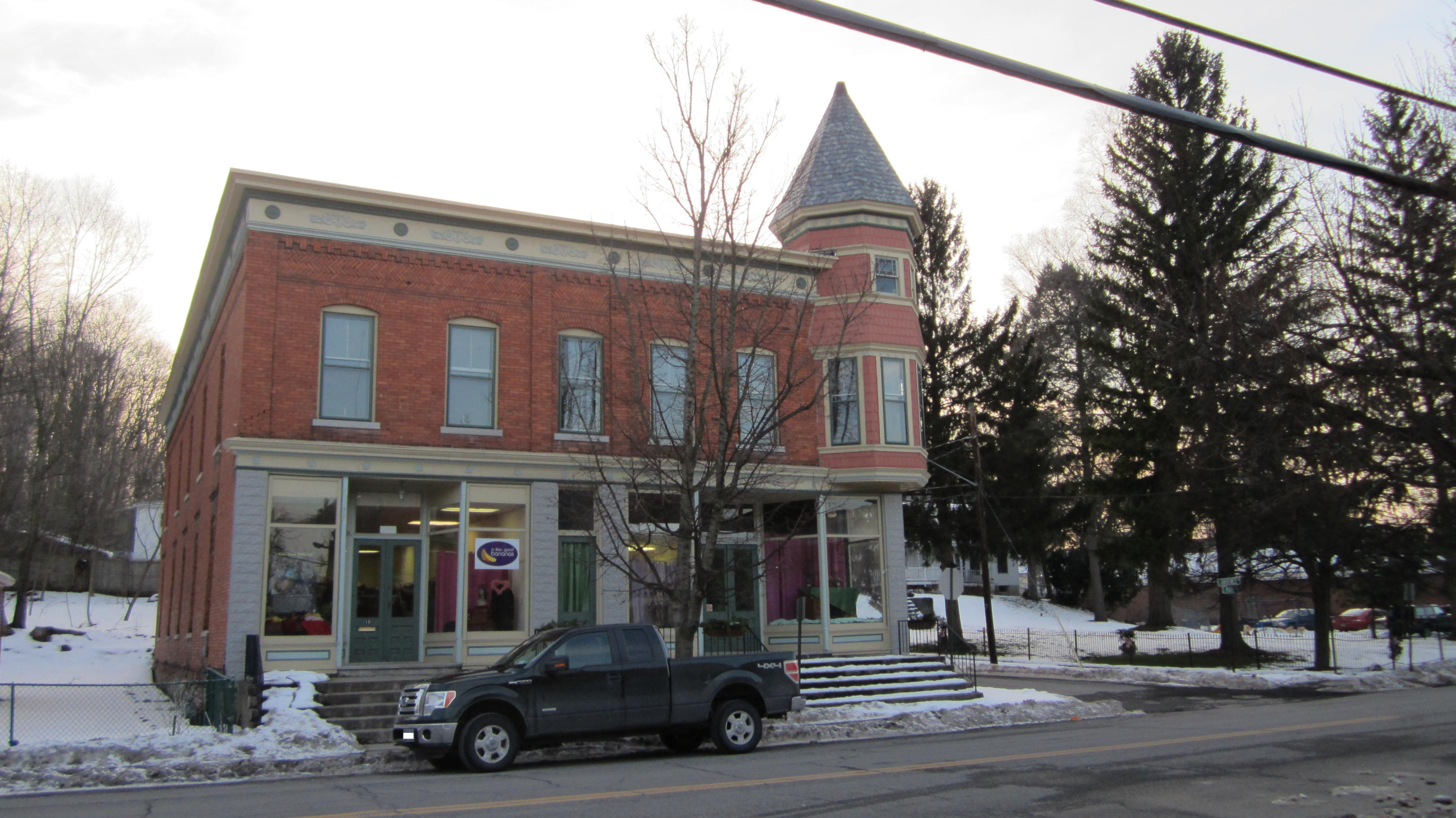
Hardware store built in 1898, converted into the Jordan Post Office in the 1970s

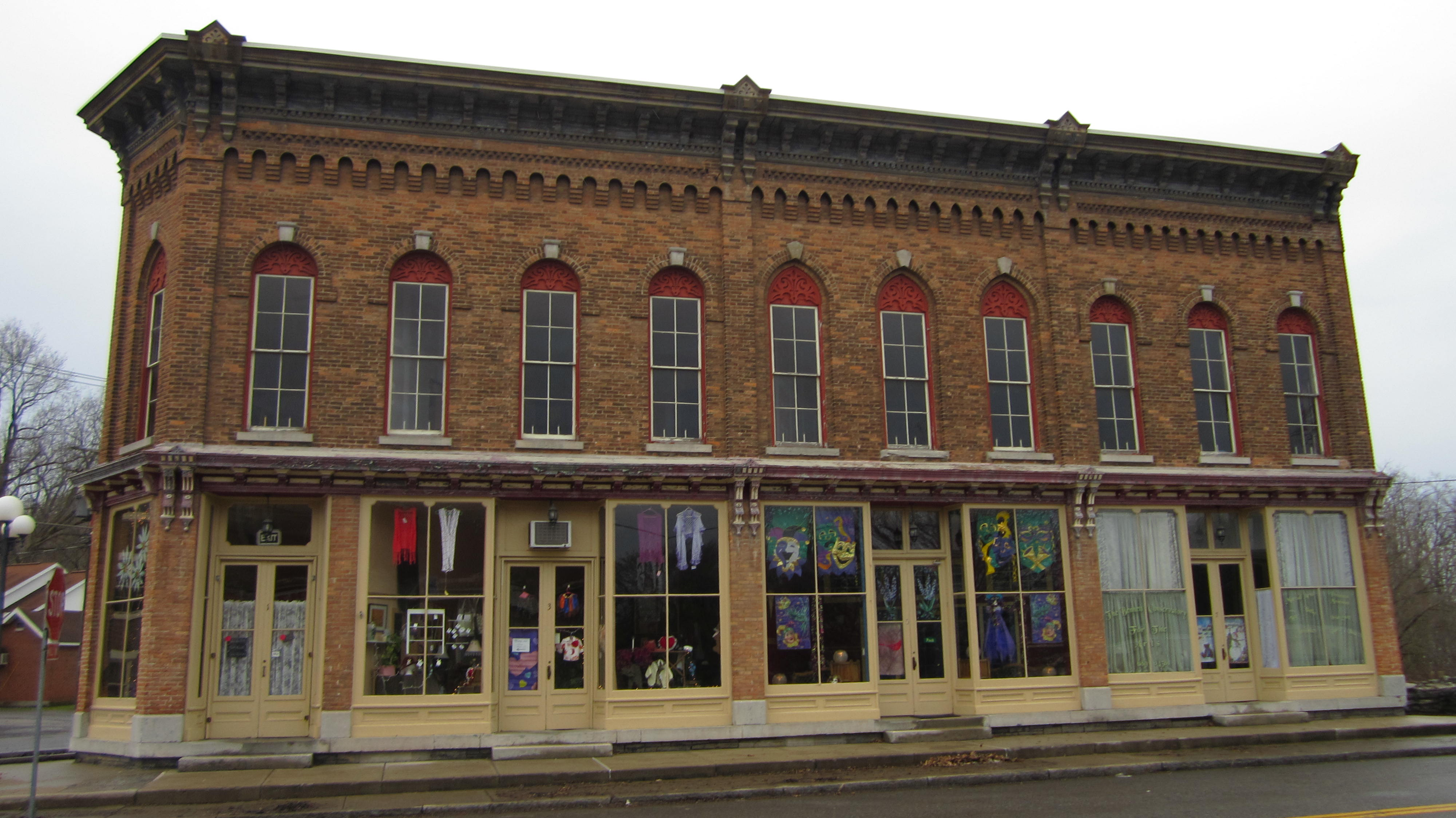
Teen Center & Ceramic Shop, with apartments on second floor

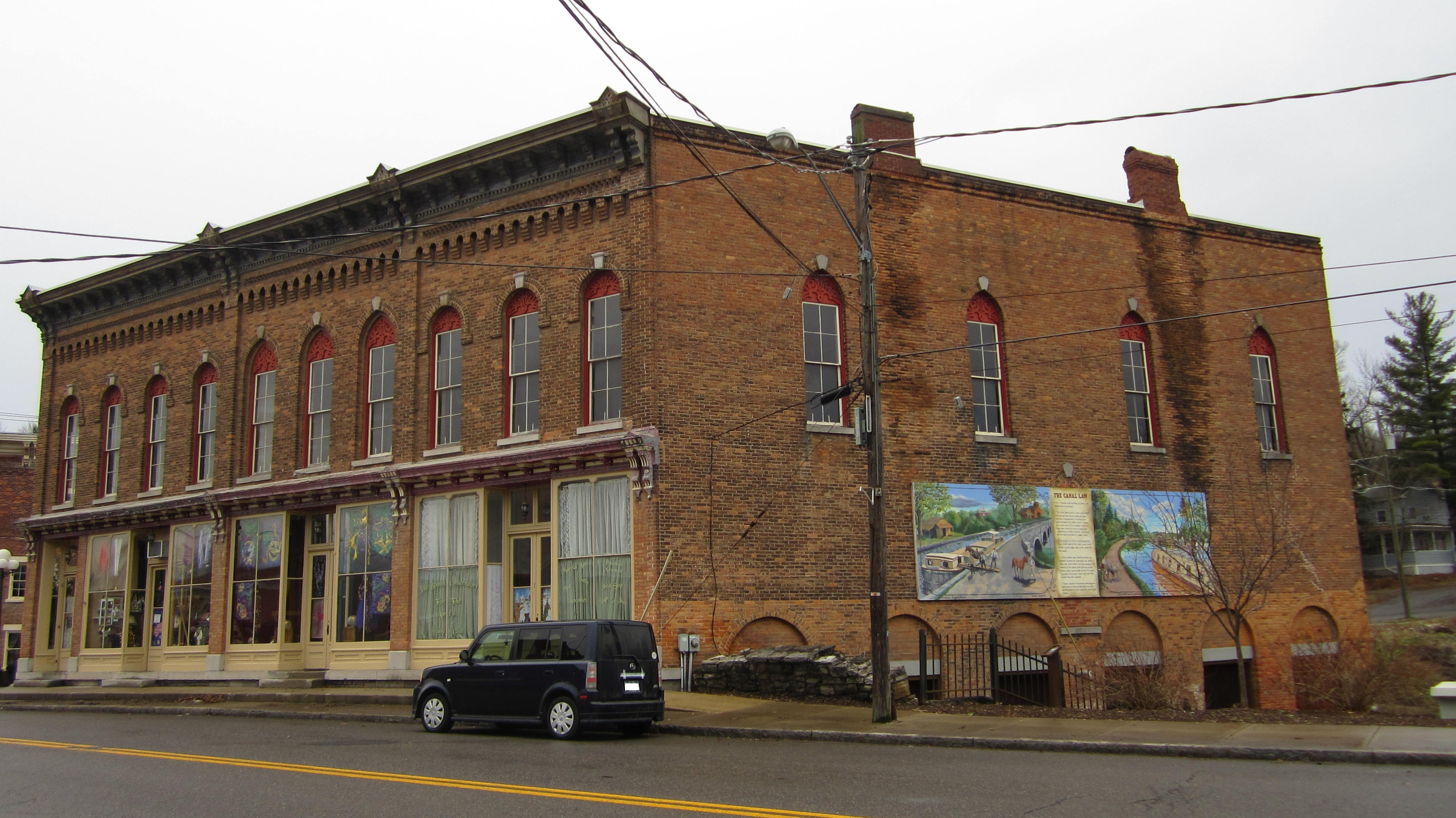
Front/side view of Teen Center

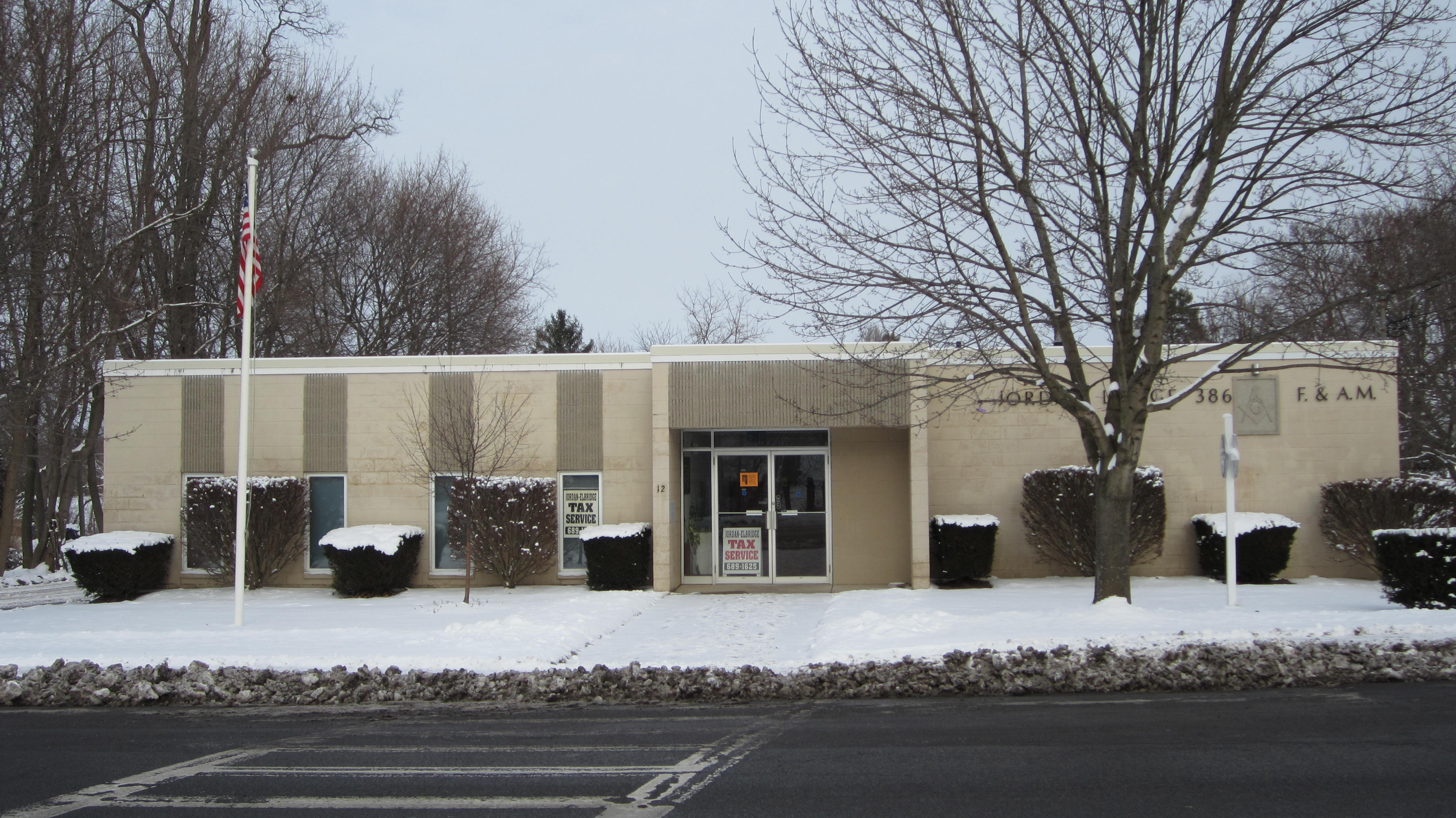
Jordan Lodge 386 F. & A.M.

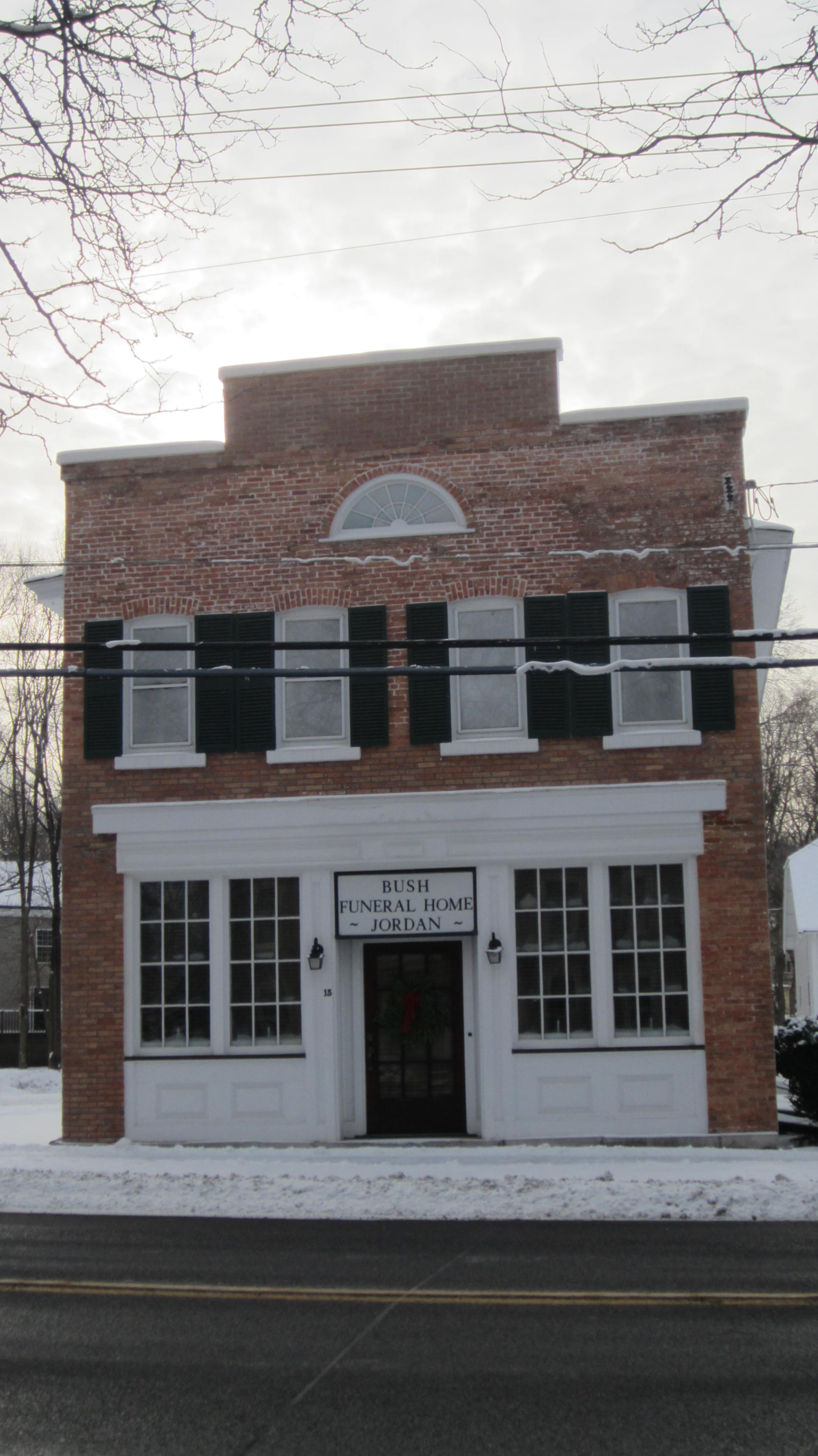
Bush Funeral Home

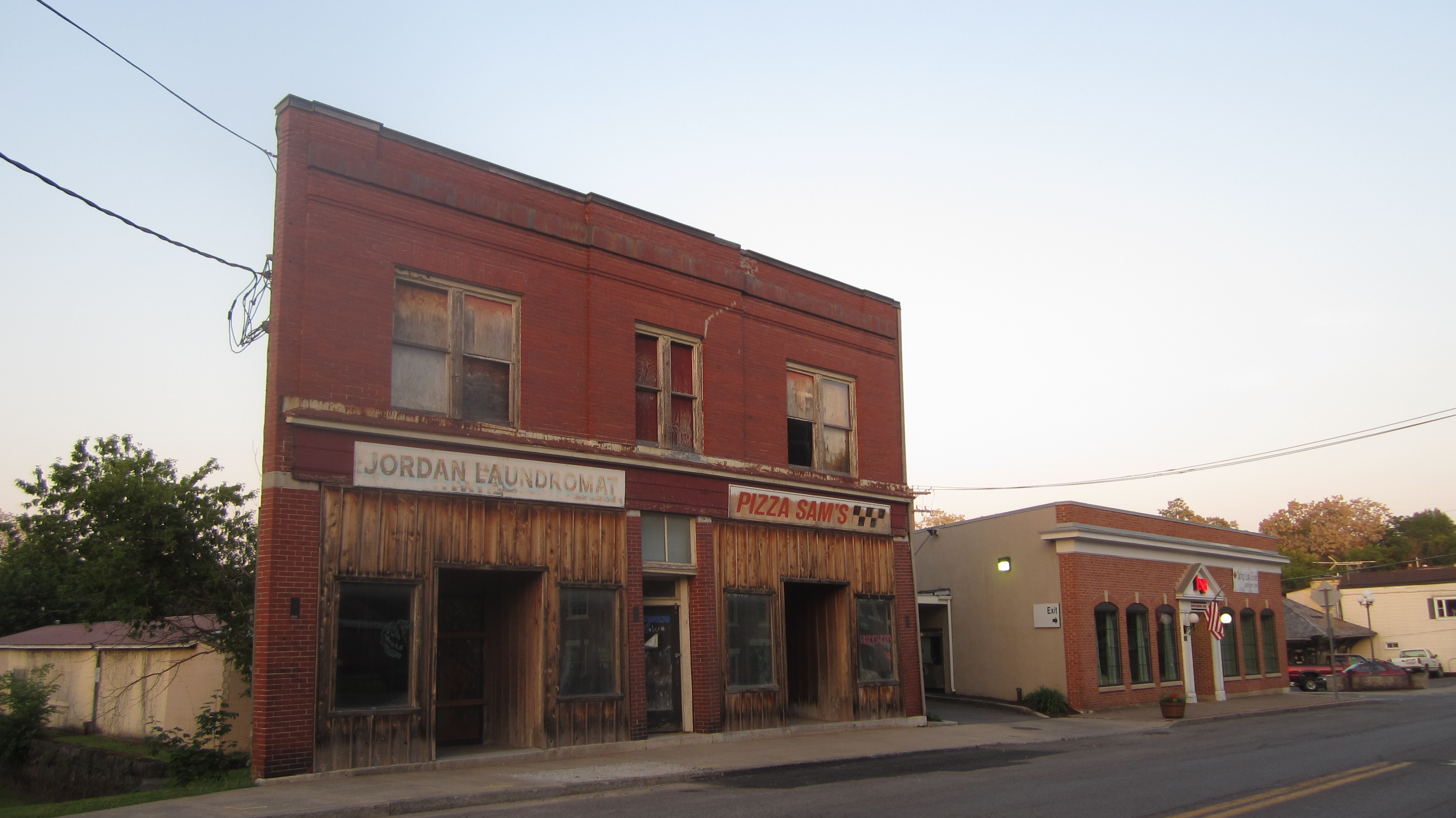
Old Jordan Laundry Mat, Old Pizza's Sam's, Jordan Bank LNB

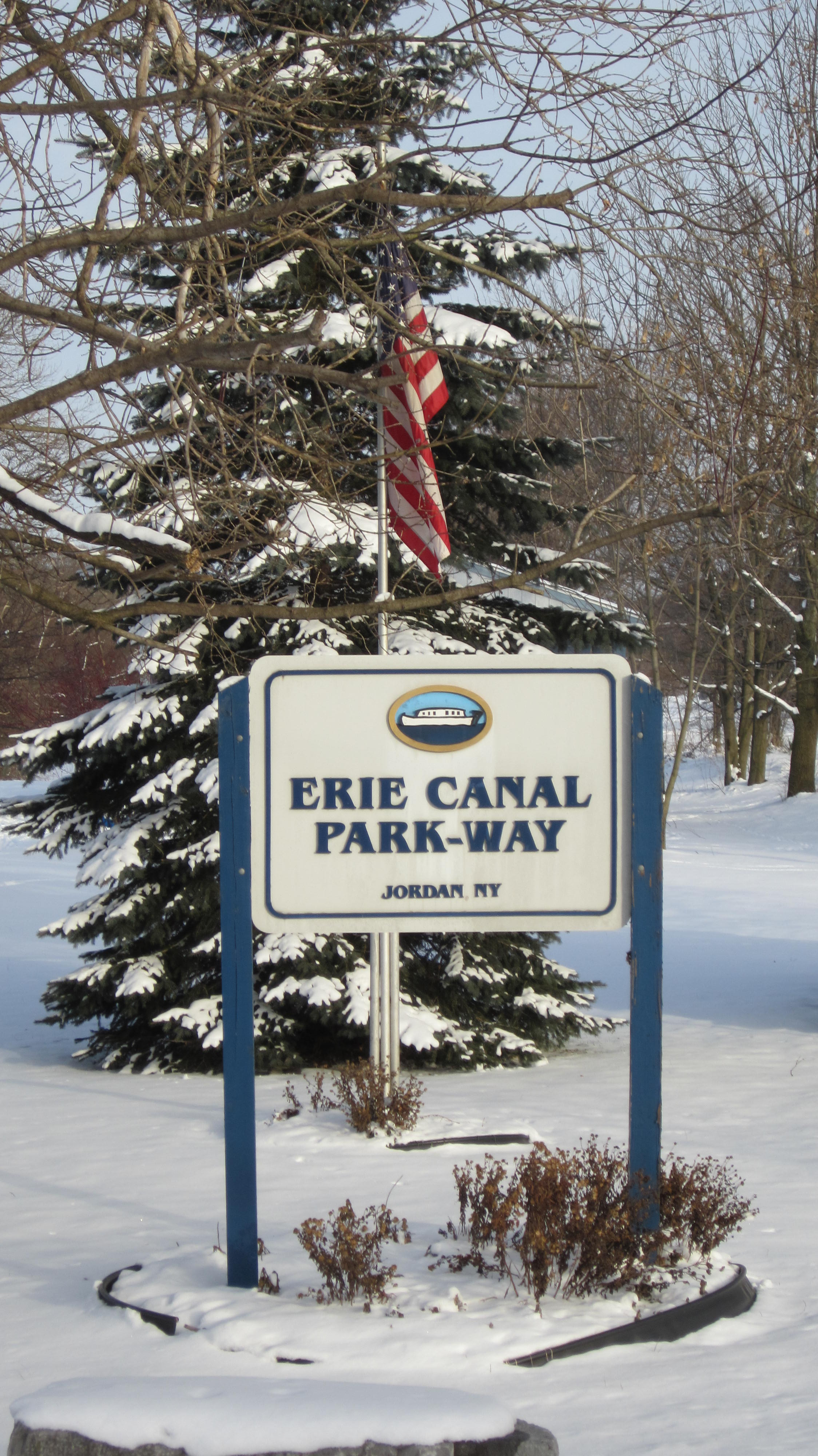
Erie Canal Park-Way

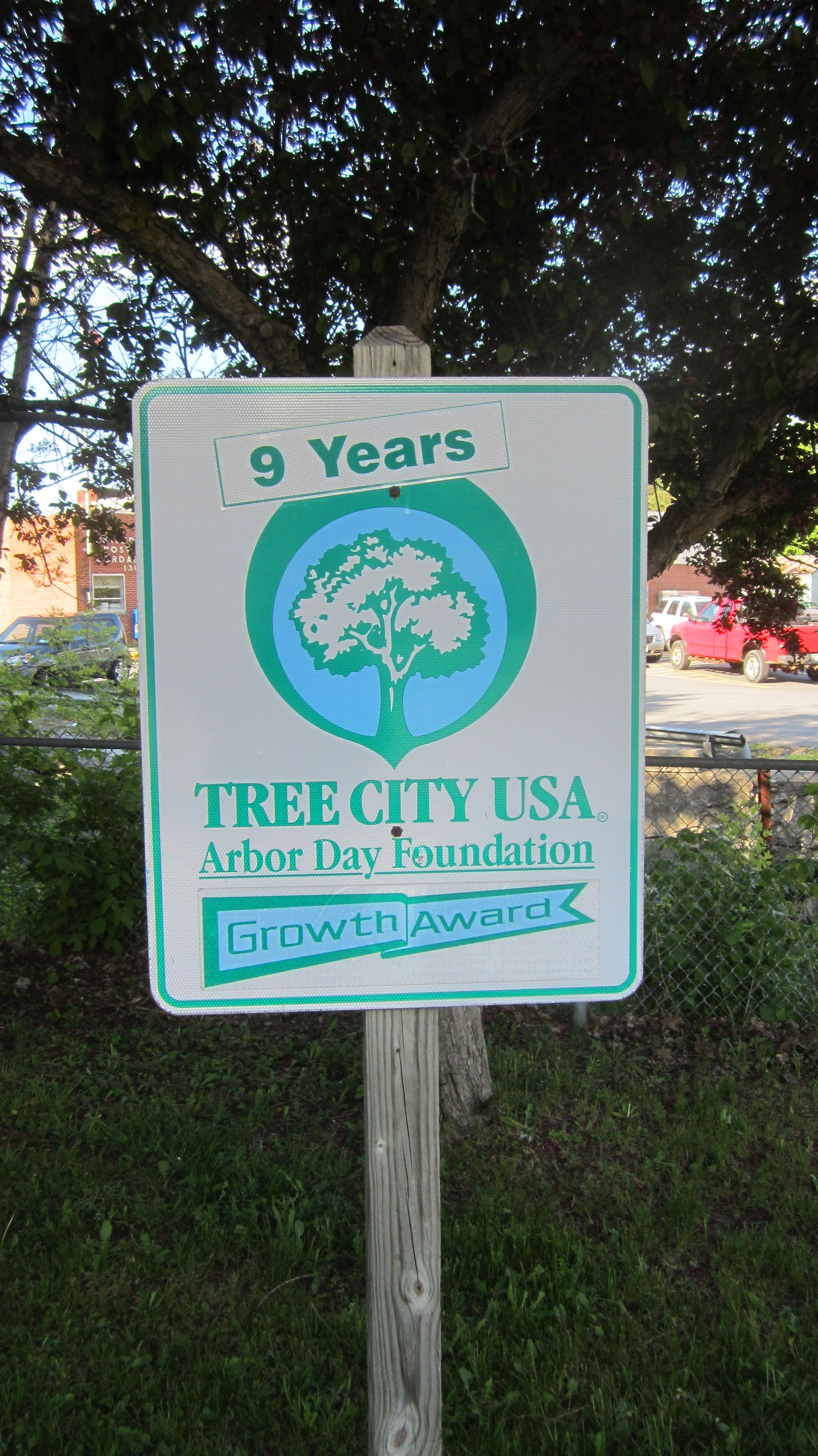
Tree City USA sign, Arborday Foundation

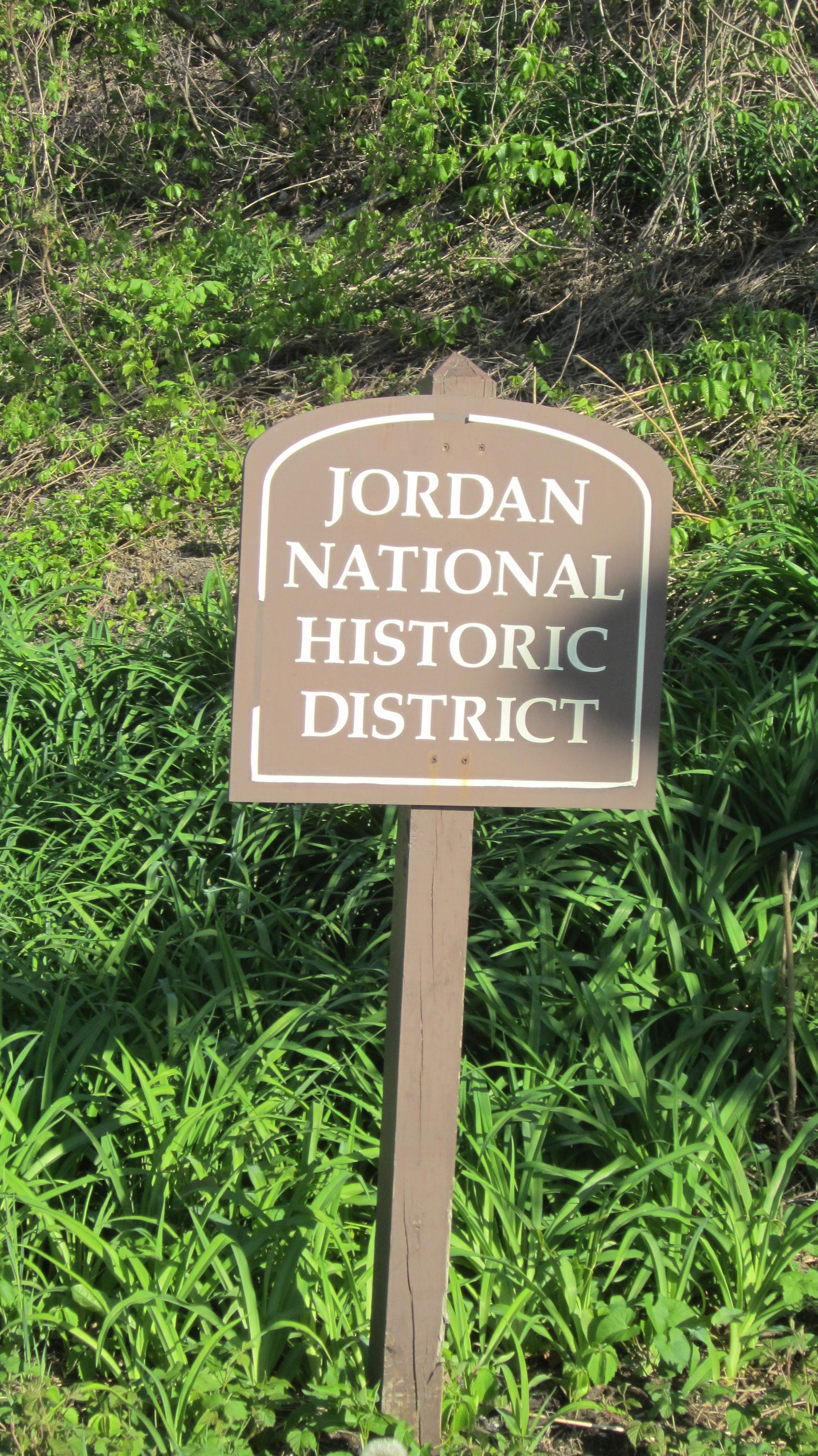
"Jordan National Historic District" sign, Clinton St.

== Geography ==
Jordan is located at 43°4′N 76°28′W (43.0658, -76.4729).

According to the United States Census Bureau, the village has a total area of 1.2 square miles (3.1 km^{2}), all land.

The village was formerly located on the Erie Canal, which has been re-routed farther north. The New York State Thruway (Interstate 90) passes north of the village, but there is no interchange at all in the town.

Skaneateles Creek flows through the village. The Jordan Aqueduct still stands where the Erie Canal crossed Skaneateles Creek.

Jordan is situated at the junction of state routes 31 and 317.

== Demographics ==
Historical population
Census	Pop.	Note	%±
1860	1,488		—
1870	1,263		−15.1%
1880	1,344		6.4%
1890	1,271		−5.4%
1900	1,118		−12.0%
1910	978		−12.5%
1920	1,012		3.5%
1930	1,145		13.1%
1940	1,115		−2.6%
1950	1,295		16.1%
1960	1,300		0.4%
1970	1,493		14.8%
1980	1,371		−8.2%
1990	1,325		−3.4%
2000	1,314		−0.8%
2010	1,368		4.1%
2020	1,192		−12.9%
U.S. Decennial Census

As of the census of 2000, there were 1,314 people, 499 households, and 336 families residing in the village. The population density was 1,136.7 inhabitants per square mile (438.9/km^{2}). There were 542 housing units at an average density of 468.9 per square mile (181.0/km^{2}). The racial makeup of the village was 97.34% White, 0.46% African American, 0.61% Native American, 0.53% Asian, 0.38% from other races, and 0.68% from two or more races. Hispanic or Latino of any race were 1.07% of the population.

There were 499 households, out of which 41.5% had children under the age of 18 living with them, 48.7% were married couples living together, 13.2% had a female householder with no husband present, and 32.5% were non-families. 28.5% of all households were made up of individuals, and 15.8% had someone living alone who was 65 years of age or older. The average household size was 2.63 and the average family size was 3.25.

In the village, the population was spread out, with 32.0% under the age of 18, 6.7% from 18 to 24, 28.5% from 25 to 44, 19.4% from 45 to 64, and 13.5% who were 65 years of age or older. The median age was 35 years. For every 100 females, there were 96.1 males. For every 100 females age 18 and over, there were 89.0 males.

The median income for a household in the village was $34,728, and the median income for a family was $40,234. Males had a median income of $32,583 versus $26,250 for females. The per capita income for the village was $15,844. About 6.3% of families and 8.5% of the population were below the poverty line, including 9.4% of those under age 18 and 13.0% of those age 65 or over.

== Education ==
The village is in the Jordan-Elbridge Central School District.

== Notable people ==
- Olive Pond Amies, educator
- Sheldon Peck, Folk Artist and Abolitionist
