= Ten Mile Point, New York =

Coordinates: 42.825°N 76.313°W

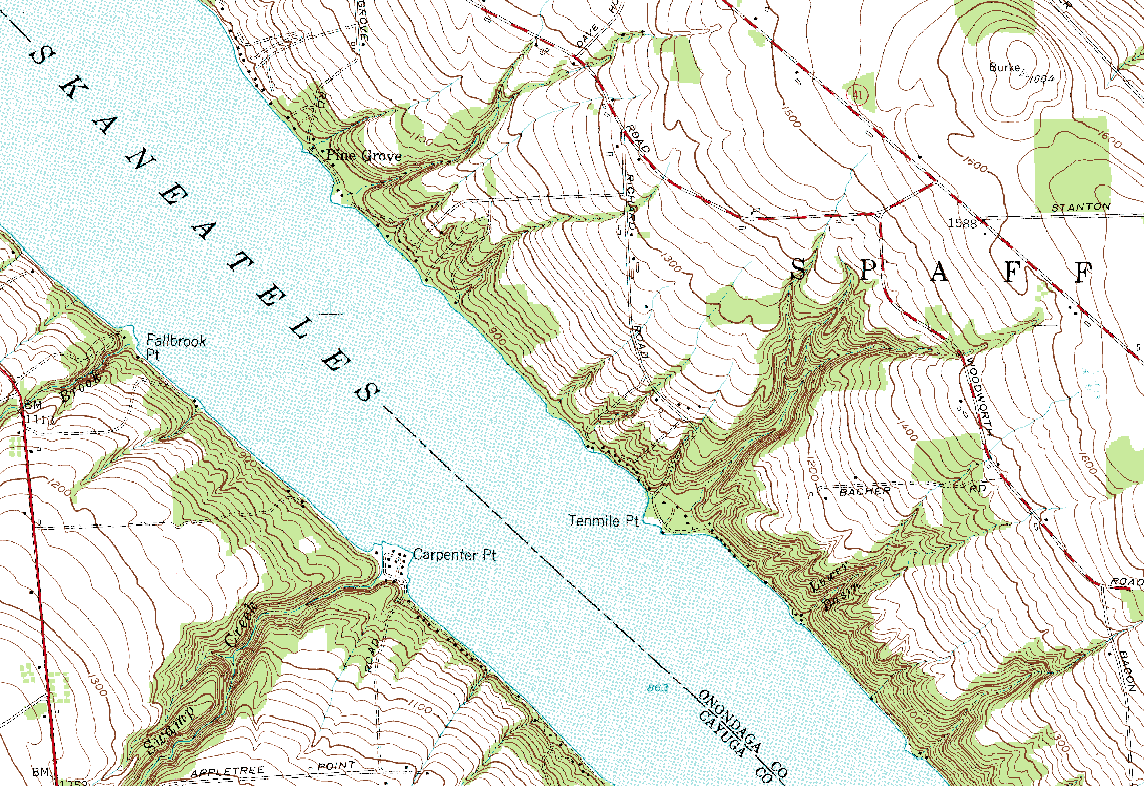
U.S.G.S. map of Tenmile Point

Ten Mile Point (Tenmile Point) is a scenic area on the shore of Skaneateles Lake, New York, a popular picnic spot for lake outings in the late 19th and early 20th centuries. It is located at the mouth of a ravine on alluvium. Onondaga County Road 72 runs through it and is locally known as "10 Mile Point Road". It was formerly the property of the Skaneateles Railroad and Steamboat Company (Skaneateles Park Company) who built a steamboat dock, a dancing pavilion and planted a grove of trees there. Their planned hotel was never built. And in 1906 Ten Mile Point was purchased by the Auburn and Syracuse Electric Railroad Company from the Skaneateles Park Company. It is now the location of Lourdes Camp, an historic facility of the local Roman Catholic diocese. In 1990 the "Six Town Picnic'" that had been held annually from 1885 until World War II was revived at Ten Mile Point.

== Lourdes Camp ==
In 1942, the fifty acre F. Harris Nichols family estate at Ten Mile Point was given to the Catholic Charities of the Roman Catholic Diocese of Syracuse for a camp for children. The new camp was named Lourdes Camp and opened the same year. It replaced "Morning Star Manor" the Catholic camp for children at Little York on Tully Lake. Later an additional fifty acres was added to the camp. Currently it has 100 acres (40 ha) of land and 1,500 feet (460 m) of water front, with nineteen cabins, an infirmary, chapel, dining hall, boat house, main lodge, and working bathrooms. At one time it had separate camping periods for boys and girls during the summer, but more recently it has been coeducational. In the summer of 2018, Lourdes Camp will be celebrating their 75th anniversary. The boat house has recently been rebuilt and the bathrooms renovated along with the building of an additional bathroom house.

As of 2018, Lourdes Camp offers seven weeks of sleep away camp for boys and girls ages 7–14. Also, day camp is offered to boys and girls ages 7–11 for the same seven weeks. Campers who sleep overnight may stay for one week at a time with the weeks ending on either a Friday afternoon or a Saturday morning. Drop off for sleep away campers is Sunday morning. Campers can enjoy several activities such as swimming, canoeing, sailing, volleyball, archery, basketball, and several others. There is also a ropes course which older campers can enjoy that consists of a lower ropes course and high ropes course.
