= Women's Health Protective Association =

US women's organization for public health

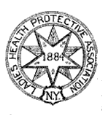
Ladies Health Protective Association of New York insignia, designed by Helen M. Winslow

Women's Health Protective Association (sometimes, Woman's Health Protective Association; original parent body, Ladies' Health Protective Association) was a US women's organization focused on improving a city's public health and protecting the immediate neighborhood. It was founded in New York City in November 1884 as the Ladies' Health Protective Association.

The impetus for the association occurred when a few women were annoyed by a nuisance maintained in the immediate neighborhood of their homes. They assembled in the parlor of one of the women to talk over the situation and devise some plan of concerted effort that could be brought to bear upon the New York City Metropolitan Board of Health to induce it to abate this nuisance. The result led to the formation of "The Ladies' Health Protective Association." It commanded public attention because its work was public and for the public. The meetings became important enough to have reporters assigned from the daily papers attend them, and reports appeared.

Associations were formed in other cities on the same general principles. The newer associations substituted the word "woman," or "women," for " ladies," although the original charter granted by New York State was to "The Ladies' Health Protective Association." By 1895, the parent body decided, in view of the prejudices against the use of the word "lady", to change its name to The Woman's Health Protective Association.

== Manhattan, New York ==
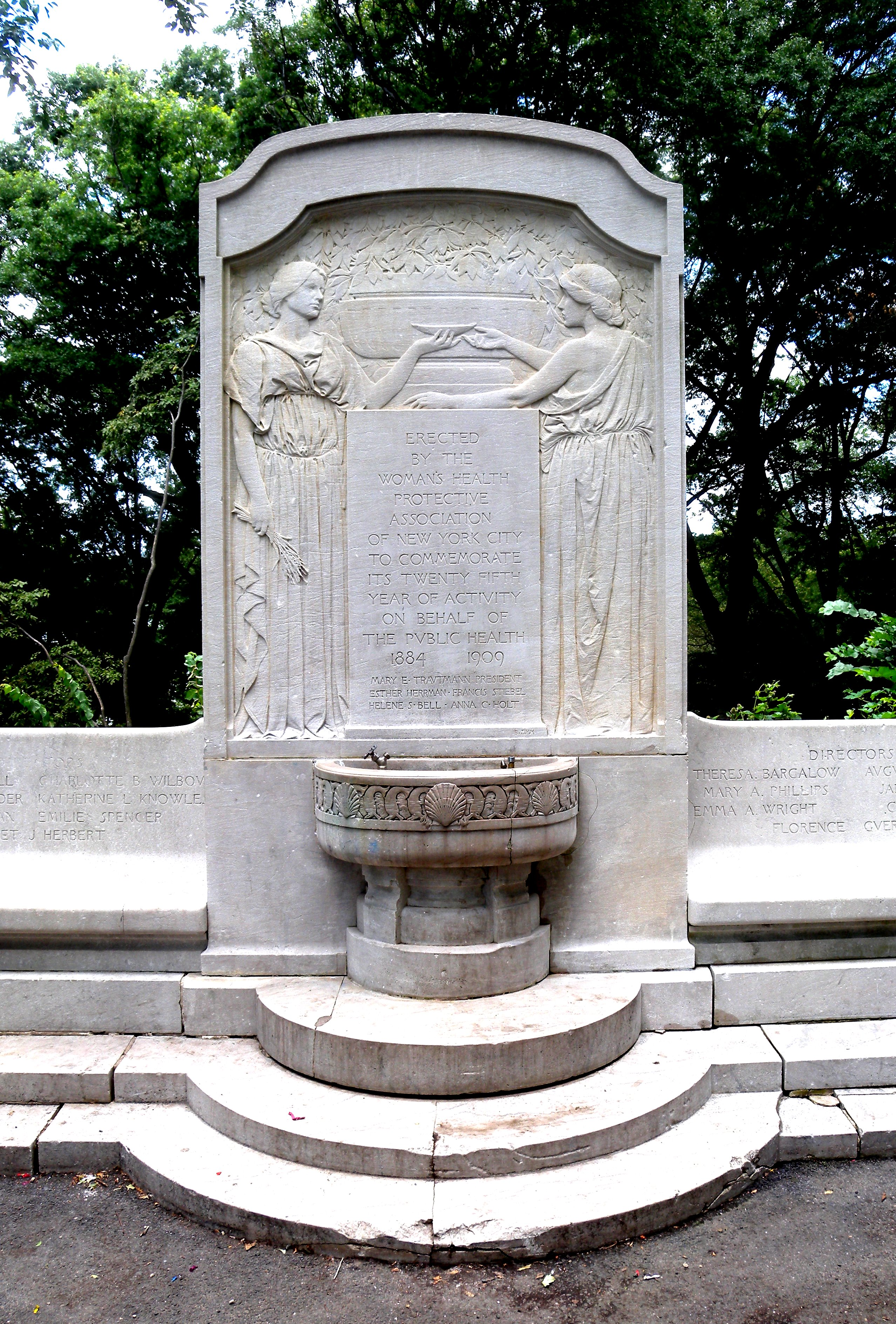
Women's Health Protective Association fountain, Riverside Park

In November, 1884, eleven women residing on Beekman Hill, whose houses were located on a high bluff overlooking the East River, were so outraged at the continuance of the foul odors which polluted the atmosphere of the entire neighborhood, causing them to keep windows closed in the hottest weather, and depriving them of their right to pure air, that they resolved to investigate the cause of this nuisance. Accordingly, they made a tour of the neighborhood, in that section of the city known as the abattoir district, which extends on First Avenue from 43rd Street to 47th Street. Their first visit was a revelation, and while they returned to their homes ill from the inspection and the discovery of the nuisance, they decided that some action must be taken to better the conditions. The following morning their number was increased to fifteen, and it was resolved that these women should form themselves into an organization, to be known as the Ladies' Health Protective Association.

They found that relief would require more than protests, and probably a struggle of some months, at least, with official greed and public indifference. For efficiency, they formed an association afterwards christened "The Ladies Health Protective Association of New York". Only after ten years of persistent effort was their original purpose accomplished. In the meantime, however, they accomplished other things no less important. They demonstrated woman's power and fitness to cope with these questions. They formed committees to investigate the water supply, gas houses, school hygiene, street cleaning, garbage disposal, sewer system, sanitation of prisons and tenements, and in several instances influenced the legislature to pass sanitary laws. The group's first convention occurred May 14–15, 1896 at the New York Academy of Medicine.

A marble stele and drinking fountain, designed by Bruno Louis Zimm were placed at Riverside Drive and 116th Street in 1909 to commemorate the 25th anniversary of the organization.

== Brooklyn, New York ==
The constitution of the Brooklyn association read in part: "the objects of this Association shall be to inspire the women of Brooklyn with a realization of their municipal obligations; to promote the health of the people of Brooklyn and the cleanliness of the city by taking such action, from time to time, as may secure the enforcement of existing sanitary laws and regulations by calling the attention of the proper authorities to any violation thereof, and to procure the amendment of such laws and regulations when they shall be found insufficient for the prevention of acts injurious to the public health or the cleanliness of the city."

The Brooklyn association was organized in March, 1890, and incorporated April 2, 1890, with a voluntary secretary. Annual dues of US$1 supported the society. There 25 members of the board of directors, with an executive committee of seven, meeting once a month. The departments of work were: municipal, legal, lecture, press, and house. The Association had no organ of its own, but came in touch with its workers, who could attend the monthly meetings of the board of directors. The society was non-partisan and had neighborhood or branch associations in election districts.

Some of its accomplishments were: cleaner streets, because of boxes for waste placed on the street-corners; cleaner cars, due to placards prohibiting spitting on the floor; increased interest in the cleanliness and health of the city on the part of the women; and the initial movement resulting in the overthrow of the ring rule in 1893. In 1893, they played an important role in the election of Hon. Charles A. Schieren for mayor.

The Association originated in the thought of its president, who desired to see Brooklyn made a cleaner and more attractive city, through a more patriotic interest on the part of the women. A meeting was called to consider to what extent women are responsible for the condition of the streets, and that conference led to the organization of the Women's Health Protective Association of Brooklyn, somewhat on the lines of the older Association of the same name in New York. It grew steadily in four years, numbering 450 paying members, while a much larger number were actively engaged in extending its influence and carrying out its principles. In 1896, there were 1,000 members with five local branches.

== Philadelphia, Pennsylvania ==
In Philadelphia's first annual report, it stated in part: "The men make the laws, award contracts and pay the bills; the execution of the contract lies with the contractor; the supervision of the work with the women. When we consider that every life saved to our city means just so much added to the world's working force; when we think of the amount of misery caused in each home by every case of sickness; the enormous amount of capital invested in huge institutions to take care of people after they are sick, and when we know that if the principles for which each committee stands are carried out, a far greater result will be obtained in preventing misery and wretchedness, by preventing sickness than can possibly result from an attempt to heal after the misery has come, we faintly realize the magnitude and importance of the work we have attempted."

The Woman's Health Protective Association of Philadelphia organized in 1893 as a committee of the New Century Club. This association seems to have established its work on a broader and more comprehensive basis and extended its influence along longer lines than others.

The first committee to get to work was that on contagious diseases, whose activities included the endorsement of a bill in the state legislature providing for inspection of all cattle farms in the state, with reference to their sanitary condition and the prevention of tuberculosis; also, the establishment of a pay hospital for contagious diseases. The street cleaning and garbage committee personally visited the slum districts every week. Other committees included water supply and a sweating system. A trolley committee urged the importance to public health of running more cars, to avoid overcrowding, of vestibules for protection of motormen, the adopting of fenders, longer straps to accommodate women and children, and conspicuous signs forbidding expectoration. A literature committee studied the literature of the day for all matters pertaining to sanitary subjects.

== National organization ==
A national convention was held in Philadelphia May 3, 1897, with delegates from forty clubs and societies, the majority representing health protective or village improvement associations. The Woman's Health Protective Association of the United States was formed, with Olive Pond Amies as president.
