= Skaneateles, New York =

Town in New York, United States

Skaneateles Sganya·daís (Onondaga)
- Town
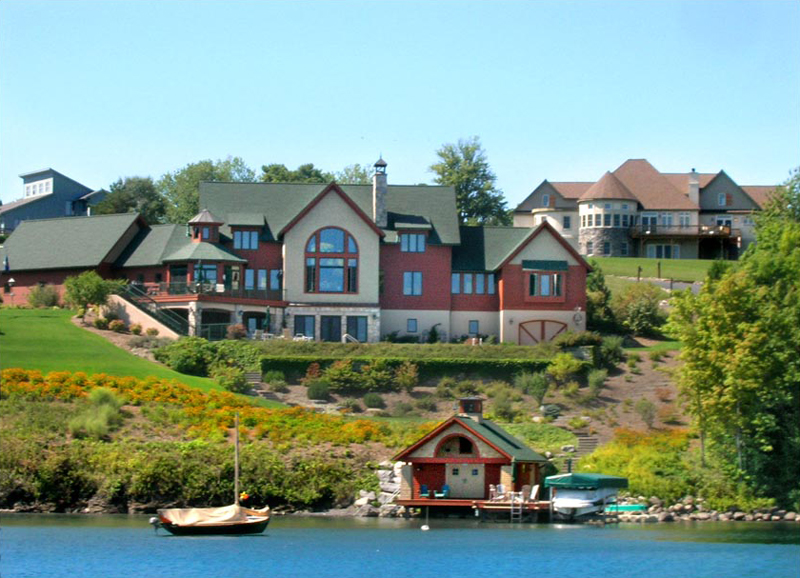
- A home on the west shore of Skaneateles Lake

- Seal
- Nicknames: Skantown, Skan
- Location in Onondaga County and the state of New York.

- Location within the United States
- Coordinates: 42°56′48″N 76°25′42″W
- Country: United States
- State: New York
- County: Onondaga

Government
  - Type: Town Council
  - Town Supervisor: Janet Aaron (R)
  - Town Council: Members: • Chris Legg (D); • Courtney Alexander (R); • Mark Tucker (R); • Sue Dove (R)

Area
  - Total: 48.83 sq mi (126.46 km^{2})
  - Land: 42.61 sq mi (110.35 km^{2})
  - Water: 6.22 sq mi (16.11 km^{2})

Population (2020)
  - Total: 7,112
  - Density: 166.9/sq mi (64.45/km^{2})
- Time zone: UTC-5 (EST)
  - Summer (DST): UTC-4 (EDT)
- Postal code: 13152
- Area code: 315
- FIPS code: 36-067-67521
- Website: townofskaneateles.gov

Skaneateles (/ˌskæniˈætləs/ SKAN-ee-AT-ləs, locally /ˌskɪn-/ SKIN-) is a town in Onondaga County, New York, United States. As of the 2020 Census, the population was 7,112. The name is from the Onondaga language term Sganya·daís for the adjacent Skaneateles Lake, which means 'long lake'. The town is on the western border of the county and includes a village, also named Skaneateles. Both the town and village are southwest of Syracuse.

The town – including the four hamlets of Mottville, Skaneateles Falls, Mandana and Shepard Settlement – are governed by the Town of Skaneateles Board. For many years, the Town Board would take their recurring monthly meetings "on the road" to the surrounding hamlets. On the 23rd of June 2014, the hamlet meeting for Mandana was held in the Mandana Barn.

== History ==
The area was part of the former Central New York Military Tract. On February 26, 1830, the town of Skaneateles was formed from the town of Marcellus, and the town later annexed areas of the Town of Spafford in 1840. Early turnpikes facilitated development. The town was noted for participation in reform movements before the Civil War.

In 1843, the Skaneateles Community acquired and successfully operated a large farm and developed small industries. It ultimately failed because of internal difficulties, as well as external concern about its unorthodox social practices. Locals sometimes referred to it as "No God", because of the atheistic views of members. The Skaneateles Community published a newspaper, the "Comunitist" [sic] between 1844 and 1846 when the community dissolved. Buildings are extant, known as "Community Place", now serving as a bed-and-breakfast.

Some Skaneateles men volunteered for the ill-fated Upper Canada Rebellion (1837) to liberate Canada and were imprisoned by the British in Australia. Quaker congregations were involved in abolitionist activity. Underground Railroad sites have been documented in Skaneateles. Although the larger city of Syracuse nearby was known nationally as a center of abolition and Underground Railroad activity, Skaneateles was said (by Beauchamp, an early historian) to have "eclipsed Syracuse as an anti-slavery town".

On July 4, 1876, resident John Dodgson Barrow delivered the centennial address in Skaneateles recounting the history of the village up to that time. In 1891, he had it printed in Syracuse as a 20-page book.

The Brook Farm, Community Place, and Kelsey-Davey Farm are listed on the National Register of Historic Places.

== Geography ==
According to the United States Census Bureau, the town has a total area of 48.8 square miles (126 km^{2}), of which 42.7 square miles (87.49%) is land and 6.1 square miles (12.51%) is water.

== Demographics ==
Historical population
Census	Pop.	Note	%±
1830	3,812		—
1840	3,981		4.4%
1850	4,081		2.5%
1860	4,335		6.2%
1870	4,524		4.4%
1880	4,866		7.6%
1890	4,662		−4.2%
1900	4,205		−9.8%
1910	4,274		1.6%
1920	4,247		−0.6%
1930	4,795		12.9%
1940	4,639		−3.3%
1950	5,193		11.9%
1960	6,603		27.2%
1970	7,825		18.5%
1980	7,795		−0.4%
1990	7,526		−3.5%
2000	7,323		−2.7%
2010	7,209		−1.6%
2020	7,112		−1.3%
2021 (est.)	7,155	▲	0.6%
U.S. Decennial Census

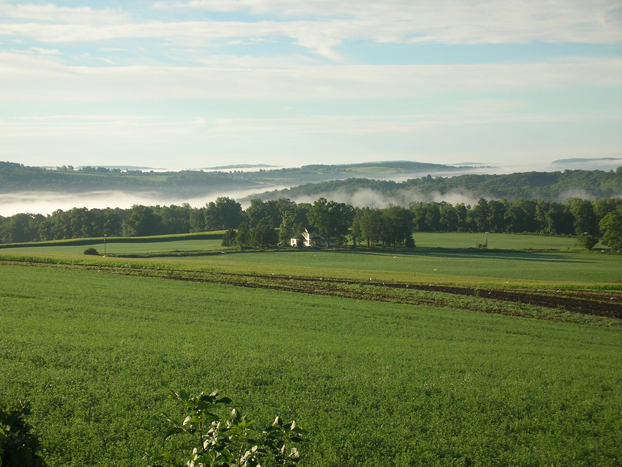
Farms and rolling hills surround Skaneateles Lake.

As of the 2020 United States census, there are 7,112 people and 1,998 families residing in the town. The population density is 166.91 people per square mile (64.44 people/km^{2}). There are 3,233 housing units at an average density of 75.8 units per square mile (29.3 units/km^{2}). The racial makeup of the town is 93.56% White, 0.15% Black or African-American, 0.25% Native American and Alaska Native, 0.96% Asian, 0.62% from other races, and 4.46% from two or more races. Hispanic or Latino people of any race also make up 2.31% of the population.

It was estimated in 2021 that there are 3,047 households in Skaneateles, with which 20.2% have children under the age of 18 living with them, 49.1% are married couples living together, 30.8% are non-families, and 25.9% are made up of individuals. The average household size is 2.33 and the average family size is 2.87.

In 2021, it was also estimated that 21.1% of people in Skaneateles are under the age of 18, 3.5% from 18 to 24, 26.8% from 25 to 44, 25.8% from 45 to 64, and 29.7% who are 65 years of age or older. The median age is 51.1 years old.

As of 2021, the median household income is estimated to be $90,762, and the median family income is estimated to be $120,667. It is also estimated that 5.1% of the population and 1.9% of families are below the poverty line.

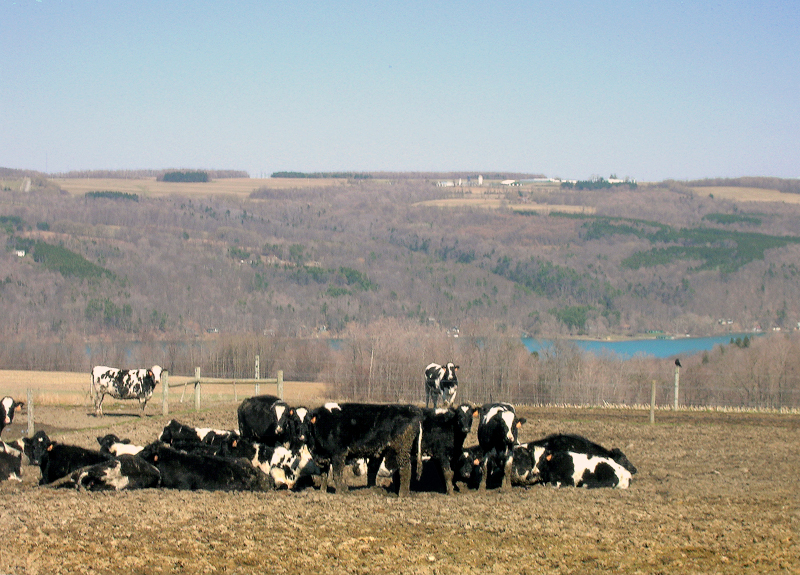
High pasture on the west side of the lake

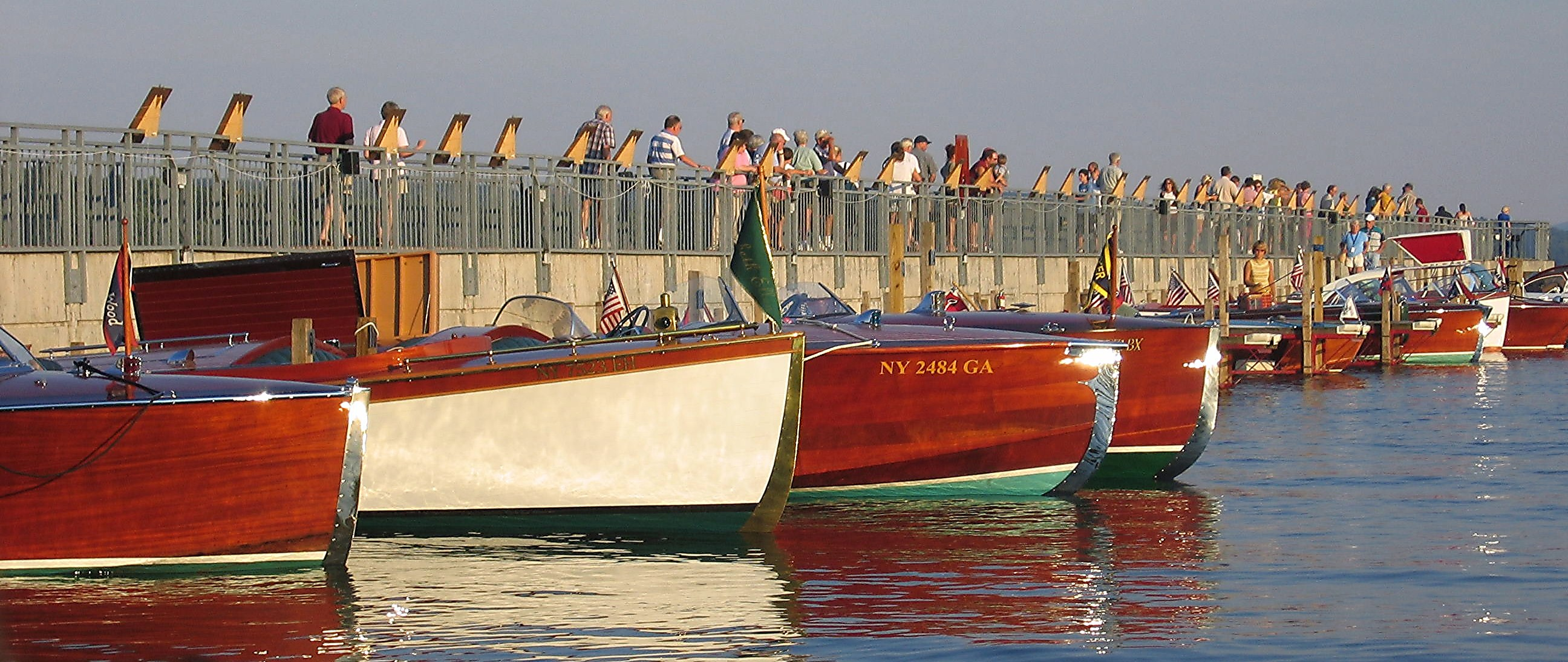
Residents and visitors stroll along Skaneateles' pier, just off Clift Park in the village of Skaneateles, for the best view of antique boats during Skaneateles' annual Antique and Classic Boat Show.

== Communities and locations ==
- Highland Way – A neighborhood just east of Skaneateles village on Onondaga Rd.
- Jones Beach – A hamlet on the east shore of Skaneateles Lake on NY-41.
- Long Bridge – A hamlet at the north town line, north of Mottville.
- Mandana – A hamlet down the west side of the lake.
- Mottville – A hamlet two miles north of Skaneateles village on Jordan Street and north of Willow Glen.
- Shepard Settlement – A farming hamlet.
- Skaneateles – A village at the north end of Skaneateles Lake.
- Skaneateles Falls – A hamlet northwest of Skaneateles village on Skaneateles Creek.
- Thornton Grove – A lakeshore neighborhood on the west shore of the lake south of Winding Way.
- Thornton Heights – A lakeshore neighborhood on the west shore of the lake home of the Veggie Stand.
- Wicks Corners – A neighborhood on the west town line, northwest of Skaneateles village.
- Willow Glen – A neighborhood on Old Seneca Turnpike, north of Skaneateles village.
- Winding Way – A neighborhood on the west shore of Skaneateles Lake.

== Notable people ==
- John Dodgson Barrow (1824–1906), Hudson River School artist
- Mary Elizabeth Beauchamp (1825–1903), educator and author
- Neilia Hunter Biden (1942–1972), first wife of Joe Biden; mother of Beau and Hunter Biden
- Barry Crimmins (1953–2018), comedian and activist
- Clara Cannucciari (1915–2013), web vlogger and author
- Sheldon Dibble (1809–1845), missionary
- Michelle Feldman (born 1976), former ten-pin bowler
- George Geddes (engineer) (1809–1883), engineer, agronomist, historian and New York State legislator
- Freeborn G. Jewett (1791–1858), member of the United States Congress; first Chief Judge of the New York Court of Appeals
- Virginia Loney (1899-1975), Lusitania survivor and socialite
- Nicholas Roosevelt (1767–1854), inventor of the steamboat vertical paddle wheel; member of the Roosevelt Family
- Samuel M. Roosevelt (1857–1920), artist and merchant; member of the Roosevelt Family
- Searles G. Shultz (1897–1976), lawyer and politician
- Marshall I. Ludington (1839–1919), quartermaster general of the U.S. Army
- James Reuel Smith (1852–1935), photographer known for his documentary photographs of springs and wells in New York City
- Tom Scherrer (born 1970), professional golfer, won PGA's Kemper Open in 2000 and won 3 times on the Nationwide tour
