= Jordan Village Historic District (Jordan, New York) =

Historic district in New York, United States

- U.S. National Register of Historic Places
- U.S. Historic district
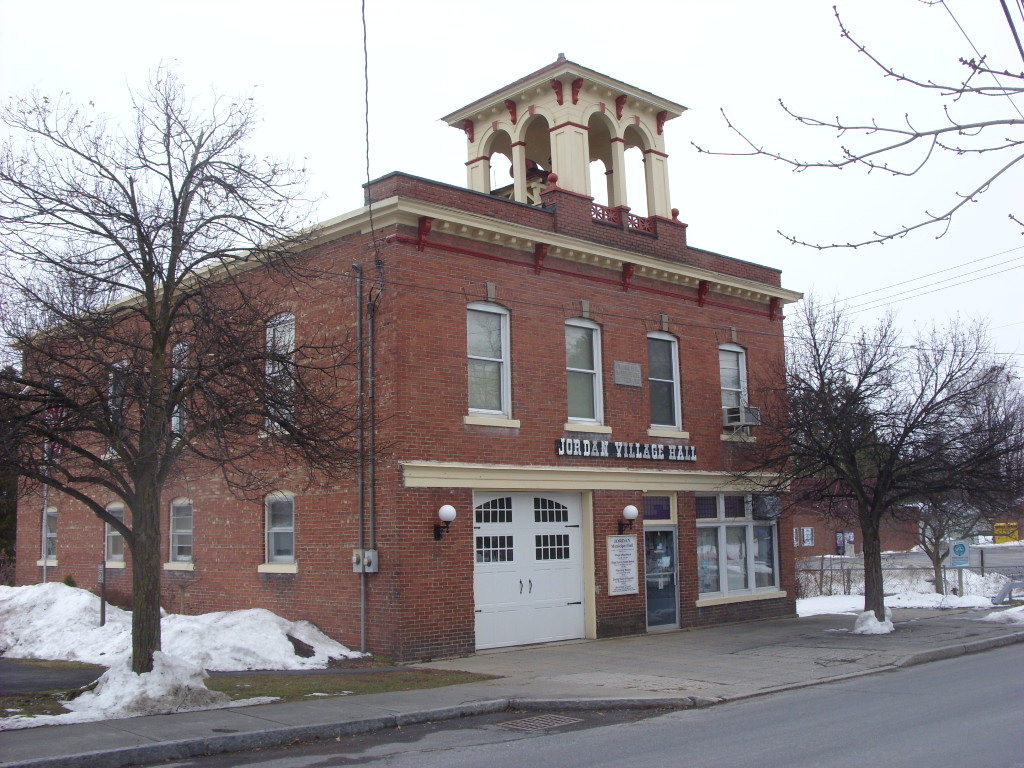
- Jordan Village Hall, December 2008

- Location within New York Location within the United States
- Location: Roughly bounded by N. Main, S. Main, Elbridge, Clinton, Hamilton, Lawrence, and Mechanic Sts., Jordan, New York
- Coordinates: 43°3′55″N 76°28′25″W
- Area: 34 acres (14 ha)
- Architectural style: Late Victorian
- NRHP reference No.: 83001753
- Added to NRHP: September 15, 1983

The Jordan Village Historic District in Jordan, New York is a 34 acres (14 ha) historic district that dates back to 1810. It was listed on the National Register of Historic Places in 1983 and includes 70 contributing buildings, 1 contributing site, and 2 contributing structures.
