= Skaneateles Lake =

Lake in Central New York, United States

- Sganya·daís (Onondaga)
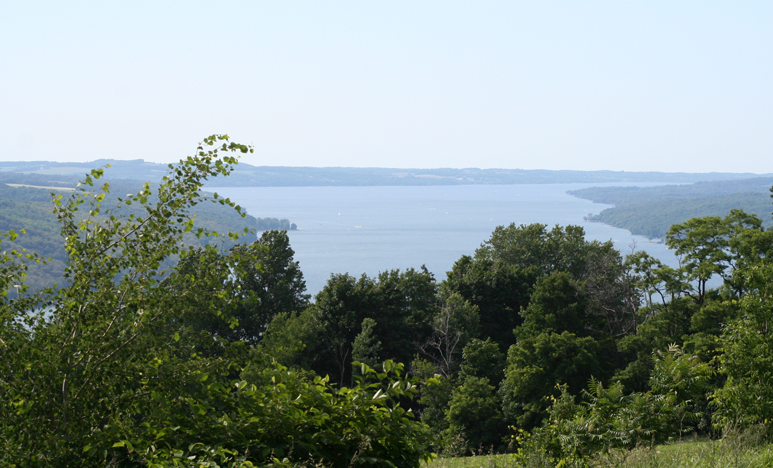

- Location within New York Skaneateles Lake (the United States)
- Location: Onondaga / Cayuga / Cortland counties, New York, United States
- Group: Finger Lakes
- Coordinates: 42°51′45″N 76°22′22″W
- Type: Ground moraine
- Primary outflows: Skaneateles Creek
- Basin countries: United States
- Max. length: 16 miles (26 km)
- Max. width: 1.5 miles (2.4 km) (at Edgewater Park)
- Surface area: 8,800 acres (3,600 ha)
- Average depth: 148 ft (45 m)
- Max. depth: 315 ft (96 m)
- Water volume: 0.385 cu mi (1.60 km^{3})
- Residence time: 18 years
- Surface elevation: 863.27 ft (263.12 m)
- Settlements: Skaneateles, New York

The eleven Finger Lakes of New York State.

Skaneateles Lake (/ˌskæniˈætləs/ SKAN-ee-AT-ləs, locally /ˌskɪn-/ SKIN-) is a Finger Lake in central New York state, United States. The name Sganya·daís means "long lake" in the Onondaga language. The lake spans three counties, and is sometimes referred to as "The Roof Garden of the Lakes" because its elevation (863.27 ft or 263.12 m) is higher than the other Finger Lakes. It is one of the cleanest lakes in the United States.

It is 16 mi (26 km) long (17 mi or 27 km long including the bogs at the south end of the lake) and on average 0.75 mi (1.21 km) wide, with a surface area of 13.6 sq mi (35 km^{2}), and a maximum depth of 315 ft (96 m). The lake drains north via Skaneateles Creek, which flows into the Seneca River.

The cleanest of the Finger Lakes, its water is so pure that the city of Syracuse and other municipalities use it unfiltered. The City of Syracuse spends about $2.3 million a year to protect lake quality; sixteen people inspect (usually twice a year) each of the 2600 properties in the watershed, which is relatively small compared to other Finger Lakes. The lake is the second cleanest lake in the United States as measured by dissolved nitrogen, after Crater Lake in Oregon.

William Henry Seward called it "The most beautiful body of water in the world."

== Description ==
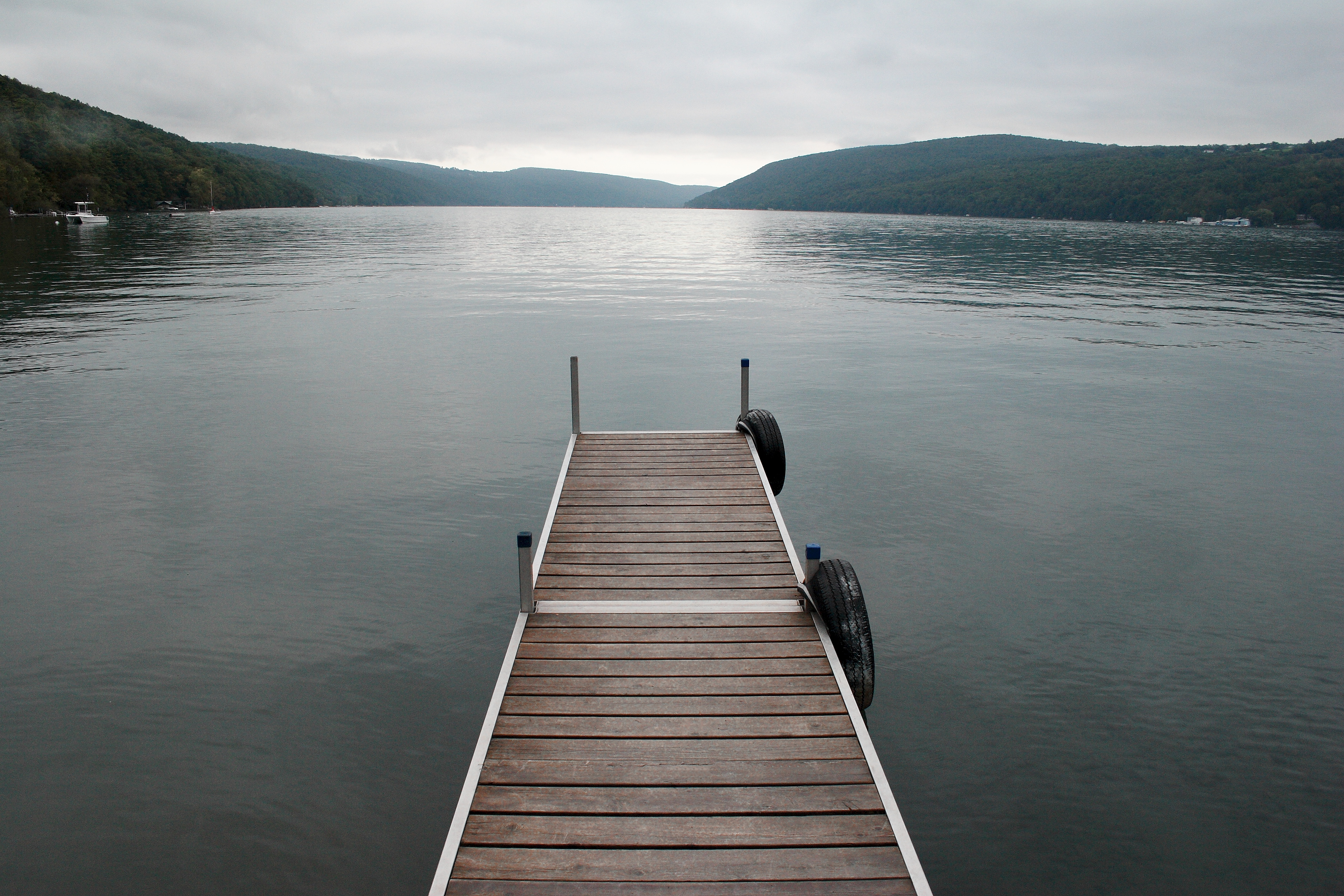
Dock on Skaneateles Lake

The shores of Skaneateles Lake are in three counties: Onondaga, Cayuga, and Cortland. The village of Skaneateles (population about 2,450) is at the northern end of the lake, in Onondaga County. Summer cottages appeared in 1881, increasing to more than 2000 residences around the lake in 2002. Generally new homes now are built for year-round occupancy rather than summer use and many summer cottages are replaced. The transient and seasonal population of this tourist destination and summer resort surges during the warmer months.

Skaneateles Lake is separated from two other nearby Finger Lakes, Otisco and Owasco, by ridges some 600 feet above the waters, giving scenic views on both sides. Much of the highland terrain is forested, with several large public preserves. Once more cultivated, this region was known for the teasel industry until 1930. Teasels were employed commercially by woollen mills to raise the nap on the material. Although some dairy farms remain in the highlands, occasionally remaining in the same family after many generations, much of the land no longer serves agriculture. There is some experimentation with introduction of vineyards, which have proved successful on the more western Finger Lakes. However, the environs of Skaneateles Lake, at an elevation of 863 feet, may offer a less agreeable microclimate for wine grapes than larger, deeper and lower lakes.

== Landmarks and features ==
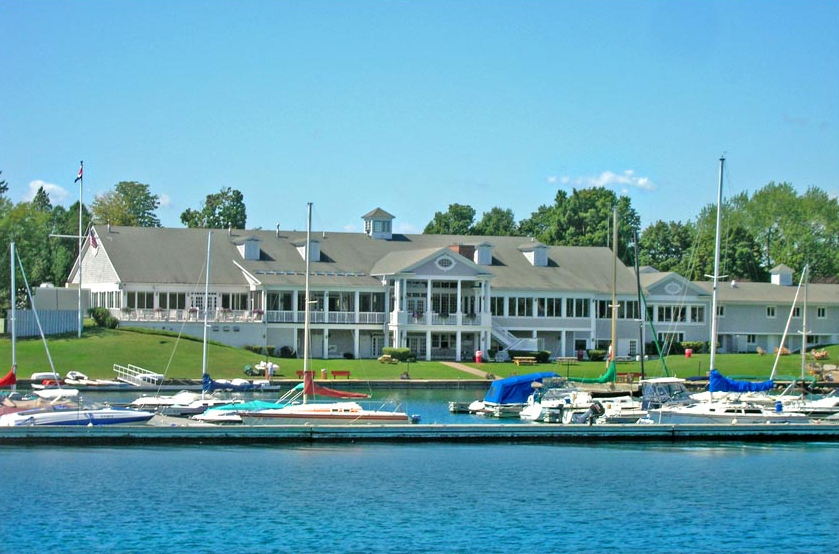
Skaneateles Country Club

Landmarks and scenic features appear around the lake. Many historic buildings enhance the village of Skaneateles. Carpenter Falls are near the hamlet of New Hope about one mile inland from the southwest shore of the Lake. The hike down to the main waterfall from the road above is on an unimproved cliff face and quite dangerous. The falls are part of the Bahar Nature Preserve that extends along Bear Swamp Creek to the lake. The historic New Hope Mill (closed to public permanently) is nearby. Opposite Carpenter Point is Ten Mile Point, a favorite picnic destination. The southern end of the lake, bounded by high hills (below, right) differs in character from the north. Glen Haven, a hamlet located there, once featured a large resort hotel but now offers smaller visitor accommodations and seasonal dining. From 1860-1900, Dr. W. C. Thomas offered a water cure treatment at the Hotel Glen Haven. On the west side, the high Town of Niles, New York provides scenic prospects. On the east side, the high Town of Spafford offers panoramic views. Between these towns lies deep Glen Haven valley in the Town of Scott, New York, in the third county. The hamlet of Borodino in Spafford retains an 1830 church, little altered, in the Federal style and noted as a center of the abolitionist movement where Frederick Douglass spoke.

The lake has long been popular for recreational sailing. Regattas with yachts from other lakes as well as Skaneateles began in 1847. The Skaneateles Country Club now has a boating center. The Lightning, a racing dinghy, was designed and produced in Skaneateles, as was the Comet. There are few marinas or other commercial facilities on the lake shore. There is a New York state public boat launch site on the lake's west side just south of the Skaneateles Country Club marina. Also, on the west side of the lake, about 6 miles south of the Skaneateles Country Club Marina, in the hamlet Mandana, lies the Skaneateles Marina. The town of Spafford has a public boat launch near Borodino on the east side of the lake about four miles south of the Skaneateles Sailing Club. Glen Haven, at the head of the lake (The Finger Lakes flow South to North), offers a marina and docking. Cruises are available from the village. A mailboat serving cottages along the lake also carries passengers.

== Wildlife ==
In its 2012 Angler Diary, the New York State Department of Environmental Conservation cites thirteen species of fish that live in Skaneateles Lake. These species include: rainbow trout, lake trout, lake whitefish, landlocked salmon, smallmouth bass, cisco, rock bass, chain pickerel, pumpkinseed, yellow perch, brown bullhead, bluegill, and common carp. The lake trout are naturally reproducing, while 20,000 rainbow trout and 9,000 landlocked salmon are stocked annually.

A large die-off of bass in the spring of 2007 was later confirmed to be due to viral hemorrhagic septicema (VHS), a virus-caused fish disease that has killed millions of fish in the Great Lakes since its presence was noticed in the region in 2005. This is the second of the Finger Lakes found to be contaminated with the virus, after its presence was detected in the westernmost of the Finger Lakes, Conesus Lake, in 2006. The virus and disease are not a threat to human health, but the state of New York is working to slow its spread to other lakes. New state bait regulations were announced on June 6, 2007, aimed at curbing the spread of VHS. VHS can be spread between bodies of water through live or frozen bait fish, roe, live wells, and ballast water, among other ways. Boats and fishing equipment should be disinfected before transfer from Skaneateles Lake to other bodies of water.

== Environmental issues ==
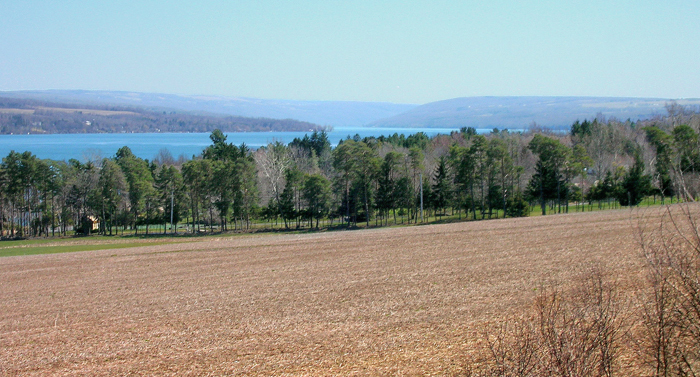
Run-off from agricultural land around the lake is a source of pollutants such as pesticides and fertilizer

According to the United States Environmental Protection Agency, the lake is affected by pollution from agriculture sources (pesticide and fertilizer use, manure production, and sedimentation), residential sources (septic systems, lawn care, and construction), and streambank erosion. Contaminants from these sources include sediment, nitrogen- and phosphorus-based nutrients, pesticides, bacteria (including fecal coliform), viruses, and protozoa such as giardia and cryptosporidium. The lake has an unusually low watershed-to-lake ratio, and is considered oligotrophic, meaning it is low in nutrients such as nitrogen and phosphorus. The water is clear and low in vegetation. However, the water clarity quality has reduced in recent years because of massive algal bloom outbreaks.

A stiff, sticky foam on the lake was reported in 2013 to have been visibly increasing for years. The foam accumulates on shorelines and in bays after strong winds. According to the Skaneateles Lake Association, a preliminary analysis indicated the source of the foam was anionic surfactants released during the natural breakdown of organic matter. The phenomenon was reported on other nearby lakes as well.

In 2017, the lake experienced a widespread blue-green algal bloom which tested positive for microcystin toxins, thus no longer making it one of the cleanest lakes in the US.

In July 2025, Rachel DeWitt, age 30, swam the full 16-mile length of the lake from north to south to raise awareness of the importance of preserving the environmental integrity of the lake.
