= Women's club movement in the United States =

Women's social movement

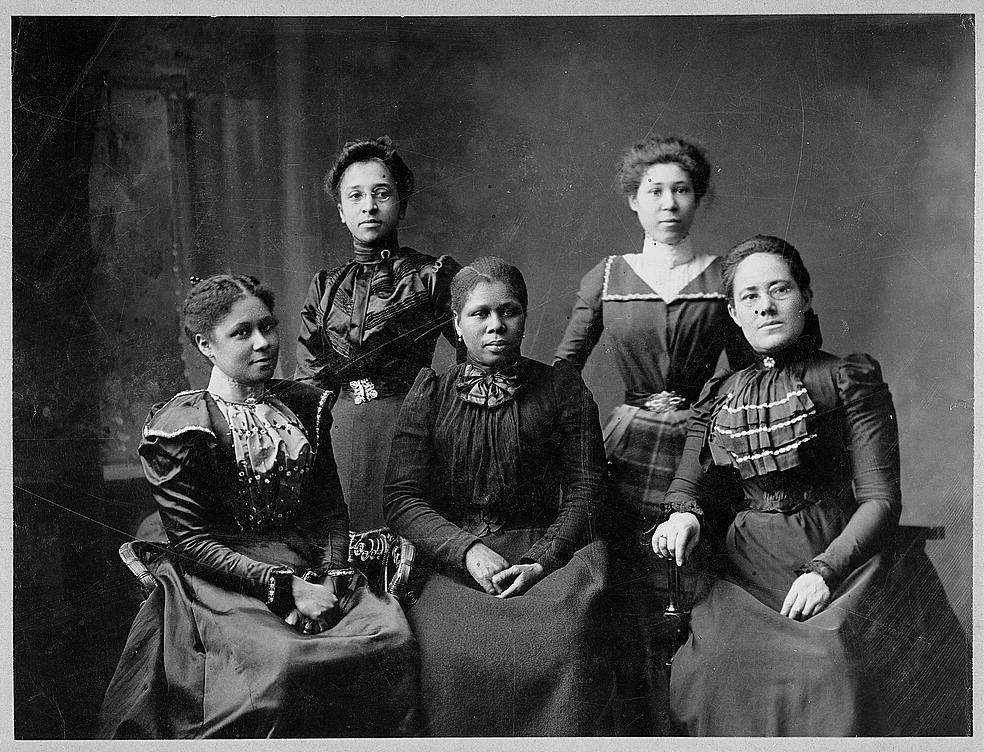
Five women officers of the Women's League in Newport, Rhode Island, c. 1899

The club movement is an American women's social movement that started in the mid-19th century and spread throughout the United States. It established the idea that women had a moral duty and responsibility to transform public policy. While women's organizations had existed earlier, it was not until the Progressive era (1896–1917) that they came to be considered a movement. The first wave of the club movement during the progressive era was started by white, middle-class, Protestant women, and a second phase was led by African-American women.

These clubs, most of which had started out as social literary gatherings, eventually became a source of reform for various issues in the U.S. Both African-American and white women's clubs were involved with issues surrounding education, temperance, child labor, juvenile justice, legal reform, environmental protection, library creation and more. Women's clubs helped start many initiatives such as kindergartens and juvenile court systems. Later, women's clubs tackled issues like women's suffrage, lynching and family planning. The clubs allowed women, who had little political standing at the time, to gain greater influence in their communities. As women gained more rights, the need for clubs to exercise political and social influence became less important. Over time, participation in women's clubs has waned in the United States. However, many clubs still continue to operate and influence their communities.

== About ==
The club movement became part of Progressive era social reform, which was reflected by many of the reforms and issues addressed by club members. According to Maureen A. Flanagan, many women's clubs focused on the welfare of their community because of their shared experiences in tending to the well-being of home-life. Tending to the community was often called "municipal housekeeping" during the Progressive era and reflected a shared belief by many club members that home and city life were linked through city hall. By constructing the idea of municipal housekeeping, women were also able to justify their involvement in government. Later, in 1921, Alice Ames Winter describes how women had begun to see "their homes as the units out of which society was built", and that home life and public life were linked. Women's clubs "established the idea that women had a moral duty and responsibility to transform, define and shape public policy". Women's clubs were also "training schools" for women who wanted to get involved in the public sphere. They helped women attain both social and political power.

Many women's clubs increased their memberships by having other members sponsor or nominate new members to the group. Clubs often organized themselves by committee, or division. Many women's clubs created and occupied their own clubhouses. Today these clubhouses have continued to be the site of women's meetings and other gatherings. Some women's clubs created and continue to publish their own journals and newsletters.

== History ==
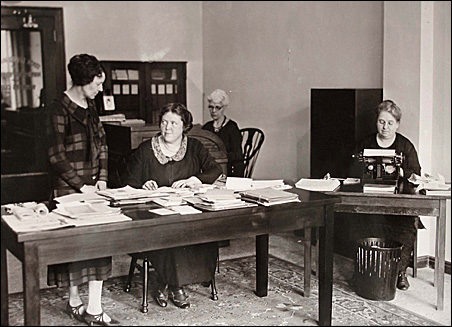
The headquarters of the Minnesota Federation of Women's Clubs in Minneapolis, c. 1920

Prior to the founding of the first Progressive era women's clubs, Sorosis and the New England Women's Club, most organizations for women were auxiliaries of groups for men or were church-related. Jane Cunningham Croly of the General Federation of Women's Clubs (GFWC) wrote in 1898 that women were first able to reach out of their homes through religious institutions.

By becoming involved in church or charitable groups, women were able to find companionship and a way to facilitate change in their communities. It was also one of the few ways that women were initially allowed to contribute outside of the home. Some of the earliest women-led organizations were started as religious groups in the early part of the nineteenth century. White women were involved in church charity groups as early as the 1790s.

Later, women also started to become involved in antislavery groups, temperance groups and women's suffrage organizations starting in the 1840s. African-American women helped organize many anti-slavery groups, the earliest founded in 1832, and white women followed black women's lead in creating abolition groups.

As women began to have more leisure time, they started women's clubs. Initially, most women's clubs focused on literary endeavors, self-improvement and created social opportunities for white middle-class women. These clubs allowed women to share ideas and helped them realize that their thoughts were important, and that together they could act on them. Literary women's clubs in pioneer areas gave women an outlet to explore reading and make friends. Many women's clubs maintained book collections for use by club members. Instead of forming a literary club, women in Galveston created a scientific club, which also focused on learning.

Croly notes that women's clubs were not created to copy men's groups; instead, they were often created to give women a space to share ideas as equals; these ideas often developed into practical action. As Mary I. Wood and Anna J. H. (Mrs. Percy V.) Pennybacker described it: "Very early the club women became unwilling to discuss Dante and Browning over the teacups, at meetings of their peers in some lady's drawing room, while unsightly heaps of rubbish flanked the paths over which they had passed in their journeys thither." Women justified their movement into social reform by using the Victorian idea that women were naturally morally superior to men. As clubs moved from self-improvement to community improvement, women's clubs in the Western U.S. lagged somewhat behind clubs formed in more developed parts of the country. Women's clubs in the late 1800s described themselves as attempting to "exert a refining and ennobling influence" on their communities. They also saw women's clubs as an intellectual and practical good which would create better women and a better country.

Sorosis and the GFWC saw large increases in membership in 1889 and 1890. The GFWC grew to around a million women by 1910, and to a million and a half by 1914. The creation of an umbrella organization for the many women's clubs allowed them to work together in a more coordinated fashion. However, the GFWC excluded African-American clubs from its membership, and many white clubs during the late 1800s excluded black women as well as Jewish women from membership. White women's clubs ignored racial inequalities because of the controversy surrounding the issue, and even if they addressed racial inequalities, they did so "tactfully in order to gain members and support". Some white women's clubs were frankly unconcerned with issues relating to African Americans because they "supported the racist ideology and practices of their era".

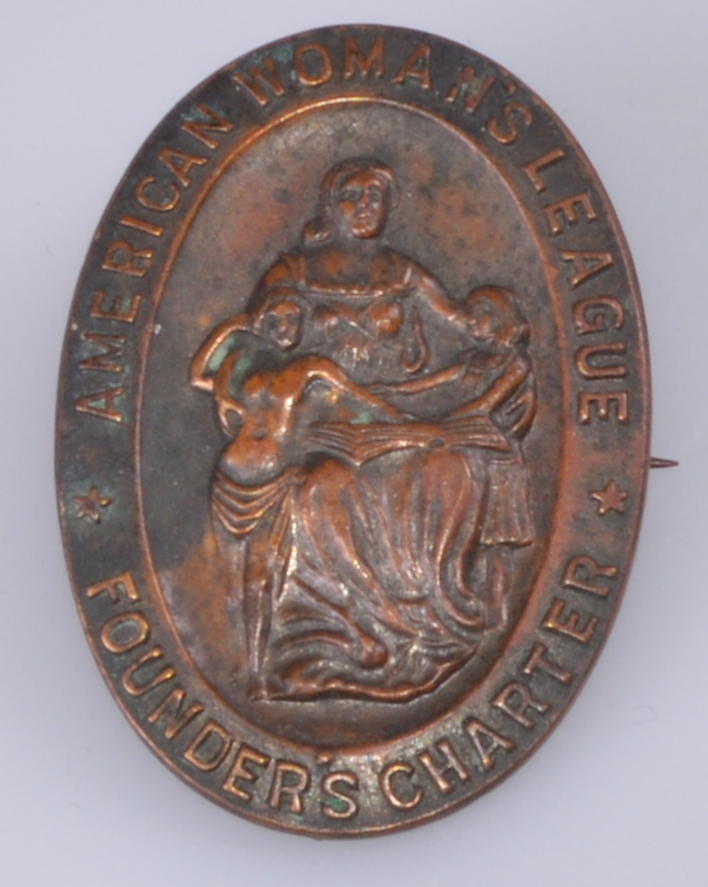
American Woman's League Founder's Chapter membership pin, image designed by George Julian Zolnay, awarded to members who sent in two new applicants for full membership and $5 in subscriptions by Christmas 1909.

In 1907, magazine publisher Edward Gardner Lewis created the American Woman's League as a marketing venture in support of his publications, Woman's Magazine and the Woman's Farm Journal, which formed local women's "Chapter Houses". Many evolved into prominent women's clubs and the network later became a more traditional organization with dues paid to its national office, the "American Woman's Republic".

Women's clubs were very active in women's suffrage (see below) and helped support the war effort during World War I. Women in clubs raised money, worked with the Red Cross, financed the Home Guard and set up communications within the community to share information quickly. Women's clubs also knitted socks, rolled bandages for soldiers and sold war bonds. In Texas, the Texas Federation of Women's Clubs (TFWC) helped create recreational canteens for soldiers. During the 1930s, women's clubs hosted programs in concert with the Works Progress Administration. When World War II broke out, women's clubs were involved in volunteering.

In 1964, Congress passed the Civil Rights Act, then, in 1966, the National Organization for Women (NOW) was formed, and women's clubs again grew in size.

While there were many organizations that encouraged change around child labor, the GFWC became advocates for some of the first child labor laws. Children were hired because they were cheaper and more manageable than adults. During the early 1900s, women's labor organizations were formed to protect their rights. Among them, was Lenora O'Reilly who helped develop the WTUL that supported wage requests and promoted the end of child labor.

=== African-American club movement ===
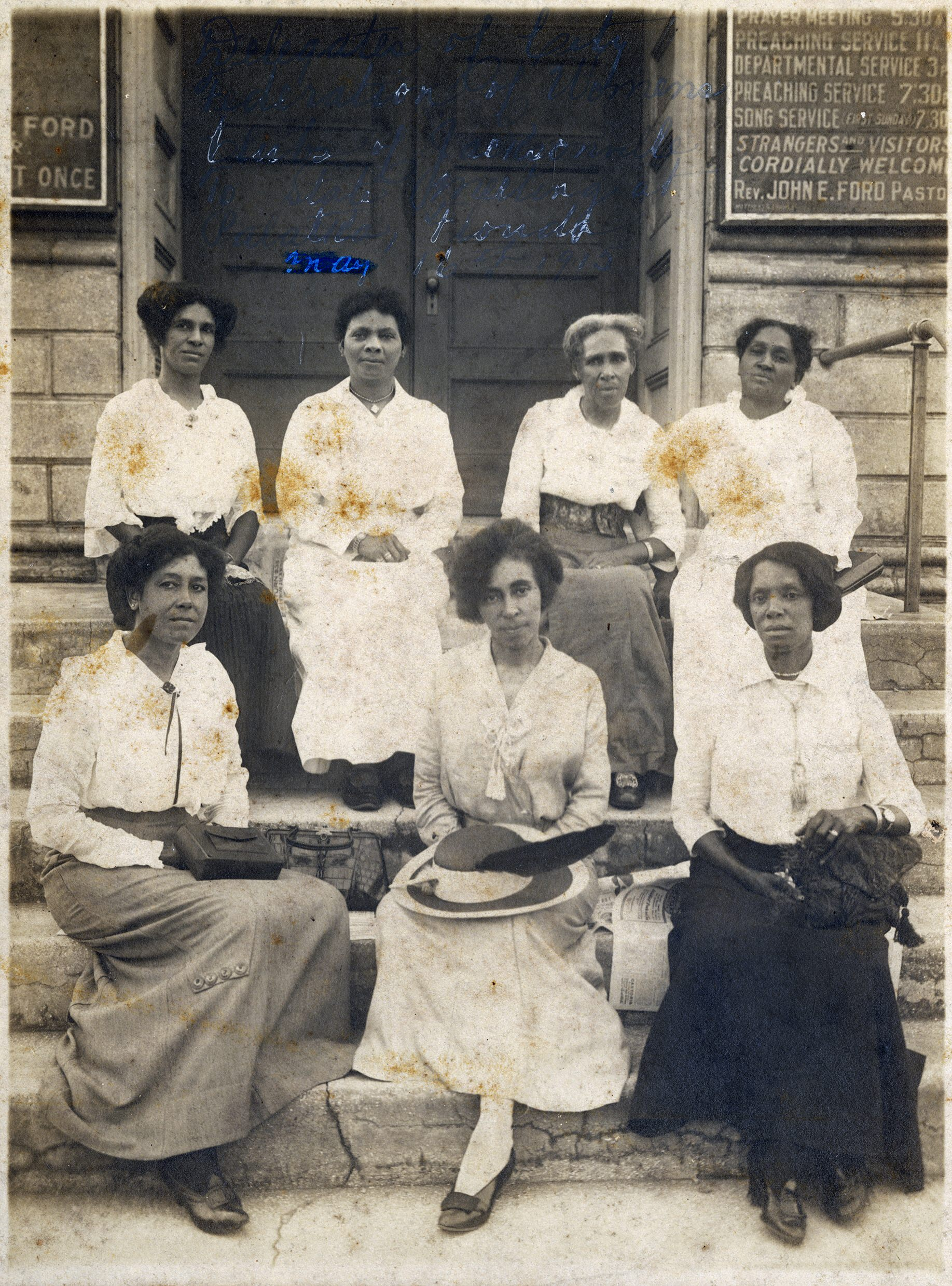
Eartha White (center, first row) is pictured with delegates at the State Meeting of the City Federation of Colored Women's Clubs of Jacksonville, at Palatka, Florida – May 16, 1915.

Even before African Americans were freed from slavery, black women had started to come together to create organizations which looked after their community's welfare. Black women were very quick to "organize themselves for self-help". One of the first African-American women's club was the Female Benevolent Society of St. Thomas, in Philadelphia, which was started in 1793. At the time, Philadelphia had numerous black organizations. After the African Benevolent Society in Newport, Rhode Island, would not allow women to be officers or vote, women created their own group. Another group, the Colored Female Religious and Moral Society in Salem, Massachusetts was created in 1818. Black women's clubs helped raise money for the anti-slavery newspaper The North Star. Many black churches owed their existence to the dedicated work of African-American women organizing in their communities. Black women's literary clubs began to show up as early as 1831, with the Female Literary Society of Philadelphia.

After slavery was ended in the United States with the ratification of the 13th Amendment in 1865, black women continued to organize and often worked with churches to ensure their communities were taken care of. Many of these organizations were "so resilient that they were able to survive the twin disasters of bank failure and yellow fever". In 1868, black women's clubs were formed in Harris County, Texas. Between 1880 and 1920, black women in Indianapolis, Indiana had created more than 500 clubs addressing various issues.

During the Progressive era, many black women migrated to the Northern United States and into more urban areas. The club movement for black women in the 1890s began to focus on "social and political reform" and were more secular. Black women had to face the same issues as white women during this period but were often excluded from services and help that benefited whites only. Black women were not only excluded from white clubs but also from clubs created by black men. In addition, many black women felt as though they were defying stereotypes for their community. Women's clubs allowed black women to combat the period's stereotypes which "portrayed African American women as devoid of morality, sexually wanton and incapable of upholding marital and family responsibilities". Being a member of a women's club also helped give black women greater social standing in their communities.

Black colleges helped the creation of African-American women's clubs. Ida B. Wells was an important figure in the growth of these clubs during the Progressive Era. A number of clubs, named after her, were created in large cities across the country. In Chicago, the wealthy former abolitionist Mary Jane Richardson Jones supported the development of several clubs, serving as the first chair of Wells's. Other influential women's club organizers were Josephine St. Pierre Ruffin and Mary Church Terrell. In 1896, the National Association of Colored Women (NACW) was founded. The NACW grew out of anti-lynching campaigns spearheaded by Wells. Wells's anti-lynching campaign provoked the president of the Missouri Press Association who viciously attacked black women in a letter that was widely circulated among women's clubs by Ruffin. Ruffin eventually helped bring together the NACW, using the letter as a "call to action".

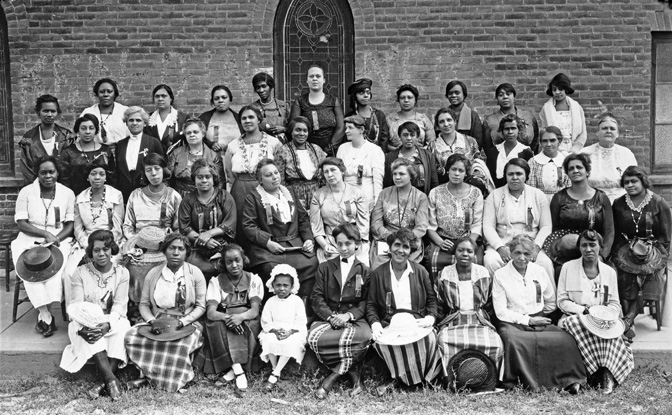
First Convention of the Montana Federation of Negro Women's Clubs, Butte, Montana, August 3, 1921

Both black and white women were involved in creating the National Association for the Advancement of Colored People (NAACP) in 1909 and were often involved in much of the organization's local work. By 1900, almost every black community had a women's club. By 1910, in proportion to population size, African-American women's clubs outpaced white women's clubs in the number of clubs created. By 1914, the NACW had fifty-thousand members and over a thousand clubs participating in the umbrella organization. Black women wanted to be visible and NACW helped them organize to improve conditions in their communities. There were also many African-American versions of the WCTU and the YWCA.

The NACW raised more than $5 million in war bonds during World War I. The Woman's Club of Norfolk wrote letters and sent care packages to the segregated black units sent to fight overseas. During the Great Depression, black women's clubs began to move towards "structural change and electoral politics". The National Council of Negro Women (NCNW) became a dominant group in the women's club movement in African-American circles. After World War II, working class and poor black women took the place of upper-class black women in organizing communities.

=== Faculty wives' clubs ===
Faculty wives' clubs began to be formed in many American universities in the early 20th century. They were brought together through the careers of the members' spouses. The clubs were localized around their particular affiliation and geographically restricted, thus most of their clubs did not receive the same volume of members nor the publicity of some of the earlier groups. However, their existence can still be seen in various archives at universities across the United States such as University of Washington, Kent State University, Emporia State University, and Ball State University.

These Faculty Wives clubs were formed during the Progressive era and served the same functions of community, cultural education, and service that characterized larger groups. One of the clubs' primary functions was fostering community among those affiliated with the university. The wives at Ball State University held regular dinners for their husbands, both to relieve stress and build relationships. At University of Washington the wives formed a "Newcomers club" to ensure that the new faculty wives felt welcome and included at the university.

Along with fostering relations, the various clubs volunteered their time and skills to benefit their wider community. At Emporia State University the Faculty Wives club made bandages for the Red Cross during World War I, and sewed regularly for the Red Cross during World War II. At Ball State University the club sewed regularly at the local hospital.

The Faculty Wives clubs were prominent throughout much of the 20th century. During the latter half, some of the clubs merged with other groups to form University Women's club, reflecting the change in faculty diversity and gender roles in the United States. Other wives clubs have remained independent and vibrant in their community, like the one at the University of Washington.

=== Decline of women's clubs in the 20th century ===
African-American women's clubs began to decline in the 1920s. By the 1960s, interest and membership in white women's clubs started to decline. As women had more opportunities to socialize, many clubs found their members were aging and were unable to recruit newer members.

Women's clubs began to turn over their work to city entities and became less influential. In addition, more women began to enter the workforce during the 1960s and had less spare time to devote to club work.

Many women today are working long hours or spending time with their children's extracurricular activities. By 2010, the number of women's clubs had significantly decreased across the country. This reflects a trend in all club memberships in the United States: most clubs are losing members because there is a lack of leisure time for younger people.

=== Women's clubs in the 21st century ===
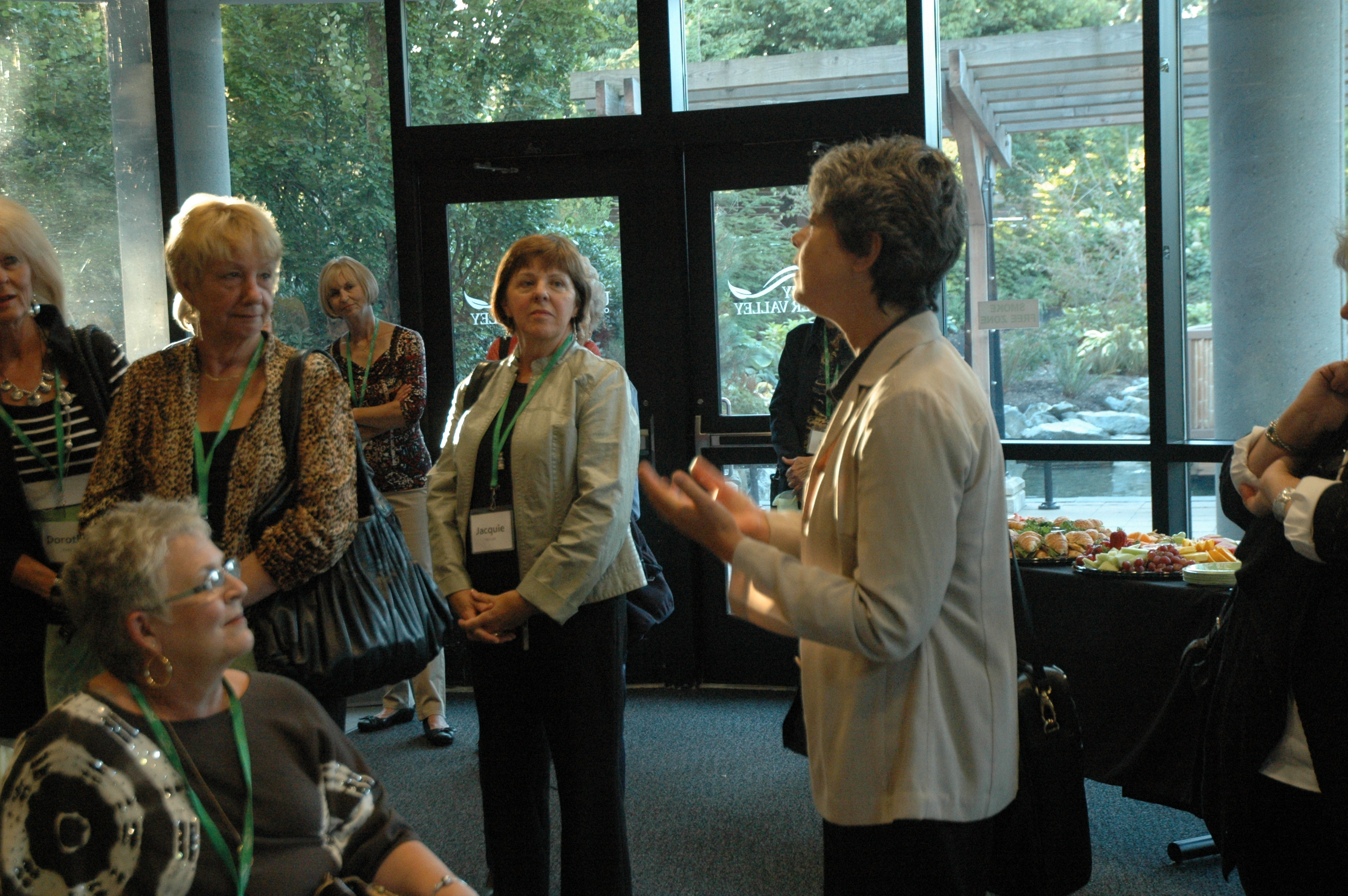
University Woman's Club at the University of the Fraser Valley, 2012

Some clubs are still active. The Houston Heights Woman's Club and The Women's Club of Forest Hills have found ways to reach out to younger residents in the community as recently as 2007 with the creation of an evening group. Some clubs have had success with creating programs that are meant to be attractive to younger women. The Des Moines Women's Club established in 1885, continues to support the community today with scholarships, an annual art exhibition, and continued support to its historic club house and museum, Hoyt Sherman Place. Shirlee Haizlip, president of the Ebell Club in Los Angeles, emphasizes what makes women's clubs unique: "It is a wondrous thing to be constantly surrounded by three generations of women."

Women's clubs continue their original missions of concern for the welfare of their communities. The GFWC gives out the Croly Award for excellence in journalism on topics relating to women. The GFWC also provides scholarships for women, especially those who have survived domestic violence. The NACWC continues to be one of the top ten non-profit organizations in the United States. It has adopted modern issues to tackle, such as fighting AIDS and violence against women. Many of today's women's clubs also provide cultural opportunities for their communities. Some groups continue to support their original missions, such as the Alpha Home, which provides care for elderly black people.

Women's clubs that endured into the modern era were adaptable in response to societal changes over time. The missions of women's clubs, like the Colony Club, founded in 1903, and the Cosmopolitan Club, founded in 1909, remain relevant today, and the clubs remain successful.

During the early 21st century, numerous new private women's clubs formed in support of personal and professional affiliations and business networking, including AllBright, Belizean Grove, The Riveter, The Wing and Chief, with growth attributed to factors including advances in technology and the isolation of the COVID-19 pandemic in the United States.

== Impact ==
Women's clubs, especially during the Progressive era, helped shape their communities and the country. Many progressive ideals were pressed into action through the resources of women's clubs, including kindergartens, juvenile courts, and park conservation. Women's clubs, many with their literary backgrounds, helped promote and raise money for schools, universities and libraries. Women's clubs were often at the forefront of various civil rights issues, denouncing lynching, promoting women's rights and voting rights.

=== Civil rights ===
Women's clubs helped promote civil rights, as well as improving conditions for black women in the country. Some women's clubs also worked to understand people's fear of immigrants during the late 1900s. Settlement houses, created by women's clubs, helped settle and integrate European immigrants.

The Fannie Jackson Coppin Club was created in 1899 by members of the Beth Eden Baptist Church, one of the oldest African-American religious institutions in Oakland, California, to "provide hospitality and housing services to African-American visitors who were not welcomed in the segregated hotels and other businesses" in the state. Some white women's clubs promoted desegregation early on, though these efforts were small in scope. The Chicago Woman's Club admitted a black member, Fannie Barrier Williams, only after a long approval process, which included the club deciding not to exclude anyone based on race. Few clubs worked together across racial boundaries, although the YWCA and the Association of Southern Women for the Prevention of Lynching (ASWPL) did sometimes welcome bi-racial collaboration.

The Woman's Missionary Council of the Southern Methodist Church spoke out against lynching. Women's clubs, like the Texas Association of Women's Clubs also denounced lynching. The purpose of the ASWPL was to end lynching in the United States.

Women's groups, like the NACWC, began to support desegregation in the 1950s. The Montana Federation of Colored Women's Clubs led campaigns for civil rights between 1949 and 1955. They also helped draft anti-segregation legislation. The initial organizer of the Montgomery bus boycott in 1955 was the Women's Political Council of Montgomery.

=== Education ===
Women's clubs were noted for promoting educational efforts around the country by their contemporaries. Putting women onto school boards was part of many women's club agendas in the late 1800s and early 1900s. Women's groups also influenced discussions about classroom size; the Chicago Woman's City Club asking that there be no more than thirty children per class. Chicago clubs also helped sponsor school lunches for students. Clubwomen have also protested cuts in teacher's salaries. Black women's clubs worked to create educational opportunities for their communities when these areas were ignored by white people.

Kindergartens and nursery schools in the United States were the creation of women's clubs. The first nursery school in the United States was created through women's clubs and club members in Chicago. The Woman's Club of El Paso started the first kindergarten in the state of Texas in 1893. Women's clubs were often involved with creating schools for delinquent boys and girls. The Texas Association of Women's Clubs (TAWC) worked for several decades to create what would later become the Crockett State School which was originally meant to help "delinquent" black girls.

Women's clubs were involved in vocational training and pushing for additional educational options for all young people. The Woman's City Club worked with the Chicago Woman's Club and the Association of Collegiate Alumnae to create a Bureau of Vocational Supervision which could take a "personal interest in schoolchildren, working directly to place them in appropriate jobs when they left school". The Bureau also created scholarships for needy students. The Chicago Woman's Club raised $40,000 to create an industrial school for boys in Glenwood, Illinois. Hester C. Jeffrey established women's clubs which helped raise the funds for young black women to take classes at what would later become the Rochester Institute of Technology. Clubs, like the Chicago Woman's Club, taught the blind and provided job skills.

Many women's clubs believed that compulsory education for young people would help solve many child labor issues. In Chicago, the Woman's City Club worked with other clubs in order to help students stay in school past age 14. The Illinois Collegiate Alumnae association helped the government draw up a law in 1897 to ensure that children between the ages of seven and fourteen were in school for sixteen weeks of the year.

Women's clubs helped support and influence the creation of higher education. The Texas Federation of Women's Clubs "was a significant force behind the establishment of Texas Woman's University." Women's clubs helped raise money for new college buildings. Other clubs created scholarship funds for their communities. These organizations also helped produce research showing that higher education benefited women. Women's clubs today continue to sponsor scholarships for higher education.

==== Art and music ====
Women's club activities were seen by contemporaries as helping to spread art appreciation across the country. Clubwomen would often donate art to schools. Other clubs created traveling art collections and art libraries for communities. Clubs also hosted arts exhibits. The FFWC promoted Old Folks at Home by Stephen Foster as the state song.

African-American women promoted the arts, focusing on "celebrating African American traditions and culture." These included African-American music, theater and dance. Clubwomen saw themselves as carrying on both art and tradition of their lives in the late nineteenth century and early twentieth century. The Chicago and Northern District Association of Colored Women's Clubs (CNDA) hosted well-known singers such as Etta Moten. CNDA also hosted an exhibit of African art, literature, and music called The Negro in Art Week in 1927.

=== Environment and conservation ===
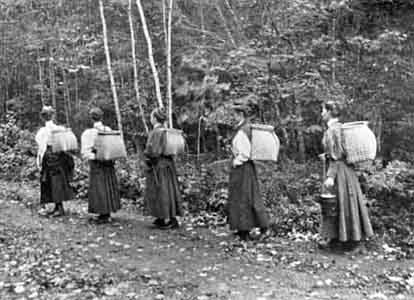
Women in the Adirondacks, photo by Katherine Elizabeth McClellan, 1898

Publication of Club Women of America on landscaping and advertising, c. 1926.

Women's clubs were involved in protecting natural resources. Many women's clubs started out by beautifying their cities and states. Clubs would sponsor and maintain playgrounds, and dedicate and maintain cemeteries. Later, clubs, like a Michigan women's club, would work to reforest parts of the state. In Idaho, women's clubs helped prevent logging in national forests. GFWC had been active since 1890 in areas related to forestry and had a forestry committee. This committee also disseminated information about conservation to the 800,000 members of the group. The GFWC later sponsored "a natural scenic area survey" of the United States in 1915 in order to discover areas that needed conservation. As women saw environmentally fragile areas start to be developed, many objected. Women worked within existing clubs, and also formed new conservation-based clubs, to protect the environment.

Women's clubs helped in the creation of the Mesa Verde National Park. Under the direction of Virginia McClurg, women's organizations in Colorado supported the creation of the park. The Colorado Federation of Women's Clubs (CFWC) helped McClurg, and created a committee that would eventually become the Colorado Cliff Dwellings Association. In California, women's clubs helped preserve Sequoia trees and protested against "the environmentally destructive Hetch Hetchy Dam". May Mann Jennings and the Florida Federation of Women's Clubs campaigned to create Florida's first state park in 1916, Royal Palm State Park which became the nucleus of Everglades National Park". Idaho women's clubs also helped establish some of the first national parks; and in Utah, women's clubs "were instrumental in preserving Monument Valley". Pennsylvanian women's clubs successfully lobbied for the creation of the Pennsylvania Department of Forestry. In 1916, the GFWC supported the creation of the National Park Service.

In the 1930s, clubwomen involved in the PEO Sisterhood, protected the Great Sand Dunes in Colorado. In New Mexico, the Valley of Fires Recreation Area was created through the work of the Carrizozo Woman's Club.

Women's clubs also helped preserve historical areas. As early as 1856, a women's organization, the Mount Vernon Ladies' Association, began the process of restoring and preserving Mount Vernon. In addition to their preservation and conservation efforts, women's clubs in the United States (especially women in the African American Club movement) pioneered environmental activism strategies that laid the foundation for later environmental justice organizing. In fact, many black women created "redemptive spaces" for black immigrants from the rural south in northern cities in the United States where they repurposed abandoned buildings as "community centers, settlement houses, parks and playgrounds."

==== Sanitation ====
The Woman's City Club and the City Club of Chicago both worked on issues relating to waste disposal. The Woman's City Club was, in contrast, more interested in the health and safety of the city as opposed to the men's group who were more interested in making money from sanitation. The Carrizozo Woman's Club of New Mexico helped bring sanitation to their city.

=== Health ===
Women's club members were involved in hospital reform and the creation of hospitals. In Seattle, Anna Herr Clise created what later became the Seattle Children's Hospital. Other clubs helped set up health centers and clinics.

Women's clubs were involved with improving public hygiene and food and drug safety. The Ladies' Health Protective Association was established in New York City in November 1884 to address unsanitary conditions in the abattoir district, and by 1897 had become a national organization. Women in The Pure Foods Movement, including the Pure Food Committee of the GFWC, were lobbied for a Federal bill known as the Pure Food and Drug Act. In Indiana, clubwomen "secured a state laboratory of hygiene under the control of the board of health, charged with the duty of examining food and drugs and aiding in the enforcement of health laws". Other clubs, like the Plymouth Woman's Club, undertook restaurant inspections on their own when there were no laws in place to regulate sanitary conditions. Women were also involved in promoting clean and safe drinking water in their communities.

Many women's clubs were involved in the birth control movement and promoted sex education. Women's clubs promoted talks from experts on birth control. The Chicago Women's Club helped organize the Illinois Birth Control League, which later set up clinics around Chicago. In Reading, Pennsylvania in 1937, Margaret Sanger was a sponsored speaker on a radio program sponsored by the Woman's Club.

=== Libraries ===
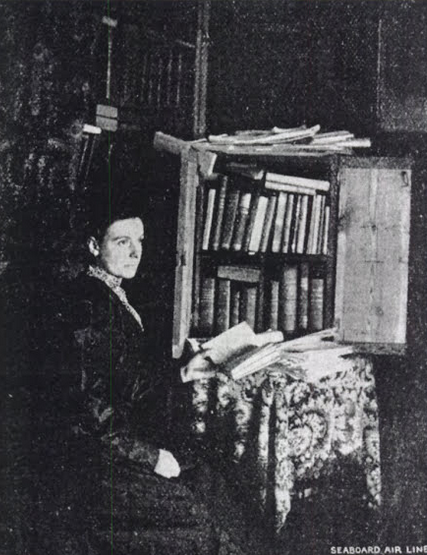
Willie Massey, head of the library in Van Wyck, South Carolina. 1899

The GFWC developed a national agenda for libraries across the country. Clubwomen believed that having access to books made people's lives better. Women's clubs helped establish many public libraries by contributing their book collections, raising money for building construction through a variety of activities for years, acting as librarians, cataloguing early collections, enlisting male leaders for public funding, and other management activities. After the public libraries were established, women's clubs lobbied on behalf of the public libraries in state legislatures and also for funding from the Carnegie Library Endowment. According to the American Library Association (ALA) and GFWC, women's clubs are estimated to have started between 75 and 80 percent of the public libraries in the United States. In New York, Melvil Dewey found clubwomen in his state to "be staunch allies".

Often, women's clubs had created their own private libraries, and from this experience wished to create community libraries for everyone to use. Many women's clubs made the creation of public libraries an important part of their mission. The Woman's Club of Bala Cynwyd was formed with the main initial purpose of creating of a public library in Bala Cynwyd, Pennsylvania. In Colorado, women's clubs established "traveling libraries" in conjunction with the state government. They were well-received and very popular in the early 1900s around the country. In Georgia, clubwomen used their traveling libraries to help combat illiteracy in both the white and black communities. In South Carolina, the traveling libraries belonged to women's clubs, but were available to the public.

Cherokee County, Texas saw the creation of its first public library with the founding of the Bachelor Girl's Literary Club. The El Paso Public Library was created largely by members of the Woman's Club of El Paso. In Texas, the Texas Federation of Women's Clubs (TFWC) helped influence the creation of the Texas State Library and Archives Commission and the Texas Historical Commission. Around seventy percent of all libraries in Texas were brought into existence because of TFWC. Clubwomen in Mount Pleasant, Iowa, helped secure taxes to support their public library. Other clubs, like those in Kentucky and Tennessee, taxed club memberships to support their libraries. When libraries were threatened with elimination, clubs like the Woman's Club of Norfolk protested.

=== Reform ===
==== Labor ====
Women's clubs were involved in tracking and investigating child labor and working conditions of all workers in the United States in the late nineteenth century. Clubwomen worked to reduce the number of hours children were allowed to work in the state of Indiana.

Some women's clubs became active in labor strikes. The Woman's City Club of Chicago became involved in strike resolution. The Woman's City Club also demanded that picketers be protected by policewomen. The Woman's Club of Chicago helped form the Illinois Woman's Alliance (IWA) in order to "prevent the exploitation of women in sweatshops". Women-led organizations, like the National Consumers League (NCL), developed a "white label" for stores that met the organization's standards for minimum wages and decent working hours.

==== Legal reform ====
Women's clubs helped establish juvenile courts. The first juvenile court was established in Chicago in 1899 through the urging of the Chicago Woman's Club whose members felt that children should not be treated as adults by the court. Clubwomen from the Chicago Woman's Club went to court with many of the children in order to ensure they were being treated fairly. The Chicago Woman's Club also established a Protective Agency for Women and Children in 1886.

Juvenile law in Chicago also recognized children who were without legal guardians and who should be dependent on the state. By 1906, there were juvenile courts in twenty-five states. These courts were praised by contemporaries, like Mrs. John Dickinson Sherman, who wrote in 1906 of the establishment of the juvenile courts, "If the whole club movement of the six states in the last ten years had accomplished nothing else it would still be well worth while." Women's clubs helped pass juvenile court laws in Ohio, Missouri, and in Los Angeles.

Women's clubs helped work towards marriage reforms which would benefit women. An act passed on March 2, 1907, called the Expatriation Act, required that when a woman married, she took on the citizenship of her husband. For women to attain a civic or legal identity, such as the right to vote, they needed to have independence from their husbands' citizenship. Marriage laws in 1921 still had separate standards for married women's citizenship status depending on her state of residence. Finally, in 1922, the United States Congress passed the Married Women's Act, granting married women their own nationality in the United States. In 1936, Congress created a provision for women who had lost their citizenship due to marriage, and were no longer married, to re-swear allegiance to the United States.

Women's clubs also looked at issues of consent. The Chicago Woman's Club, which created the Protective Agency for Women and Children, presented bills to the legislature which later passed. One raised the age of consent from 14 to 18. Women's clubs helped assert the right of women to refuse to have sex with their husbands if they chose.

==== Prison reform ====
The Women's Christian Temperance Union (WCTU) of Washington state was involved in urging the city of Spokane to hire a female jail matron for women prisoners in 1902. Elizabeth Gurley Flynn helped expose sexual abuse of women prisoners in the jails during the Free Speech Movement of 1909, and helped to push the city to finally install a female jail matron in Spokane. The Chicago Woman's Club advocated for a female jail matron in 1884. In Los Angeles, clubwomen were able to influence the city to appoint female police officers.

==== Fashion ====
Women's clubs were also interested in reforming fashion. Some reform centered around corsets and how tight clothing was starting to be considered unhealthy. Women's clubs also spoke out against the use of bird feathers in women's fashion.

Besides reform, women's clubs also used fashion as a way to showcase creative arts. Fashion shows put on by the CNDA in the 1930s and 1940s featured recitals of music and dance, which were held at the Savoy Ballroom.

=== Suffrage ===
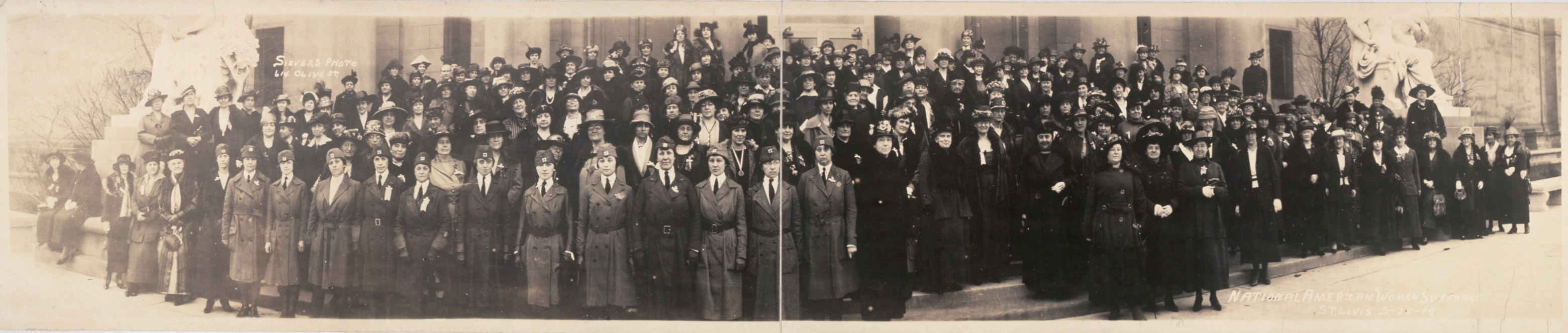
National American Women Suffrage, St. Louis, March 25, 1919

Women's clubs became very active in women's suffrage. Before women had the right to vote, women's clubs needed to partner with sympathetic organizations run by men. The focus on women's suffrage began during the last half of the nineteenth century. In 1868, Kate Newell Doggett, a botanist, helped set up a chapter of Sorosis, which became the first women's group in Chicago to focus on suffrage. Later, the Chicago Woman's Club would help promote suffrage.

Other organizations, dedicated especially to suffrage began to be formed after the Civil War. As women's clubs grew, so did suffrage organizations.

African-American women's clubs like the NACW not only fought for women's suffrage but also for the right of black men to vote. Many black women were involved in groups like the National Woman Suffrage Association (NWSA) and the American Woman Suffrage Association (AWSA). Women involved in the National Baptist Woman's Convention also supported suffrage.

Women's clubs hosted talks about suffrage and invited suffrage leaders to speak. After women won the right to vote, women's clubs continued in helping women exercise their rights and how to best use their votes. However, another factor in earning the right to vote was a decline in membership until the Great Depression, when women got together again for charitable work.

=== Temperance ===
Women's clubs such as the Women's Christian Temperance Union (WCTU) were involved with advocating the prohibition of alcohol. The Florida Federation of Women's Clubs (FFWC) also supported temperance in that state. Numerous women involved with the temperance movement felt that limiting alcohol access would decrease "social ills" such as gambling, prostitution and domestic violence. Many women involved in the temperance movement felt that securing women's right to vote would help promote prohibition of alcohol. Both black and white temperance groups promoted women's suffrage.

== Notable clubs ==
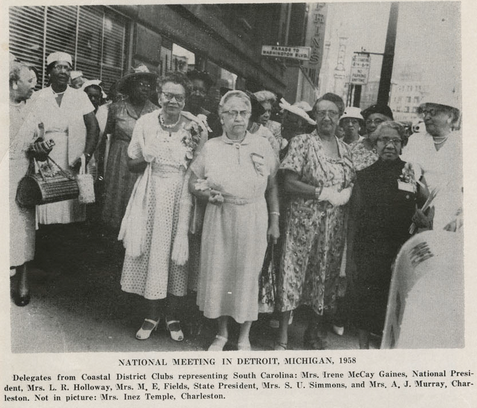
Delegates representing South Carolina women's clubs in Detroit in 1958

- Alpha Suffrage Club
- Association of Collegiate Alumnae
- Association of Southern Women for the Prevention of Lynching
- Atlanta Neighborhood Union
- Charlotte Woman's Club
- Chicago Woman's Club
- Colonial Dames of America
- Colored Female Religious and Moral Society
- Daughters of the American Revolution
- Ebell Society
- Francisca Club
- Frederick Douglass Woman's Club
- General Federation of Women's Clubs
- Houston Heights Woman's Club
- Indiana State Federation of Colored Women's Clubs
- League of Women Voters
- Mississippi State Federation of Colored Women's Clubs
- Mount Vernon Ladies' Association
- National Association of Colored Women (NACW)
- National Council of Jewish Women
- National Society of the Colonial Dames of America
- New England Women's Club
- Phillis Wheatley Club
- San Pedro Woman's Club
- Sorosis
- South Carolina Federation of Colored Women's Clubs (SCRCWC)
- Sulgrave Club
- Texas Association of Women's Clubs
- Texas Federation of Women's Clubs
- United Daughters of the Confederacy
- Women's Christian Temperance Union
- Women's Club of El Paso
- Women's City Club of New York (WCC)
- Woman's Health Protective Association
- Women's Joint Congressional Committee
- Young Women's Christian Association (YWCA)

== See also ==
- List of women's clubs
- Feminism in the United States
- Gentlemen's clubs
- Women-only space
- Woman's Christian Temperance Union
- Membership discrimination in California social clubs
- History of antisemitism in the United States
- Racial segregation in the United States
