= Timothy Brei =

Professor of Neurodevelopmental Pediatrics

- Born: Fremont, Nebraska
- Education: Midland University (Undergraduate) University of Nebraska Medical Center (MD) Cincinnati Children's Hospital Medical Center (Fellowship)
- Occupations: Professor of Neurodevelopmental Pediatrics, Medical Director of the Spina Bifida Association of America

Timothy Brei is a professor of neurodevelopmental pediatrics at the University of Washington and a developmental pediatrician at Seattle Children's Hospital. He is also the medical director of the Spina Bifida Association of America. Brei's research has focused on healthcare outcomes for children with spina bifida and as an adult with spina bifida who is an uncommon leader, he has also served as an advocate.

Brei has received extensive recognition for his work in developmental pediatrics. He has been quoted by many media outlets such as US News. Annually, the Spina Bifida Association of America presents the Timothy Brei, MD, Outstanding Healthcare Professional Award to individuals have made a significant impact in spina bifida treatment and care.

== Early life and education ==
Brei was born in Fremont, Nebraska in 1956 and was diagnosed with spina bifida. During this time, prenatal ultrasound had not been invented, so Brei's diagnosis came as a surprise to his parents.

Brei grew up in rural Nebraska. With no cure for spina bifida in the 1950s and limited medical interventions, Brei's parents fostered independence from an early age. At the age of four, Brei began playing piano. Later, he attended school at a two-room schoolhouse in rural Nebraska. In high school, he participated in musical activities such as all-state choir and all-state band. With Brei's academic success, he received scholarship support to attend Midland University in Fremont, Nebraska.

At Midland University, Brei was involved in various extracurriculars such as the touring choir and decided that he wanted to pursue a career as a physician. At this time, the Americans with Disabilities Act (ADA) had not been passed and very few people with disabilities were accepted into medical school. Brei was initially not accepted into medical school and began a graduate program in Biology at the University of Nebraska–Lincoln. The following year, Brei was accepted into medical school at the University of Nebraska Medical Center, where he became a doctor of medicine in 1984. Subsequently, he completed residency at the University of Nebraska Medical Center in 1987 and a fellowship in developmental pediatrics at Cincinnati Children's Hospital Medical Center in 1989.

== Medical career and advocacy ==
Brei spent 24 years at the Indiana University School of Medicine, where he was an associate professor of clinical pediatrics. In 2013, Brei joined the developmental pediatrics team at Seattle Children's Hospital as a professor of neurodevelopmental pediatrics. Simultaneously, he also serves as a medical director for the Spina Bifida Association of America. Brei has received numerous awards, including being named to the Best Doctors in America list multiple times. In his honor, the Spina Bifida Association of America has established the Timothy Brei, MD, Outstanding Healthcare Professional Award.

Brei's research is focused on clinical outcomes for children with spina bifida. He has also served as guest editor for the Journal of Pediatric Rehabilitation Medicine (JPRM), participating in releasing "Guidelines for the Care of People with Spina Bifida." Brei is also a member of the AAP Council on Children with Disabilities Executive Committee.

In addition to his work in the United States, Brei has also taught Chinese doctors how to holistically treat babies with spina bifida at Suzhou Children's Hospital.

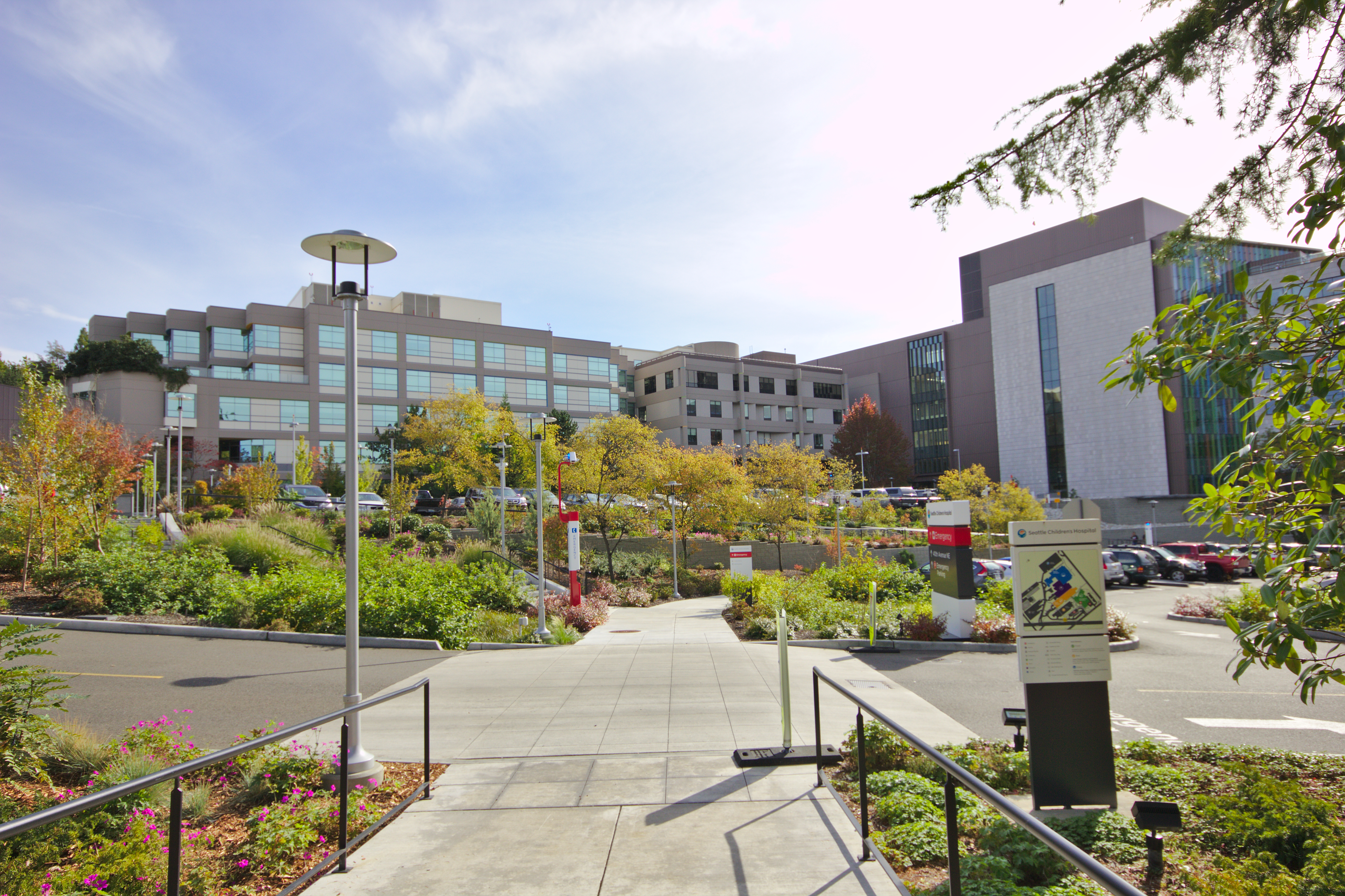
Seattle Children's Hospital, where Brei is a professor of Neurodevelopmental Pediatrics

Brei has also been quoted for his expertise many times in the media, including in US News.

== Selected publications ==
- Brei, Timothy J.; Walker, William O. (2018-09-01). "Perspectives on Surgical Care and Outcomes in Spina Bifida". Pediatrics. 142 (3). doi:10.1542/peds.2018-1985. ISSN 0031-4005. PMID 30158198.
- Sawin, Kathleen J.; Brei, Timothy J. (2012). "Health risk behaviors in spina bifida: the need for clinical and policy action". Developmental Medicine & Child Neurology. 54 (11): 974–975. doi:10.1111/j.1469-8749.2012.04415.x. ISSN 1469-8749.
- Fletcher, Jack M.; Brei, Timothy J. (2010). "Introduction: Spina bifida—A multidisciplinary perspective". Developmental Disabilities Research Reviews. 16 (1): 1–5. doi:10.1002/ddrr.101. ISSN 1940-5529. PMC 3046545. PMID 20419765.
- Sawin, Kathleen J.; Brei, Timothy J.; Buran, Constance F.; Fastenau, Philip S. (2002-09-01). "Factors Associated with Quality of Life in Adolescents with Spina Bifida". Journal of Holistic Nursing. 20 (3): 279–304. doi:10.1177/089801010202000307. ISSN 0898-0101.

== Awards ==
Year	Award	Institution	Ref
2016	Living our Legacy Award	Arc of King County	
2015	Top Doctor	Seattle Magazine	
2012	Irving Rosenbaum Community in Pediatrics Recognition Award	Indian Chapter, American Academy of Pediatrics	
2011-2012	Best Doctors in America		
2010-2011	Best Doctors in America		
2010	Chair's Excellence Award	Spina Bifida Association	
2010	International Federation (IF) for Spina Bifida and Hydrocephalus Award	International Foundation (IF) for Spina Bifida and Hydrocephalus	
2007	Membership	Society for Pediatric Research	
2005	Chair's Excellence Award	Spina Bifida Association	
2005	Extended Service Award	Spina Bifida Association	
2002	Edwin L. Gresham Recognition Award for Advancing the Care of Newborn Infants	Indiana Chapter, American Academy of Pediatrics	
