= Colored Female Religious and Moral Society =

African American women's club in Salem

The Colored Female Religious and Moral Society was an African American women's club organized in 1818 in Salem, Massachusetts. The group was started by forty women and they created their own constitution. The group's constitution was published in the Liberator, an abolitionist paper. The members promised that they would "be charitably watchful over each other." Members also were required to take an oath of secrecy. The organization was religious in nature, but they also worked to get sickness and death benefits for others. In 1833, after membership had dwindled, the society was again revived. Many of the members were "Christian propertied elite."
