= Benjamin Danielson =

American pediatrician

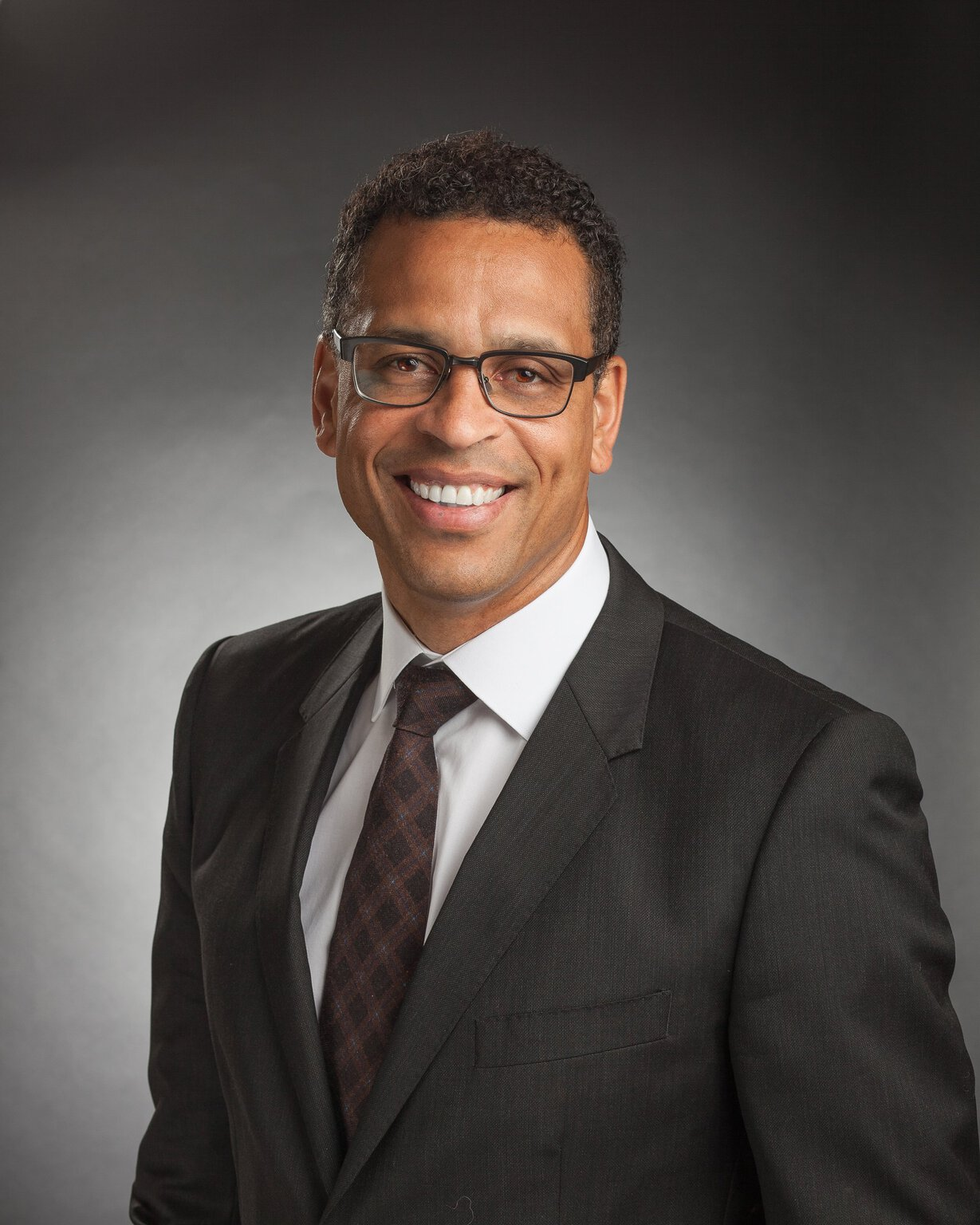
- Danielson in 2018
- Education: Harvard University (BA/BS Ethology, 1986) University of Washington School of Medicine (MD, 1992) Seattle Children's Hospital (Residency, Pediatrics)
- Occupations: Pediatrician and Clinical Professor at the University of Washington School of Medicine

Benjamin Danielson is a pediatrician and clinical Professor of Pediatrics at the University of Washington School of Medicine. Throughout his time as a pediatrician, Danielson has facilitated the creation and development of diversity programs and contributed actively to governmental policy as a member of several health boards. Danielson was the medical director of the Odessa Brown Children's Clinic from 1999 to 2020, where he then resigned and spoke out about prevalent institutional racism and a resistance to change from hospital leaders. In September 2021, it was announced that Danielson would be directing a new program, Allies in Healthier Systems for Health & Abundance in Youth (AHSHAY) to help address and prevent youth incarceration.

== Early life and education ==
Benjamin Danielson was born in Boston, Massachusetts and lived in foster care before being adopted by his single mother. Danielson and his mother, along with two siblings, then moved to Washington D.C. in his early elementary school years. When Danielson was fourteen years of age, his mother made the decision to move to Hamilton, Montana, where he graduated from high school.

Danielson graduated from Harvard University with a Bachelor of Arts and a Bachelor of Science in ethology before continuing his education at the University of Washington School of Medicine and graduating with his Doctor of Medicine (MD) in 1992. After finishing medical school, Danielson went on to complete his internship and residency at Seattle Children's hospital, formerly known as Children's Hospital and Regional Medical Center. Citing his experience and involvement in Big Brothers Big Sisters growing up, Danielson chose to pursue a career in pediatrics. Danielson received his Board Certification in Pediatrics in 1997 from the American Board of Pediatrics.

== Career and health equity advocacy ==
Shortly after completing his residency, Danielson became the medical director of the Odessa Brown Children's Clinic in 1999, a medical clinic devoted to providing access to care to underserved patients and located in the Central District of Seattle. The clinic was founded in 1970 in honor of Odessa Brown, a woman who experienced barriers to healthcare first-hand and fought to bring healthcare with dignity to the Central District. The Odessa Brown Children's Clinic has grown into a medical facility capable of providing medical care, dental care, nutrition services, and mental health services whose main mission is to provide pediatric care, mentoring, and health education to empower underserved families.

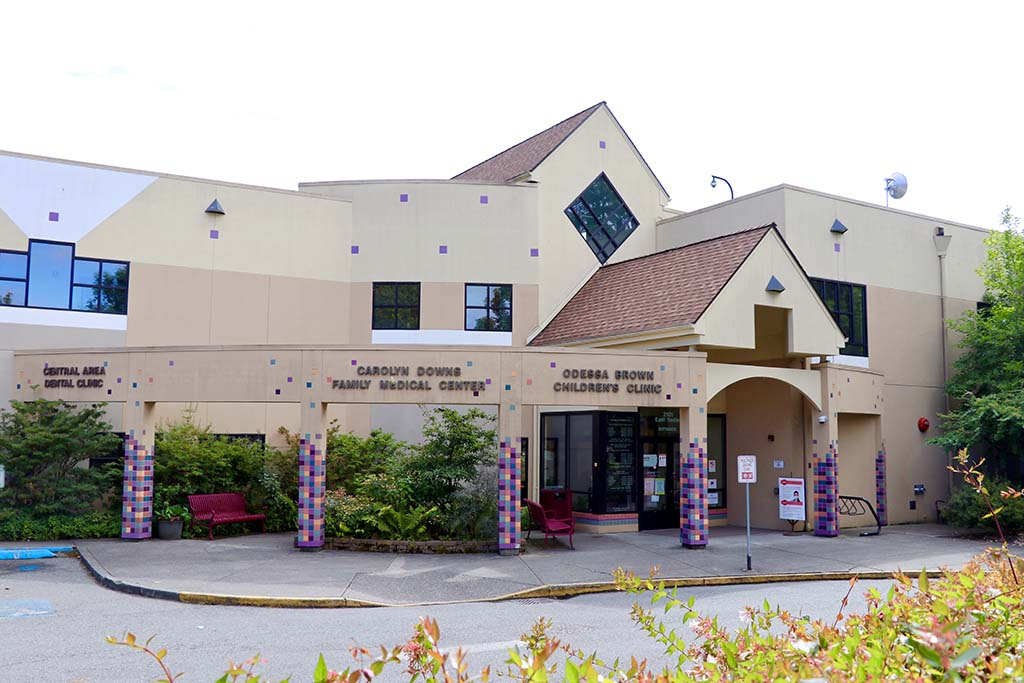
Odessa Brown Children's Clinic, a sub-clinic of Seattle Children's hospital system. Benjamin Danielson served as senior medical director of the clinic from 1999 to 2020.

As medical director of the Odessa Brown Children's Clinic, Danielson focused on providing care that suited not only the health needs of the child, but also the child as a whole. Citing increasingly alarming issues such as gentrification in Seattle, Danielson routinely advocated for helping families bridge socioeconomic barriers that often correlate with lack of access to healthcare and increased health concerns. In 2008, Danielson founded the Washington Medical-Legal Partnership, a program dedicated to teaching doctors how to notice when outside factors may be affecting the health of a child. Through the medical-legal partnership, Danielson helped connect families to pro bono attorneys that could help patients deal with issues such as insurance problems and unsuitable living conditions. Danielson felt strongly that proper medical care includes prevention before illness ever manifests itself, and educated his community about how issues such as persistent hunger can relate to unusually high cases of diabetes, asthma, high blood pressure, and obesity.

== Resignation from Seattle Children's ==
In November 2020, Danielson resigned from Seattle Children's Hospital in protest of institutional racism. Prior to his resignation, Danielson served as senior medical director of the Odessa Brown Children's Clinic, a medical facility devoted to providing underserved communities with healthcare access. In his communications with media following his resignation, Danielson spoke out about how the hospital repeatedly called security on patients of color, failed to provide translation services for patients, and that hospital administrative staff used racist terminology. Earlier in the summer of 2020, a colleague, who is a person of color, was fired without explanation; in the same time period, another colleague felt pushed into resigning. In addition, Danielson reported that his clinic, the Odessa Brown Children's Clinic, had not been properly supported by the larger Seattle Children's system during the COVID-19 pandemic. Danielson is a firm believer in collective liberation. Ultimately, Danielson's self-proclaimed decision to leave his position stemmed from his lack of faith in Seattle Children's to properly care for people of color.

Following Danielson's resignation and resultant media coverage, Seattle Children's has announced that they intend to create a new committee that will examine the hospital's current stance on issues such as diversity, inclusion, racism, and equity. The committee will be composed of members of the community and members of the Seattle Children's board of trustees.

Currently, Danielson now works at the University of Washington School of Medicine, where he is a practicing pediatrician and clinical Professor of Pediatrics. Looking forward, Danielson is working on a new program that is aimed at expanding access to healthcare and increasing health equity.

== Awards and recognition ==
Year	Award Title	Institution
2018	University of Washington Keynote Commencement Speaker	University of Washington
2018	University of Washington Medicine Distinguished Alumni Award	University of Washington Medicine
2018	Citizen of the Year	Seattle Municipal League
2017	Whole Child Award	Simms/Mann Institute
2016	Norm Maleng Advocate for Youth Award	Center for Children and Youth Justice
2014	Community Partner Award	Wellspring Family Services

== Selected publications ==
- Neff, J. M., Clifton, H., Park, K. J., Goldenberg, C., Popalisky, J., Stout, J. W., & Danielson, B. S. (2010). Identifying children with lifelong chronic conditions for care coordination by using hospital discharge data. Academic pediatrics, 10(6), 417–423. https://doi.org/10.1016/j.acap.2010.08.009
