= Houston Heights Woman's Club =

- U.S. National Register of Historic Places
- Recorded Texas Historic Landmark
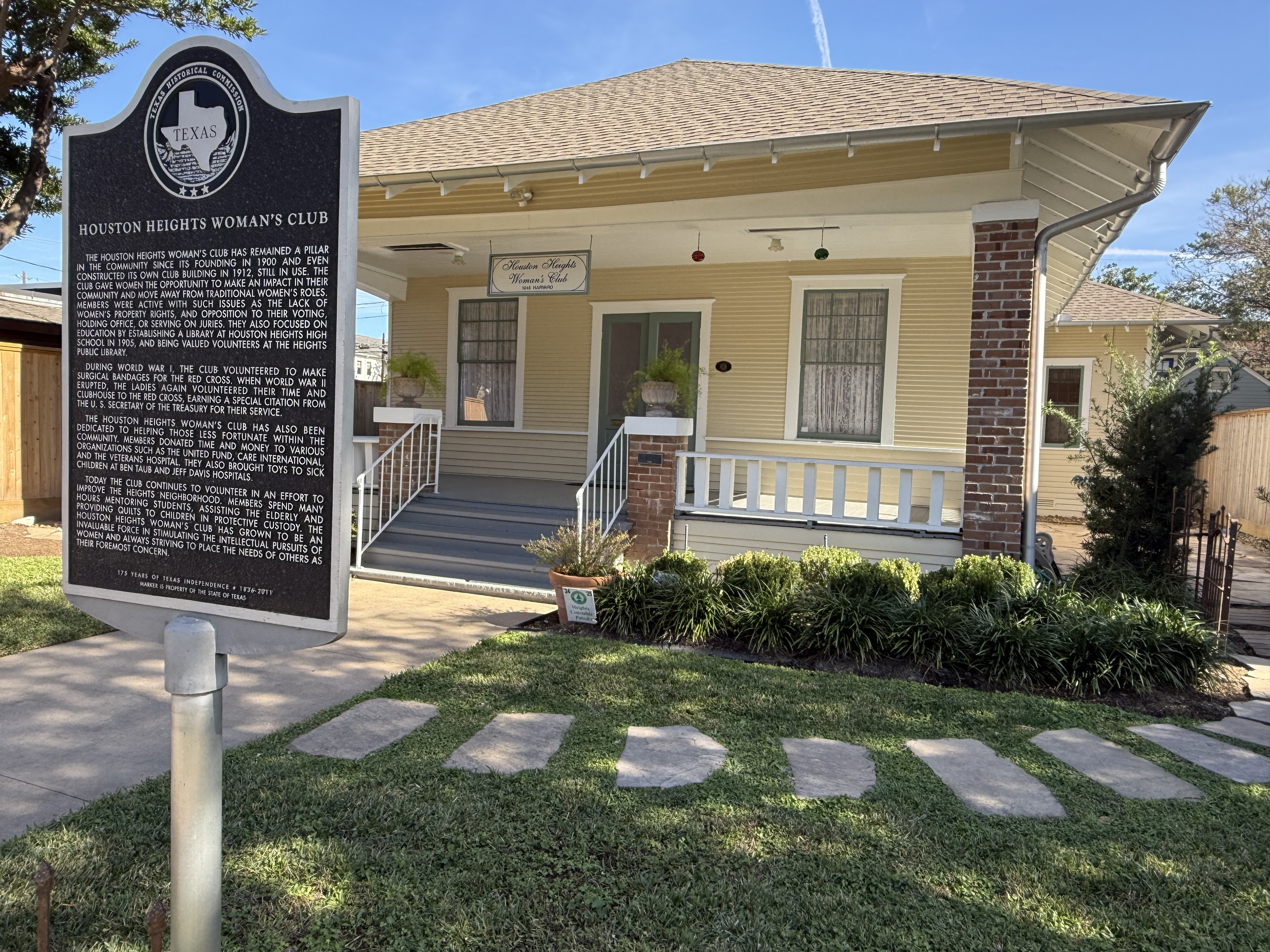
- The building's exterior in 2026

- Location within Texas Location within the United States
- Location: 1846 Harvard St., Houston, Texas
- Coordinates: 29°48′13″N 95°23′47″W
- Website: houstonheightswomansclub.com
- MPS: Houston Heights MRA
- NRHP reference No.: 83004463
- RTHL No.: 16745

Significant dates
- Added to NRHP: June 22, 1983
- Designated RTHL: 2011

The Houston Heights Woman's Club is a club located in the neighborhood of Houston Heights in Houston, Texas. It was founded in 1900 to support literary and scientific undertakings, the maintenance of a library, and the promotion of painting, music, and other fine arts. According to the club's Constitution and By-Laws, which the club's founding members adopted in 1905, an important part of the club's purpose is to "aid and encourage charitable and educational interests of Houston Heights" as an important part of the club's purpose.

Originally founded as a daytime group, the Houston Heights Woman's Club remains active after more than 125 years. Generations of these dedicated, community-oriented women have contributed to the history of the Heights and greater Houston since 1900, and served at the forefront of Women's issues since. They gather regularly for meetings and programs, and enjoy various other activities throughout the year, including community outreach volunteer projects, charitable fundraisers, outings, and social events.

In 2007, the Houston Heights Women's Club-Evening Group was founded.

In 2025, both daytime and evening Groups unified as one Club.

== History ==
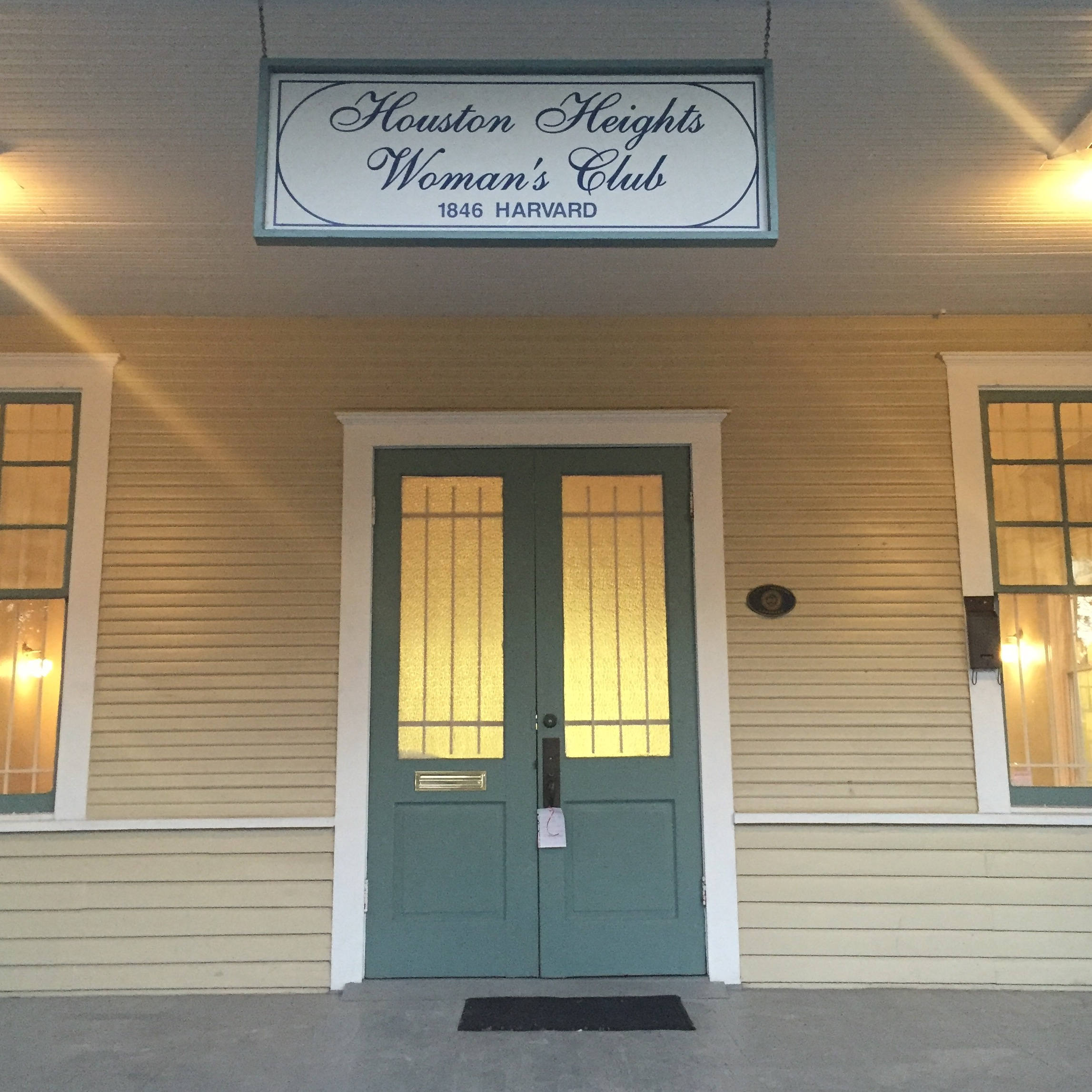
Signage above the door

The Houston Heights Woman's Club (HHWC) is a registered 501(c)(3) nonprofit organization established to preserve the historical integrity of the club and its clubhouse, and provide social and charitable opportunities for its members.

The Houston Heights Woman's Club was founded in 1900, part of the larger women's club movement across the country. What began as the Houston Heights Literary Club soon outgrew the parlors of its members. In 1912, the Clubhouse at 1846 Harvard became the official home of the Houston Heights Woman's Club. This club would become part of the very fabric of the Heights neighborhood. Through volunteerism and social activities, generations of members have kept the legacy of the HHWC alive.

President	Year
Mrs. D.D. Cooley	1911–12
Mrs. W.A. Renn	1912–14
Miss Ella McKinney	1914–15
Mrs. A.B. Sealdon	1915–18
Mrs. J.S. Purdy	1918–20
Mrs. B.F. Coop	1920–22
Mrs. C.A. McKinney	1924–26
Mrs. John Rose	1926–28
Mrs. O.F. Gordon	1928–30
Mrs. W.J. Roland	1930–32
Mrs. W.B. Welling	1932–35
Mrs. H.L. Phillips	1935–37
Mrs. T.B. Reed	1937–39
Mrs. C.H. Wilson	1939–41
Mrs. Frank Clappart	1941–43

== Club Collect ==
By Mary Stewart, 1904*

Keep us, O God, from pettiness; Let us be large in thought, in word, and in deed. Let us be done with fault finding And leave off self-seeking. May we put away all pretenses and meet each other face to face To face, without self-pity and without prejudice. May we never be hasty in judgment And always be generous. Let us take time for all things; Teach us to put into action our better impulses, Straightforward and unafraid. Grant that we may realize that it is the little things that Create differences, That in the big things of life we are as one. And, may we strive to touch and to know the great, Common woman's heart of us all, And, O Lord God, let us not forget to be kind.

- Written in 1904 by Mary Stewart, then a school principal. Mary said of her poem, "It was written as a prayer for the day. I called a 'Collect For Club Women' because I felt that women working together with wide interests for large ends was a new thing under the sun, and that perhaps they had a need for special petition and mediation of their own." Like many women's organizations across the country, we believe so strongly in Mary's message that we recite her poem at the start of every meeting.

== Membership ==
Membership information is available via the club's website.

== Achievements ==
Achievement	Year	Description
Creation of the Houston Heights High School Library	1905	The HHWC helped to raise funds and build the new library for the community.
Work with the Red Cross	World War I	The HHWC worked with the Red Cross to assist the war effort during World War I by taking in soldiers and creating bandages to send to the troops.
Donation to the Houston Public Library on Heights Boulevard	1926	The women of the Club raised money and books for the new library that had opened in the Heights neighborhood.
Assistance in the creation of the Houston Public Library outdoor reading area	1939	The women of the Club assisted the new library in building an outdoor reading patio.
Assistance to the Red Cross	World War II (1943–1944)	A large group of 2,669 people (members and community volunteers) worked tirelessly to provide 1,176,699 surgical bandages to the wounded soldiers during the second World War II.
Supported Reagan High School Prom	2012 to 2017	The HHWC helped provide Reagan High School students in need an opportunity to join their classmates in attending their senior prom by collecting and giving out dresses, tuxedos, accessories, and more.
Star of Hope toiletry bags	2015-2017	A sewing project creating personalized toiletry bags, then filled with personal hygiene items donated by members and friends of the club. All the toiletry bags created by the women of the Club go to impoverished women and the Houston Star of Hope Organization.
Created the Women's Studies Library Initiative	2015-2023	The campaign involved an annual collaboration with multiple public school libraries throughout the Heights and included a collection of books on women's studies.
Hortense Ward Scholarship	2007 to Present	Established in 2007, the Hortense Ward Scholarship is presented annually by the Houston Heights Woman's Club to a second- or third-year law school student. The recipient should exemplify the qualities of public service and commitment to social causes, especially those involving women. The scholarship is self-funded by the Club through the generosity of the members and friends of the Club.
Annual School Uniform Drive	2015 to Present	Since 2015, Club members have provided uniforms to local area public school students through our annual School Uniform Drive which ensures students at area HISD Elementary and Middle Schools have the clothing they need to be successful in the classroom by donating gently used school uniforms and funds to purchase dress code compliant clothing.
Annual Holiday Wish List	2015 to Present	Through a long-standing partnership with the Communities in Schools® program, year-round support is provided to at-risk students in area public schools. Our initiatives are designed to lift morale and provide a little extra joy throughout the school year, including fulfilling holiday wish list items for students who might otherwise go without, ensuring they have a memorable holiday season.

== See also ==
- National Register of Historic Places listings in Harris County, Texas
