= Anna Herr Clise =

American Hospital founder (1866–1936)

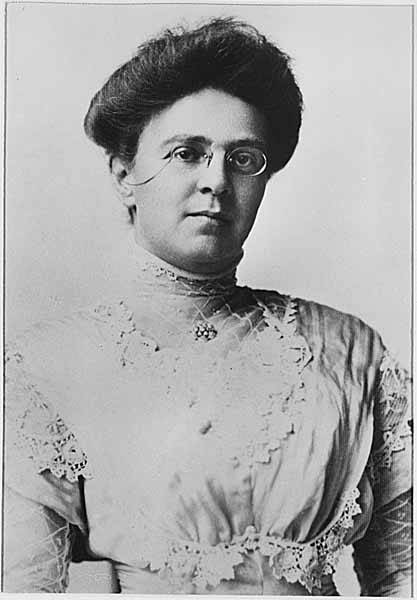
- Anna Herr Clise, circa 1907
- Born: March 9, 1866; Pennsylvania, US
- Died: February 11, 1936 (aged 69); Los Angeles County, California, US
- Known for: Founding the Children's Orthopedic Hospital in Seattle

Anna Herr Clise (March 9, 1866 – February 11, 1936) was the founder of the Children's Orthopedic Hospital, now known as Seattle Children's Hospital, in Seattle, Washington.

== Biography ==
Anna Herr was born in Pennsylvania on March 9, 1866. She married James W. Clise. James' sister urged Anna and James to relocate to Seattle, and so they did on June 7, 1889.

James and Anna lived together on a farm in Redmond, which later became known as Marymoor Park. One of their children, named Willis, became seriously ill when he was 6 years old. He died on March 19, 1898, from untreatable inflammatory rheumatism. Anna wanted to prevent other families from experiencing similar tragedies, so she thought of establishing a hospital.

On January 4, 1907, Anna gathered 16 of her friends to discuss the lack of treatment options for children in local hospitals. They decided that all children should receive care regardless of the family's ability to pay. They all agreed that support for the hospital will have to come from the community. So Anna called 23 of her friends to create a facility to treat crippled and malnourished children. Each of them contributed $20 to launch the hospital. On January 11, 1907, Anna incorporated the Children's Orthopedic Hospital Association. The hospital initially shared space with an adult hospital.

This institution became the first pediatric facility in the Northwest and the third on the west coast. Anna needed to raise money to move out of the shared space and build the first children's-only facility on Queen Anne Hill in Seattle. She did this in 1908 by raising $50,000 (worth more than $1 million in today's money), which also helped her rent seven beds for about $7 each per week. The rental fee covered bedding, meals, nursing care and operating room charges. This facility remained in Queen Anne until 1953, when it moved to its current location in Seattle's Laurelhurst neighborhood. Anna was not alive to witness that, as she died on February 11, 1936, in Los Angeles, California.
