= Seattle Children's =

Coordinates: 47°39′46″N 122°16′54″W

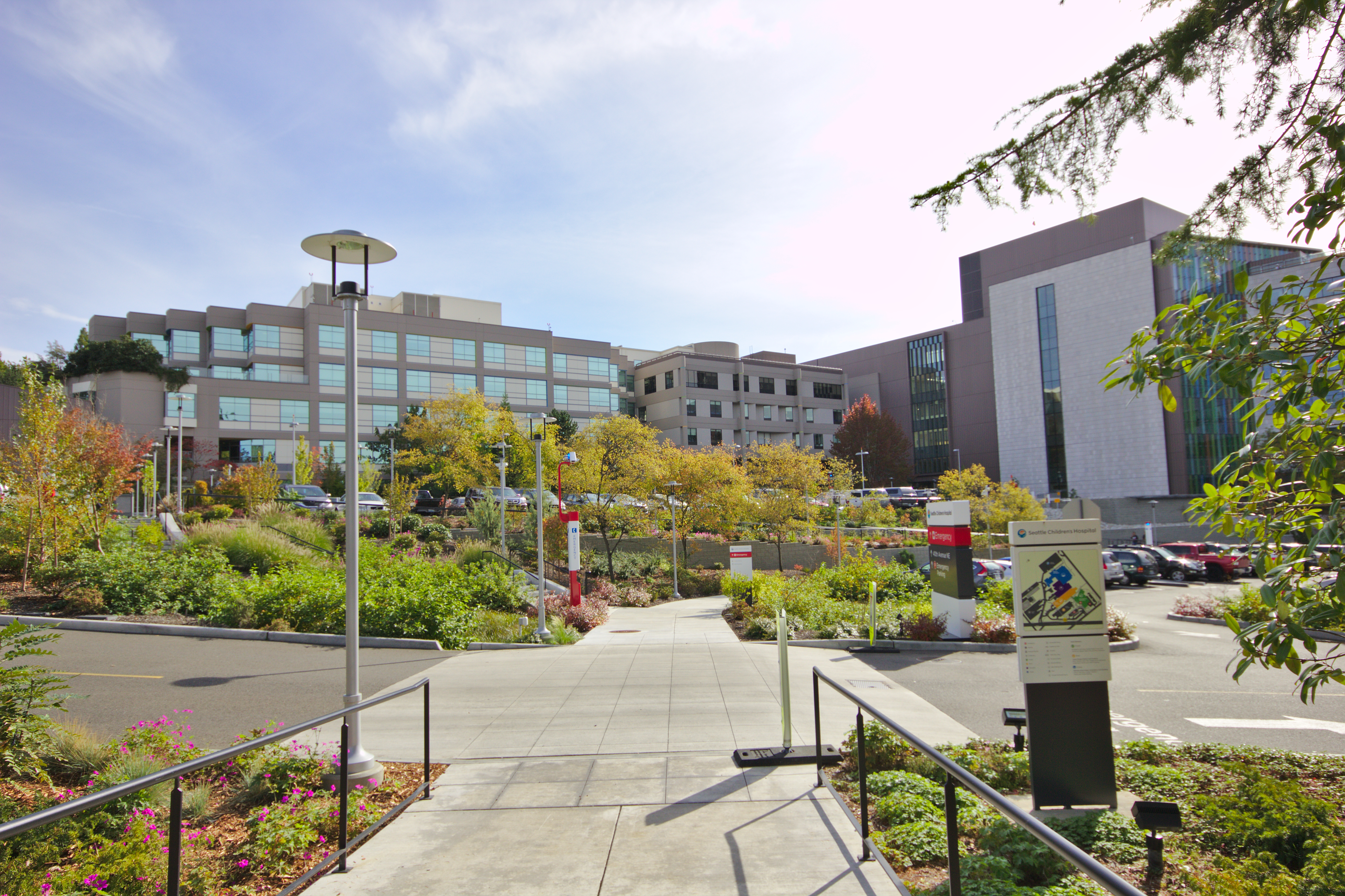

Geography
- Location: Laurelhurst, Seattle, Washington, United States

Organization
- Care system: Private
- Type: Specialist
- Affiliated university: University of Washington School of Medicine

Services
- Emergency department: Yes
- Beds: 407
- Speciality: Pediatric hospital

Helipads
- Helipad: FAA LID: 0WA8

History
- Founded: 1907

Links
- Website: seattlechildrens.org
- Lists: Hospitals in Washington state

Seattle Children's (previously Children's Hospital and Regional Medical Center; previously Children's Orthopedic Hospital) is a children's hospital in the Laurelhurst neighborhood of Seattle, Washington, United States. The hospital specializes in the care of infants, children, teens, and young adults ranging from the ages of 0–21 in several specialties.

== History ==
The hospital was founded as the seven-bed Children's Orthopedic Hospital in 1907 by Anna Herr Clise after her 5-year-old son, Willis, died of inflammatory rheumatism in 1898. It was originally a ward of the downtown Seattle General Hospital. It moved to a cottage on Queen Anne Hill the next year, and in 1911 influential community members including Herbert Gowen and Mark A. Matthews dedicated a full 40-bed hospital at the same location.

The library at the hospital was founded in 1946.

In 1953, Children's moved to a new campus in Laurelhurst, east of the University of Washington (See 1951-1953: A New Campaign).

A research division, Seattle Children's Research Institute (SCRI), was established in 2006.

In December 2007, Seattle Children's purchased a seven-story building in the Denny Triangle, near downtown Seattle and South Lake Union. With this purchase, Children's acquired nearly 2 square blocks for the research institute.

In 2008, the institution formally changed its name to Seattle Children's. In 2008, the hospital was awarded Magnet recognition by the American Nurses Credentialing Center (ANCC) and was recognized again in 2013. Also the same year, the SCRI received a $1M donation from the Bill and Melinda Gates Foundation (BMGF).

In 2010, Seattle Children's opened a clinic in Bellevue, Washington.

In 2011, Seattle Children's began charging an added facility charge for hospital-based clinic visits, including urgent care.

In 2013, Seattle Children's opened a 330,000 square foot expansion at the main campus in Seattle. The expansion included a new cancer and critical care unit as well as a new emergency department with 38 exam rooms. The facility added 80 new private beds in single patient rooms. The building is expected to use 47 percent less energy and 30 percent less water than similar-sized hospitals in the region.

In 2013 Seattle Children's filed a lawsuit against the Washington State Insurance commissioner for certifying insurance plans in the state's new health insurance exchange (established under the Affordable Care Act) for failing to provide coverage for the hospital; the hospital also filed an administrative appeal with the insurance commissioner's office. The hospital dropped the suit and appeal in 2014 when several insurance plans covered it.

In 2014, Seattle Children's received the largest donation in its history: $73.9M from Jack R. MacDonald. The same year, its Research Institute received a $3M donation from the BMGF for an Infant Breathing Support Invention.

In 2017 the hospital had a total of 403 beds.

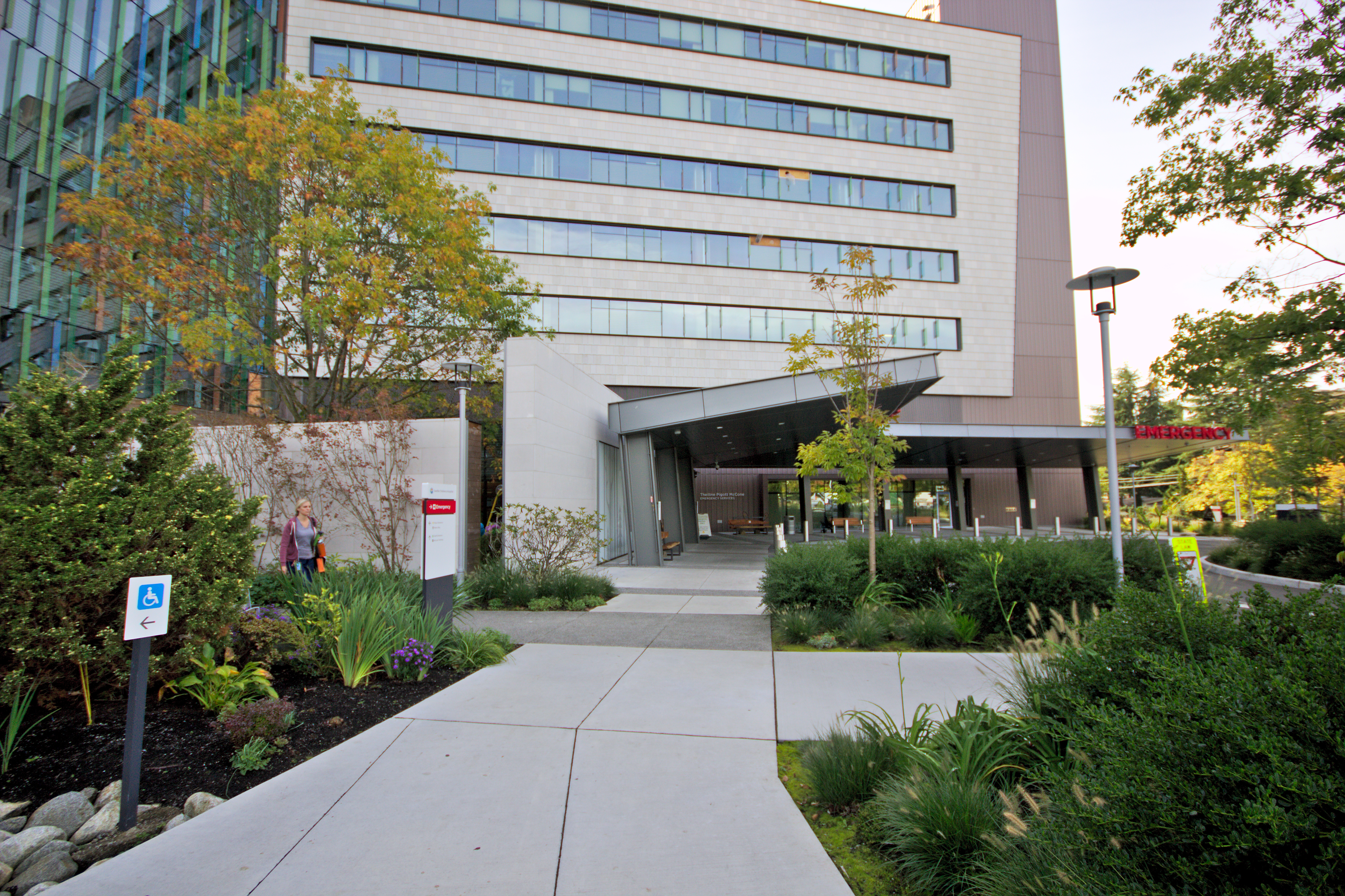
ER entrance to Seattle Children's

In 2018, the hospital broke ground on a new 310,000-square-foot addition to the hospital. The new nine floor addition features eight new operating rooms, two cardiac catheterization labs, 20 inpatient rooms, a new outpatient clinical space for the oncology and hematology center and an outpatient infusion center. The new addition will cost around $400 million and open up in 2022.

In 2019, the Seattle Center for Infectious Disease Research was absorbed by the SCRI.

In November 2020, Seattle Children's launched Seattle Children's Therapeutics, a nonprofit therapeutics development enterprise devoted to envisioning next-generation therapies for pediatric diseases. Dwayne "The Rock" Johnson also collaborated with Microsoft and billionaire Bill Gates to donate Xbox Series X consoles to the Seattle Children's along with 19 other children's hospitals throughout the country.

== Controversies ==
In 2015 the hospital warned the public that due to its improper sterilization of surgical equipment, around 12,000 children and young adults treated there since 2010 were at risk of infection from bacteria or blood-borne viruses, including hepatitis B and C and HIV; it had issued a similar warning two years earlier.

From 2001 on, it was revealed that a strain of deadly mold in the air handling systems of operating rooms (Aspergillus) was detected by hospital administrators. The mold caused 14 infections and 6 deaths. In 2018 the mold was revealed and hospital staff agreed to clean up the mold. HEPA filters were installed and operating rooms were reopened in July that year. In November 2019, mold allegations again resurfaced when an infant tested positive for a mold infection. In early 2020, the health inspectors from the State of Washington came in and questioned hospital authorities on why HEPA filters were not installed in the ORs. The mold has led to a lawsuit.

The move follows a pledge that the hospital would undertake a "rigorous" review following the departure of Dr. Ben Danielson.

In 2026, a viral social media post drew attention to the hospital's helicopter policies. While the hospital has its own helipad, many patients are forced to land at a helipad located at the University of Washington and then travel by ambulance the final one mile to the hospital. This policy is a result of Seattle Children's entering into a voluntary agreement with the Laurelhurst Community Council (LCC) and City of Seattle in 1992 where only the most serious cases would land at the hospital. Investigations have found the LCC has regularly opposed hospital expansion, placed limits on parking in the neighborhood, in addition to complaining about helicopter noise. The hospital has issued a press release on the controversy stating they are eager to revisit the agreement with the city.

=== Transgender investigations ===
In November 2023, the office of Texas Attorney General Ken Paxton issued a civil investigative demand to the hospital for any and all medical records of transgender minors being treated at the hospital, as well as the number of children originally from Texas being treated at the hospital, and guidance for how to "wean" trans patients off gender affirming medication. The demand cited Texas laws banning the care, despite the hospital being located outside of Texas. In response, the hospital filed suit.

In December 2025, the Department of Health and Human Services announced that it had launched an investigation of Seattle Children's regarding its gender-affirming care of transgender minors.

== Awards ==
In 2016, it was ranked as the 5th best children's hospital in America by U.S. News & World Report and was ranked #4 in nephrology, #6 in cancer, #5 in neonatology, #13 in gastroenterology and GI surgery, #11 in pulmonology and #9 in neurology and neurosurgery.

As of 2020 Seattle Children's has placed nationally in all 10 ranked pediatric specialties on U.S. News & World Report.

The Resident Education and Advocacy in Child Health (REACH) program, founded by Suzinne Pak-Gorstein, at Seattle Children's won the National Teaching Program Award in 2014.

U.S. News & World Report rankings for Seattle Children's
Specialty	Rank (In the U.S.)	Score (Out of 100)
Neonatology	#14	79.3
Pediatric Cancer	#11	87.9
Pediatric Cardiology & Heart Surgery	#16	74.2
Pediatric Diabetes & Endocrinology	#10	78.9
Pediatric Gastroenterology & GI Surgery	#18	81.3
Pediatric Nephrology	#8	93.2
Pediatric Neurology & Neurosurgery	#10	87.3
Pediatric Orthopedics	#17	80.0
Pediatric Pulmonology & Lung Surgery	#12	78.4
Pediatric Urology	#15	80.1
